= 2021–22 Appalachian State Mountaineers women's basketball team =

Intercollegiate basketball season

2021–22 Appalachian State Mountaineers women's basketball
- Conference: Sun Belt Conference
- Record: 14–12 (8–4 Sun Belt)
- Head coach: Angel Elderkin (8th season)
- Assistant coaches: Mark Cascio; Jazz Weaver; Alex Frazier
- Home arena: Holmes Center

2021–22 Sun Belt Conference women's basketball standings
	Conf.				Overall
Team	W		L	PCT	W		L	PCT
Troy	13	–	2	.867	24	–	9	.727
UT Arlington †	11	–	4	.733	20	–	8	.714
Louisiana	9	–	4	.692	18	–	7	.720
Appalachian State	8	–	4	.667	14	–	12	.538
Little Rock	8	–	4	.667	17	–	10	.630
Texas State	9	–	6	.600	15	–	14	.517
Georgia Southern	8	–	6	.571	18	–	10	.643
Arkansas State	5	–	9	.357	12	–	16	.429
Coastal Carolina	4	–	9	.308	15	–	11	.577
Georgia State	4	–	9	.308	10	–	16	.385
South Alabama	2	–	10	.167	8	–	18	.308
Louisiana–Monroe	0	–	14	.000	4	–	25	.138
† 2022 Sun Belt tournament winner

The 2021–22 Appalachian State Mountaineers women's basketball team represented Appalachian State University during the 2021–22 NCAA Division I women's basketball season. The basketball team, were led by eighth-year head coach Angel Elderkin, and played all home games at the Holmes Center along with the Appalachian State Mountaineers men's basketball team. They were members of the Sun Belt Conference.

== Roster ==
2021–22 Appalachian State Mountaineers women's basketball team
Players
Coaches

Pos.	#	Name	Height	Year	Previous school	Hometown
G	0	Alexis Black	5 ft 9 in (1.75 m)	Sr	Gill St. Bernard's	Basking Ridge, New Jersey
G	1	Mariah Frazier	6 ft 0 in (1.83 m)	Fr	Dudley HS	Whitsett, North Carolina
F	2	A'Lea Gilbert	6 ft 0 in (1.83 m)	RS So	South Mecklenburg HS	Charlotte, North Carolina
G	3	Taylor Lewis	5 ft 10 in (1.78 m)	Jr	Spring Valley HS	Columbia, South Carolina
G	4	Dane Bertolina	5 ft 10 in (1.78 m)	Sr	Charlotte Catholic HS	Charlotte, North Carolina
G	10	Michaela Porter	6 ft 0 in (1.83 m)	Sr	Obama Academy	Pittsburgh, Pennsylvania
G	11	Faith Alston	5 ft 7 in (1.7 m)	So	Paul VI Catholic HS	Centerville, Virginia
G	12	Zada Porter	5 ft 9 in (1.75 m)	Fr	Cave Spring HS	Roanoke, Virginia
G	13	Emily Carter	5 ft 10 in (1.78 m)	Fr	Enka HS	Asheville, North Carolina
F	15	Emma Newton	5 ft 9 in (1.75 m)	RS Jr	Asheville Christian	Asheville, North Carolina
G	20	Brooke Bigott	5 ft 10 in (1.78 m)	Sr	Seven Lakes HS	Katy, Texas
F	22	Summer Schloss	6 ft 1 in (1.85 m)	RS Fr	Ashbrook HS	Gastonia, North Carolina
G	23	Breanna Locke	6 ft 0 in (1.83 m)	Sr	Flowery Branch HS	Flowery Branch, Georgia
G	24	Janay Sanders	5 ft 11 in (1.8 m)	RS Jr	Mallard Creek HS	Charlotte, North Carolina
F	40	Adair Garrison	6 ft 1 in (1.85 m)	Fr	Freedom HS	Morgantown, North Carolina

Head coach

- Angel Elderkin (Southern Maine)

Assistant coach(es)

- Mark Cascio
- Jazz Weaver (UNC Greensboro)
- Alex Frazier (East Carolina)

Legend

- (C) Team captain
- (S) Suspended
- (I) Ineligible
- (W) Walk-on
- Injured
- Current redshirt

Roster
Last update: 19 December 2022

== Schedule and results ==
Date time, TV	Rank^{#}	Opponent^{#}	Result	Record	High points	High rebounds	High assists	Site city, state
Non-conference Regular Season
11/09/2021*; 5:00 p.m., ESPN+		Lees–McRae	W 75–41	1–0	14 – M. Porter	9 – M. Porter	5 – Alston	Holmes Center (232); Boone, NC
11/11/2021*; 7:00 p.m., ESPN+		at Mercer	L 57–61	1–1	22 – Sanders	11 – Carver	3 – M. Porter	Hawkins Arena; Macon, GA
11/14/2021*; 2:00 p.m., ESPN+		North Carolina Central	W 80–66	2–1	21 – M. Porter	10 – M. Porter	5 – Bigott	Holmes Center (394); Boone, NC
11/17/2021*; 6:00 p.m., ACCN		at North Carolina	L 44–89	2–2	7 – Alston	8 – Allesch	3 – M. Porter	Carmichael Arena (1,608); Chapel Hill, NC
11/22/2021*; 6:00 p.m., ESPN+		Winston-Salem State	W 81–49	3–2	15 – Tied	10 – Bigott	6 – Alston	Holmes Center (389); Boone, NC
11/24/2021*; 7:00 p.m., ACCN		at Duke	L 65–73	3–3	19 – Tied	6 – Tied	4 – Bigott	Cameron Indoor Stadium (2,533); Durham, NC
11/28/2021*; 2:00 p.m., ESPN+		at UNC Asheville	W 71–56	4–3	18 – Allesch	7 – Bigott	5 – Alston	Kimmel Arena (392); Asheville, NC
12/01/2021*; 5:00 p.m., ESPN+		East Tennessee State	W 81–53	5–3	17 – M. Porter	10 – Allesch	3 – Tied	Holmes Center (297); Boone, NC
12/05/2021*; 2:00 p.m., ESPN+		at Gardner–Webb	W 73–63	6–3	19 – Carver	9 – Allesch	3 – Alston	Paul Porter Arena (274); Boiling Springs, NC
12/12/2021*; 2:00 p.m., ESPN+		Wofford	L 65–78	6–4	18 – M. Porter	11 – Allesch	4 – Tied	Holmes Center (215); Boone, NC
12/15/2021*; 11:00 a.m., ESPN+		at Davidson	L 48–66	6–5	22 – M. Porter	8 – M. Porter	2 – Alston	John M. Belk Arena (1,321); Davidson, NC
12/18/2021*; 2:00 p.m., ESPN+		Old Dominion	L 49–85	6–6	13 – M. Porter	11 – Gilbert	3 – Sanders	Holmes Center (204); Boone, NC
12/21/2021*; 1:00 p.m., ESPN+		Eastern Kentucky	L 84–89 ^{2OT}	6–7	23 – M. Porter	12 – Sanders	5 – Z. Porter	Holmes Center (135); Boone, NC
Conference Regular Season
12/30/2021; 8:00 p.m., ESPN+		at South Alabama	Postponed					Mitchell Center; Mobile, AL
01/01/2022; 8:00 p.m., ESPN+		at Troy	Postponed					Trojan Arena; Troy, AL
01/06/2022; 6:00 p.m., ESPN+		Georgia State	Postponed					Holmes Center; Boone, NC
01/08/2022; 2:00 p.m., ESPN+		Georgia Southern	Postponed					Holmes Center; Boone, NC
01/13/2022; 8:00 p.m., ESPN+		at Arkansas State	L 92–98	6–8 (0–1)	19 – Sanders	11 – Allesch	7 – Alston	First National Bank Arena (790); Jonesboro, AR
01/15/2022; 2:00 p.m., ESPN+		at Little Rock	W 60–49	7–8 (1–1)	14 – Alston	7 – M. Porter	3 – Sanders	Jack Stephens Center (1,823); Little Rock, AR
01/20/2022; 6:00 p.m., ESPN+		Louisiana	W 55–46	8–8 (2–1)	14 – Allesch	10 – Allesch	3 – M. Porter	Holmes Center (289); Boone, NC
01/22/2022; 2:00 p.m., ESPN+		Louisiana–Monroe	W 67–61	9–8 (3–1)	20 – Allesch	16 – Allesch	7 – Alston	Holmes Center (278); Boone, NC
01/26/2022; 12:00 p.m., ESPN+		Coastal Carolina	W 66–61	10–8 (4–1)	20 – Allesch	11 – Allesch	5 – M. Porter	Holmes Center (248); Boone, NC
01/29/2022; 4:00 p.m., ESPN+		at Coastal Carolina	W 70–68	11–8 (5–1)	18 – Tied	8 – Allesch	3 – Carver	HTC Center (554); Conway, SC
02/06/2022; 2:00 p.m., ESPN+		at UT Arlington	L 79–88	11–9 (5–2)	21 – Carver	10 – Allesch	7 – Alston	College Park Center (55); Arlington, TX
02/10/2022; 6:00 p.m., ESPN+		at Georgia Southern	L 80–82 ^{OT}	11–10 (5–3)	21 – Allesch	13 – Allesch	6 – Alston	Hanner Fieldhouse (381); Statesboro, GA
02/12/2022; 2:00 p.m., ESPN+		at Georgia State	W 84–78 ^{OT}	12–10 (6–3)	21 – M. Porter	13 – Allesch	7 – M. Porter	GSU Sports Arena (463); Atlanta, GA
02/19/2022; 2:00 p.m., ESPN+		Texas State	W 73–55	13–10 (7–3)	25 – Sanders	11 – M. Porter	3 – Sanders	Holmes Center (1,525); Boone, NC
02/24/2022; 6:00 p.m., ESPN+		Troy	L 56–89	13–11 (7–4)	16 – Alston	8 – Allesch	2 – Tied	Holmes Center (309); Boone, NC
02/26/2022; 2:00 p.m., ESPN+		South Alabama	W 72–50	14–11 (8–4)	24 – Allesch	19 – Allesch	5 – M. Porter	Holmes Center (461); Boone, NC
Sun Belt Tournament
03/04/2022; 3:00 pm, ESPN+	(4)	vs. (5) Little Rock; Quarterfinals	L 58–70	14–12	24 – Alston	9 – Allesch	3 – Alston	Pensacola Bay Center (585); Pensacola, FL
*Non-conference game. ^{#}Rankings from AP Poll. (#) Tournament seedings in parentheses. All times are in Eastern Time.

== See also ==
- 2021–22 Appalachian State Mountaineers men's basketball team
