= 2022 Sun Belt Conference women's basketball tournament =

- Classification: Division I
- Season: 2021–22
- Teams: 12
- Site: Pensacola Bay Center; Pensacola, Florida
- Champions: UT Arlington (1st title)
- Winning coach: Shereka Wright (1st title)
- MVP: Starr Jacobs (UT Arlington)
- Television: ESPN+, ESPNU

2021–22 Sun Belt Conference women's basketball standings
	Conf.				Overall
Team	W		L	PCT	W		L	PCT
Troy	13	–	2	.867	24	–	9	.727
UT Arlington †	11	–	4	.733	20	–	8	.714
Louisiana	9	–	4	.692	18	–	7	.720
Appalachian State	8	–	4	.667	14	–	12	.538
Little Rock	8	–	4	.667	17	–	10	.630
Texas State	9	–	6	.600	15	–	14	.517
Georgia Southern	8	–	6	.571	18	–	10	.643
Arkansas State	5	–	9	.357	12	–	16	.429
Coastal Carolina	4	–	9	.308	15	–	11	.577
Georgia State	4	–	9	.308	10	–	16	.385
South Alabama	2	–	10	.167	8	–	18	.308
Louisiana–Monroe	0	–	14	.000	4	–	25	.138
† 2022 Sun Belt tournament winner

The 2022 Sun Belt Conference women's basketball tournament was the postseason women's basketball tournament for Sun Belt Conference during the 2021–22 NCAA Division I women's basketball season. All tournament games were played at Pensacola Bay Center between March 2–7, 2022. The winner, UT Arlington, received the Sun Belt's automatic bid to the 2022 NCAA tournament.

== Seeds ==
All 12 conference teams qualified for the tournament. The top four teams received a bye into the quarterfinals.

Seed	School	Conference	Tiebreaker
1	Troy	13–2	
2	UT Arlington	11–4	
3	Louisiana	9–4	
4	Appalachian State	8–4	1–0 vs. Little Rock
5	Little Rock	8–4	0–1 vs. Appalachian State
6	Texas State	9–6	
7	Georgia Southern	8–6	
8	Arkansas State	5–9	
9	Coastal Carolina	4–9	2–0 vs. Georgia State
10	Georgia State	4–9	0–2 vs. Coastal Carolina
11	South Alabama	2–10	
12	Louisiana–Monroe	0–14	

== Schedule ==
Game	Time	Matchup	Score	Television
First round – Wednesday, March 2 – Pensacola Bay Center, Pensacola, FL
1	11:30 am	No. 8 Arkansas State vs. No. 9 Coastal Carolina	76-91	ESPN+
2	2:00 pm	No. 5 Little Rock vs. No. 12 Louisiana-Monroe	61-56	ESPN+
3	5:00 pm	No. 6 Texas State vs. No. 11 South Alabama	80-66	ESPN+
4	7:30 pm	No. 7 Georgia Southern vs. No. 10 Georgia State	88-79	ESPN+
Quarterfinals – Friday, March 4 – Pensacola Bay Center, Pensacola, FL
5	11:30 am	No. 1 Troy vs. No. 9 Coastal Carolina	99-77	ESPN+
6	2:00 pm	No. 4 Appalachian State vs. No. 5 Little Rock	58–70	ESPN+
7	5:00 pm	No. 3 Louisiana vs. No. 6 Texas State	71–46	ESPN+
8	7:30 pm	No. 2 UT Arlington vs. No. 7 Georgia Southern	85–76	ESPN+
Semifinals – Sunday, March 6 – Pensacola Bay Center, Pensacola, FL
9	11:30 am	No. 1 Troy vs. No. 5 Little Rock	62-59	ESPN+
10	2 pm	No. 2 UT Arlington vs. No. 3 Louisiana	75-65	ESPN+
Championship – Monday, March 7 – Pensacola Bay Center, Pensacola, FL
11	1 pm	No. 1 Troy vs. No. 2 UT Arlington	61-76	ESPNU
Game times in CT. Rankings denote tournament seed

== Bracket ==
First round Wednesday, March 2nd, 2022; ESPN+
8	Arkansas State	76
9	Coastal Carolina	91
5	Little Rock	61
12	Louisiana-Monroe	56
6	Texas State	80
11	South Alabama	66
7	Georgia Southern	88
10	Georgia State	79

Quarterfinals; Friday, March 4th, 2022; ESPN+
1	Troy	99
9	Coastal Carolina	77
4	Appalachian State	58
5	Little Rock	70
3	Louisiana	71
6	Texas State	46
2	UT Arlington	85
7	Georgia Southern	76

Semifinals; Sunday, March 6th, 2022; ESPN+
1	Troy	62
5	Little Rock	59
2	UT Arlington	75
3	Louisiana	65

Championship game Monday, March 7th, 2022; ESPN2
1	Troy	61
2	UT Arlington	76

== See also ==
2022 Sun Belt Conference men's basketball tournament
