= 2021–22 Coastal Carolina Chanticleers women's basketball team =

Intercollegiate basketball season

2021–22 Coastal Carolina Chanticleers women's basketball
- Conference: Sun Belt Conference
- Record: 15–11 (4–9 Sun Belt)
- Head coach: Jaida Williams (8th season)
- Assistant coaches: Vanessa Taylor; Nicholas Morgan; Akeem Williams
- Home arena: HTC Center

2021–22 Sun Belt Conference women's basketball standings
	Conf.				Overall
Team	W		L	PCT	W		L	PCT
Troy	13	–	2	.867	24	–	9	.727
UT Arlington †	11	–	4	.733	20	–	8	.714
Louisiana	9	–	4	.692	18	–	7	.720
Appalachian State	8	–	4	.667	14	–	12	.538
Little Rock	8	–	4	.667	17	–	10	.630
Texas State	9	–	6	.600	15	–	14	.517
Georgia Southern	8	–	6	.571	18	–	10	.643
Arkansas State	5	–	9	.357	12	–	16	.429
Coastal Carolina	4	–	9	.308	15	–	11	.577
Georgia State	4	–	9	.308	10	–	16	.385
South Alabama	2	–	10	.167	8	–	18	.308
Louisiana–Monroe	0	–	14	.000	4	–	25	.138
† 2022 Sun Belt tournament winner

The 2021–22 Coastal Carolina Chanticleers women's basketball team represented Coastal Carolina University during the 2021–22 NCAA Division I women's basketball season. The basketball team, led by eighth-year head coach Jaida Williams, played all home games at the HTC Center in Conway, South Carolina as members of the Sun Belt Conference.

They finished the season with a 15–11 record, including 4–9 in Sun Belt play, to finish in a tie for ninth place. In the Sun Belt tournament, they defeated eighth seed Arkansas State in the first round, before being eliminated by top-seeded Troy in the quarterfinals.

== Roster ==
2021–22 Coastal Carolina Chanticleers women's basketball team
Players
Coaches

Pos.	#	Name	Height	Year	Previous school	Hometown
G	0	Blayre Shultz	5 ft 7 in (1.7 m)	Jr	Morristown West HS; Walters State CC	Morristown, TN
G	1	Brali Simmons	5 ft 8 in (1.73 m)	So	St. Agnes Academy	Memphis, TN
G	2	Jordyn Newsome	5 ft 8 in (1.73 m)	Fr	MacArthur HS	Irving, TX
G	4	Arin Freeman	5 ft 7 in (1.7 m)	Fr	North Little Rock HS	Little Rock, AR
G	5	Deaja Richardson	5 ft 9 in (1.75 m)	Jr	Westridge Academy; Tennessee State	Kernersville, NC
C	10	Janeen Camp	6 ft 5 in (1.96 m)	Sr	TPLS Christian Academy; Towson	Portsmouth, VA
G	11	Angie Juste-Jean	5 ft 8 in (1.73 m)	Fr	Winston-Salem Christian	Montreal, QC
G	12	Tyra Brown	5 ft 6 in (1.68 m)	Sr	Pattonville HS; Jefferson College	St. Louis, MO
F	14	Savannah Dews	6 ft 2 in (1.88 m)	Fr	Brentwood Academy	Tucson, AZ
F	20	Janae Camp	6 ft 1 in (1.85 m)	Sr	TPLS Christian Academy	Portsmouth, VA
F	21	Aja Blount	5 ft 11 in (1.8 m)	Sr	Northampton HS; IMG Academy	Northampton, PA
G	23	Kalaya Buggs	5 ft 7 in (1.7 m)	Fr	Long Beach Polytechnic HS	Compton, CA
F	31	Arielle-Vadrelle Belinga	6 ft 0 in (1.83 m)	Fr	Sandy Creek HS	Riverdale, GA
C	32	Benie Lundu	6 ft 5 in (1.96 m)	Fr	Green Forest HS	Kinshasa, Congo

Head coach

- Jaida Williams (Cal Poly Pomona)

Assistant coach(es)

- Vanessa Taylor (Hampton)
- Nicholas Morgan (Southern Illinois)
- Akeem Williams (Dickinson State)

Legend

- (C) Team captain
- (S) Suspended
- (I) Ineligible
- (W) Walk-on
- Injured
- Current redshirt

Roster
Last update: December 22, 2022

== Schedule and results ==
Date time, TV	Rank^{#}	Opponent^{#}	Result	Record	High points	High rebounds	High assists	Site city, state
Non-conference regular season
November 9, 2021*; 5:00 p.m.		Agnes Scott	W 117–25	1–0	20 – Newsome	7 – Blount	6 – 2 tied	HTC Center (337); Conway, SC
November 13, 2021*; 7:00 p.m.		at South Carolina State	W 81–57	2–0	39 – Blount	8 – Freeman	6 – Freeman	SHM Memorial Center (243); Orangeburg, SC
November 16, 2021*; 6:00 p.m.		Erskine	W 74–24	3–0	18 – Blount	6 – 2 tied	5 – Brown	HTC Center (384); Conway, SC
November 20, 2021*; 2:00 p.m.		at UNC Wilmington	W 73–62	4–0	23 – Blount	14 – Blount	3 – Freeman	Trask Coliseum (580); Wilmington, NC
November 26, 2021*; 2:00 p.m.		UNG Greensboro; Coastal Carolina Thanksgiving Classic	W 53–41	5–0	17 – Brown	9 – 2 tied	4 – Shultz	HTC Center (213); Conway, SC
November 28, 2021*; 2:00 p.m.		East Tennessee State; Coastal Carolina Thanksgiving Classic	W 55–41	6–0	16 – Blount	17 – Blount	3 – Shultz	HTC Center (308); Conway, SC
December 4, 2021*; 4:00 p.m.		Wofford	W 58–46	7–0	10 – Jane. Camp	20 – Blount	4 – Shultz	HTC Center (424); Conway, SC
December 7, 2021*; 6:00 p.m.		Wesleyan	W 116–39	8–0	16 – Jane. Camp	9 – Jane. Camp	9 – Buggs	HTC Center (467); Conway, SC
December 15, 2021*; 11:00 a.m.		Saint Mary's	L 58–61	8–1	20 – Blount	10 – Jana. Camp	4 – Buggs	HTC Center (292); Conway, SC
December 18, 2021*; 2:00 p.m.		Florida A&M; Coastal Carolina Christmas Classic	W 76–72	9–1	21 – Blount	7 – Juste-Jean	3 – 3 tied	HTC Center (228); Conway, SC
December 19, 2021*; 4:30 p.m.		Radford; Coastal Carolina Christmas Classic	W 85–64	10–1	29 – Freeman	13 – Jana. Camp	3 – Freeman	HTC Center (302); Conway, SC
Conference regular season
December 30, 2021; 6:00 p.m.		vs. Troy	L 80–91	10–2 (0–1)	23 – Juste-Jean	10 – Juste-Jean	4 – Freeman	Humphrey Coliseum (1,049); Starkville, MS
January 1, 2022		at South Alabama	Postponed					Mitchell Center; Mobile, AL
January 6, 2022; 6:00 p.m.		Georgia Southern	W 72–69	11–2 (1–1)	25 – Juste-Jean	16 – Jane. Camp	4 – Juste-Jean	HTC Center (346); Conway, SC
January 8, 2022; 2:00 p.m.		Georgia State	W 75–51	12–2 (2–1)	22 – Shultz	17 – Blount	3 – 4 tied	HTC Center (380); Conway, SC
January 13, 2022; 6:30 p.m.		at Little Rock	L 50–54	12–3 (2–2)	17 – Blount	11 – Jane. Camp	1 – 4 tied	Jack Stephens Center (1,814); Little Rock, AR
January 15, 2022; 1:00 p.m.		at Arkansas State	L 60–81	12–4 (2–3)	23 – Blount	9 – Jana. Camp	3 – Shultz	First National Bank Arena (613); Jonesboro, AR
January 20, 2022		Louisiana–Monroe	Postponed					HTC Center; Conway, SC
January 22, 2022; ESPN+		Louisiana	Postponed					HTC Center; Conway, SC
January 26, 2022; 12:00 p.m.		at Appalachian State	L 61–66	12–5 (2–4)	20 – Blount	10 – 2 tied	3 – Shultz	Holmes Center (248); Boone, NC
January 29, 2022; 4:00 p.m.		Appalachian State	L 68–70	12–6 (2–5)	27 – Blount	11 – Blount	5 – 2 tied	HTC Center (554); Conway, SC
February 5, 2022; 2:00 p.m.		at Texas State	L 59–64	12–7 (2–6)	14 – Blount	10 – Jane. Camp	3 – 2 tied	Strahan Arena; San Marcos, TX
February 10, 2022; 6:00 p.m.		at Georgia State	W 69–62	13–7 (3–6)	19 – Freeman	8 – 2 tied	4 – Freeman	GSU Sports Arena (409); Atlanta, GA
February 12, 2022; 2:00 p.m.		at Georgia Southern	L 75–90	13–8 (3–7)	24 – Newsome	7 – 2 tied	2 – 3 tied	Hanner Fieldhouse (842); Statesboro, GA
February 19, 2022; 1:00 p.m.		UT Arlington	L 61–70	13–9 (3–8)	20 – Blount	12 – 2 tied	3 – Freeman	HTC Center (732); Conway, SC
February 24, 2022; 6:00 p.m.		South Alabama	W 79–62	14–9 (4–8)	19 – Blount	19 – Blount	4 – Blount	HTC Center (320); Conway, SC
February 26, 2022; 2:00 p.m.		Troy	L 58–71	14–10 (4–9)	20 – Blount	17 – Blount	3 – 2 tied	HTC Center (337); Conway, SC
Sun Belt tournament
March 2, 2022; 11:30 a.m., ESPN+	(9)	vs. (8) Arkansas State; First round	W 91–76	15–10	41 – Blount	13 – Jane. Camp	6 – Freeman	Pensacola Bay Center; Pensacola, FL
March 4, 2022; 11:30 a.m., ESPN+	(9)	vs. (1) Troy; Quarterfinals	L 77–99	15–11	22 – Blount	8 – Jana. Camp	4 – Brown	Pensacola Bay Center (724); Pensacola, FL
*Non-conference game. ^{#}Rankings from AP poll. (#) Tournament seedings in parentheses. All times are in Eastern.

== See also ==
- 2021–22 Coastal Carolina Chanticleers men's basketball team
