= 2021–22 Arkansas State Red Wolves women's basketball team =

Intercollegiate basketball season

2021–22 Arkansas State Red Wolves women's basketball
- Conference: Sun Belt Conference
- Record: 12–16 (5–9 Sun Belt)
- Head coach: Destinee Rogers (1st season)
- Assistant coaches: Connor McNelis; Lizzie Nessling
- Home arena: First National Bank Arena

2021–22 Sun Belt Conference women's basketball standings
	Conf.				Overall
Team	W		L	PCT	W		L	PCT
Troy	13	–	2	.867	24	–	9	.727
UT Arlington †	11	–	4	.733	20	–	8	.714
Louisiana	9	–	4	.692	18	–	7	.720
Appalachian State	8	–	4	.667	14	–	12	.538
Little Rock	8	–	4	.667	17	–	10	.630
Texas State	9	–	6	.600	15	–	14	.517
Georgia Southern	8	–	6	.571	18	–	10	.643
Arkansas State	5	–	9	.357	12	–	16	.429
Coastal Carolina	4	–	9	.308	15	–	11	.577
Georgia State	4	–	9	.308	10	–	16	.385
South Alabama	2	–	10	.167	8	–	18	.308
Louisiana–Monroe	0	–	14	.000	4	–	25	.138
† 2022 Sun Belt tournament winner

The 2021–22 Arkansas State Red Wolves women's basketball team represented Arkansas State University during the 2021–22 NCAA Division I women's basketball season. The basketball team, led by first full-year head coach Destinee Rogers, played all home games at the First National Bank Arena along with the Arkansas State Red Wolves men's basketball team. They were members of the Sun Belt Conference.

== Roster ==
2021–22 Arkansas State Red Wolves women's basketball team
Players
Coaches

Pos.	#	Name	Height	Year	Previous school	Hometown
G	0	Jade Upshaw	5 ft 7 in (1.7 m)	Fr	Kellyville HS	Sapulpa, Oklahoma
G	1	Jireh Washington	5 ft 9 in (1.75 m)	Jr	Central HS	Memphis, Tennessee
G	2	Leilani Augmon	5 ft 11 in (1.8 m)	So	Silver Creek HS; Salt Lake CC	San Jose, California
G	3	Morgan Wallace	5 ft 10 in (1.78 m)	Sr	Pulaski Academy	Little Rock, Arkansas
G	4	Mya Love	5 ft 8 in (1.73 m)	So	Nettleton HS	Jonesboro, Arkansas
G	10	Keya Patton	5 ft 7 in (1.7 m)	Jr	Cathedral HS; Wabash Valley; Auburn	Indianapolis, Indiana
G	11	Mailyn Wilkerson	5 ft 6 in (1.68 m)	Fr	Summer Creek HS; Trinity Valley CC	Houston, Texas
F	14	Jada Williams	6 ft 0 in (1.83 m)	Fr	Union City HS	Union City, Tennessee
F	23	Trinitee Jackson	6 ft 3 in (1.91 m)	Jr	Christian County HS	Dallas, Texas
G	24	Lauryn Pendleton	5 ft 9 in (1.75 m)	Fr	Little Rock Central HS	Little Rock, Arkansas
F	30	Kiayra Ellis	6 ft 0 in (1.83 m)	Fr	Captain Shreve HS	Shreveport, Louisiana

Head coach

- Destinee Rogers (Arkansas State)

Assistant coach(es)

- Connor McNelis (Southern Miss)
- Lizzie Nessling (Saint Mary)

Legend

- (C) Team captain
- (S) Suspended
- (I) Ineligible
- (W) Walk-on
- Injured
- Current redshirt

Roster
Last update: 21 December 2022

== Schedule and results ==
Date time, TV	Rank^{#}	Opponent^{#}	Result	Record	High points	High rebounds	High assists	Site city, state
Non-conference Regular Season
11/09/2021*; 11:00 a.m., ESPN+		Central Baptist	W 83–52	1–0	19 – Pendleton	8 – Love	9 – Pendleton	First National Bank Arena (1,126); Jonesboro, AR
11/12/2021*; 10:30 a.m.		at Oklahoma	L 89–101	1–1	23 – Wallace	9 – Jackson	3 – Love	Lloyd Noble Center; Norman, OK
11/15/2021*; 5:00 p.m., ESPN+		McNeese State	W 96–72	2–1	14 – Tied	8 – Jackson	7 – Upshaw	First National Bank Arena (1,413); Jonesboro, AR
11/19/2021*; 7:00 p.m., ESPN+		Arkansas	L 71–94	2–2	17 – Patton	16 – Jackson	3 – Pendleton	First National Bank Arena (2,574); Jonesboro, AR
11/22/2021*; 5:00 p.m., ESPN+		at Southeast Missouri State	W 73–65	3–2	25 – Jackson	15 – Jackson	2 – Tied	Show Me Center (478); Cape Girardeau, MO
11/23/2021*; 7:00 p.m., ESPN+		Ozarks	W 95–49	4–2	17 – Upshaw	13 – Pendleton	5 – Upshaw	First National Bank Arena (418); Jonesboro, AR
11/27/2021*; 2:00 p.m.		at Oral Roberts; ORU Thanksgiving Classic	L 62–81	4–3	12 – Wallace	7 – Wallace	3 – Patton	Mabee Center; Tulsa, OK
11/28/2021*; 11:00 a.m.		vs. Abilene Christian; ORU Thanksgiving Classic	L 69–81	4–4	16 – Jackson	12 – Jackson	3 – Wallace	Mabee Center; Tulsa, OK
12/02/2021*; 7:00 p.m., ESPN+		Northwestern State	L 76–80	4–5	20 – Jackson	14 – Jackson	6 – Wallace	First National Bank Arena (466); Jonesboro, AR
12/08/2021*; 7:00 p.m.		at Utah State	L 65–66	4–6	17 – Upshaw	10 – Wallace	4 – Tied	Smith Spectrum (348); Logan, UT
12/14/2021*; 7:00 p.m., ESPN+		Mississippi Valley State	W 81–47	5–6	13 – Tied	9 – Wallace	6 – Wallace	First National Bank Arena (339); Jonesboro, AR
12/19/2021*; 4:00 p.m., ESPN+		Hendrix	W 98–48	6–6	23 – Patton	11 – Tied	7 – Tied	First National Bank Arena (945); Jonesboro, AR
12/22/2021*; 5:30 p.m., ESPN+		at SIU Edwardsville	W 74–71	7–6	16 – Upshaw	8 – Wallace	4 – Washington	Vadalabene Center (149); Edwardsville, IL
Conference Regular Season
12/30/2021; 1:00 p.m., ESPN+		at Georgia Southern	L 75–84	7–7 (0–1)	16 – Pendleton	10 – Wallace	4 – Wilkerson	Hanner Fieldhouse (312); Statesboro, GA
01/01/2022; 1:00 p.m.		Georgia State	Postponed					First National Bank Arena; Jonesboro, AR
01/06/2022; 7:00 p.m.		Louisiana	Postponed					First National Bank Arena; Jonesboro, AR
01/08/2022; 1:00 p.m., ESPN+		Louisiana–Monroe	W 98–70	8–7 (1–1)	30 – Patton	10 – Jackson	6 – Wallace	First National Bank Arena (413); Jonesboro, AR
01/13/2022; 7:00 p.m., ESPN+		Appalachian State	W 98–92	9–7 (2–1)	25 – Washington	10 – Wallace	4 – Tied	First National Bank Arena (790); Jonesboro, AR
01/15/2022; 1:00 p.m., ESPN+		Coastal Carolina	W 81–60	10–7 (3–1)	19 – Patton	14 – Jackson	7 – Washington	First National Bank Arena (613); Jonesboro, AR
01/20/2022; 7:00 p.m., ESPN+		at South Alabama	L 65–73	10–8 (3–2)	25 – Washington	14 – Tied	3 – Wallace	Mitchell Center (275); Mobile, AL
01/22/2022; 4:00 p.m., ESPN+		at Troy	L 72–79	10–9 (3–3)	21 – Pendleton	13 – Wallace	4 – Wilkerson	Trojan Arena (1,693); Troy, AL
01/27/2022; 7:00 p.m., ESPN+		at UT Arlington	L 87–90	10–10 (3–4)	28 – Washington	11 – Wallace	10 – Wallace	First National Bank Arena (608); Jonesboro, AR
01/29/2022; 1:00 p.m., ESPN+		Texas State	L 69–75	10–11 (3–5)	18 – Jackson	21 – Jackson	6 – Tied	First National Bank Arena (515); Jonesboro, AR
02/05/2022; 2:00 p.m., ESPN+		at Louisiana	L 57–68	10–12 (3–6)	14 – Pendleton	10 – Washington	5 – Washington	Cajundome (356); Lafayette, LA
02/07/2022; 5:00 p.m., ESPN+		at Louisiana–Monroe	W 82–60	11–12 (4–6)	19 – Pendleton	10 – Jackson	5 – Tied	Fant–Ewing Coliseum (599); Monroe, LA
02/12/2022; 2:00 p.m., ESPN+		at Little Rock	L 55–64	11–13 (4–7)	13 – Tied	8 – Wallace	3 – Wallace	Jack Stephens Center (2,269); Little Rock, AR
02/19/2022; 1:00 p.m., ESPN+		Little Rock	L 69–73	11–14 (4–8)	15 – Wilkerson	8 – Wallace	3 – Tied	First National Bank Arena (639); Jonesboro, AR
02/24/2022; 7:00 p.m., ESPN+		at Texas State	L 75–84	11–15 (4–9)	25 – Washington	9 – Wallace	5 – Washington	Strahan Arena (718); San Marcos, TX
02/26/2022; 2:00 p.m., ESPN+		at UT Arlington	W 82–75	12–15 (5–9)	26 – Washington	8 – Washington	5 – Tied	College Park Center (965); Arlington, TX
Sun Belt Tournament
03/02/2022; 11:30 a.m., ESPN+	(8)	vs. (9) Coastal Carolina; First Round	L 76–91	12–16	30 – Washington	7 – Tied	2 – Tied	Pensacola Bay Center; Pensacola, FL
*Non-conference game. ^{#}Rankings from AP Poll. (#) Tournament seedings in parentheses. All times are in Central Time.

== See also ==
- 2021–22 Arkansas State Red Wolves men's basketball team
