= 2021–22 UT Arlington Mavericks women's basketball team =

Intercollegiate basketball season

2021–22 UT Arlington Mavericks women's basketball

Sun Belt Tournament Champions

NCAA tournament, first round
- Conference: Sun Belt
- Record: 20–8 (11–4 Sun Belt)
- Head coach: Shereka Wright (3rd season)
- Assistant coaches: Austin Kelly (1st season); Rosalyn Tindel (2nd season); Sean Ehlbeck (2nd season)
- Home arena: College Park Center

2021–22 Sun Belt Conference women's basketball standings
	Conf.				Overall
Team	W		L	PCT	W		L	PCT
Troy	13	–	2	.867	24	–	9	.727
UT Arlington †	11	–	4	.733	20	–	8	.714
Louisiana	9	–	4	.692	18	–	7	.720
Appalachian State	8	–	4	.667	14	–	12	.538
Little Rock	8	–	4	.667	17	–	10	.630
Texas State	9	–	6	.600	15	–	14	.517
Georgia Southern	8	–	6	.571	18	–	10	.643
Arkansas State	5	–	9	.357	12	–	16	.429
Coastal Carolina	4	–	9	.308	15	–	11	.577
Georgia State	4	–	9	.308	10	–	16	.385
South Alabama	2	–	10	.167	8	–	18	.308
Louisiana–Monroe	0	–	14	.000	4	–	25	.138
† 2022 Sun Belt tournament winner

The 2021–22 UT Arlington Mavericks women's basketball team represented University of Texas at Arlington during the 2021–22 NCAA Division I women's basketball season. The Mavericks, led by third-year head coach Shereka Wright, played their home games at the College Park Center as members of the Sun Belt Conference.

They finished the season with a 20–8 overall record, 11–4 in Sun Belt play to finish in second place. As the second seed in the Sun Belt Tournament, they earned a bye into the second round and defeated Georgia Southern, Louisiana, and Troy to win the championship. They received an automatic bid to the NCAA tournament, where they were the fourteenth seed in the Greensboro Region. They lost to third seed Iowa State in the first round to end their season.

== Previous season ==
The Mavericks finished the season with a 13–7 overall record, 11–4 in Sun Belt play to finish in second place in the West Division. As the second seed from the West in the Sun Belt Tournament, they earned a bye into the second round, where they lost to Appalachian State. They were not invited to the NCAA tournament or the WNIT.

== Roster ==
2021–22 UT Arlington Mavericks women's basketball team
Players
Coaches

Pos.	#	Name	Height	Year	Previous school	Hometown
F	0	Stephanie Mosley	6 ft 0 in (1.83 m)	Fr	Timberview	Mansfield, TX
G	1	Olympia Chaney	5 ft 8 in (1.73 m)	Fr	Forest Park	Atlanta, GA
G	2	Reniya Jones	5 ft 8 in (1.73 m)	Fr	New Hope Academy	Washington, D.C.
F	4	Starr Jacobs	6 ft 2 in (1.88 m)	RS Jr	Duncanville; Temple College	Dallas, TX
G	5	Aaliyah McMillan	6 ft 0 in (1.83 m)	Fr	Huntington Beach	Huntington Beach, CA
G	20	Claire Chastain	6 ft 0 in (1.83 m)	Sr	Dale	Shawnee, OK
G	21	Terryn Milton	5 ft 9 in (1.75 m)	Sr	Owasso High School	Owasso, OK
G	23	Camryn Hawkins	5 ft 10 in (1.78 m)	Sr	Rio Rancho	Albuquerque, NM
G	24	De'Sha Benjamin	6 ft 0 in (1.83 m)	Sr	Laney; Alabama	Augusta, GA
F	32	Jordyn Turner	6 ft 2 in (1.88 m)	Fr	Casady School	Oklahoma City, OK
F	34	Shyia Smith	5 ft 11 in (1.8 m)	Sr	Idabel; Wichita State	Idable, OK
G	41	Katie Ferrell	6 ft 1 in (1.85 m)	Sr	Plano	Plano, TX
F	45	Emma Halverson	6 ft 3 in (1.91 m)	Sr	Plano	Plano, TX

Head coach

- Shereka Wright (Purdue)

Assistant coach(es)

- Austin Kelly (Duke)
- Rosalyn Tindel (Midwestern State)
- Sean Ehlbeck (Maryland)

Legend

- (C) Team captain
- (S) Suspended
- (I) Ineligible
- (W) Walk-on
- Injured
- Current redshirt

Roster
Last update: May 16, 2022

== Schedule ==
Date time, TV	Rank^{#}	Opponent^{#}	Result	Record	High points	High rebounds	High assists	Site (attendance) city, state
Non-conference regular season
November 11, 2021*; 7:00 p.m., ESPN+		No. 7 Baylor	L 54–81	0–1	14 – Jacobs	8 – Milton	5 – Milton	College Park Center (2,182); Arlington, TX
November 13, 2021*; 2:00 p.m.		Sam Houston State	W 72–54	1–1	26 – Jacobs	6 – Ferrell	9 – Milton	College Park Center (1,008); Arlington, TX
November 17, 2021*; 6:00 p.m.		Houston	W 69–66 ^{OT}	2–1	26 – Milton	7 – Ferrell	7 – Ferrell	College Park Center (885); Arlington, TX
November 20, 2021*; 3:30 p.m.		at North Texas	W 75–74 ^{OT}	3–1	20 – Benjamin	7 – Tied	6 – Ferrell	UNT Coliseum (1,376); Denton, TX
November 27, 2021*; Noon		at UNLV; UNLV Thanksgiving Classic	W 75–72	4–1	28 – Jacobs	9 – Tied	8 – Ferrell	Cox Pavilion (111); Paradise, NV
November 28, 2021*; 2:30 p.m.		vs. Kansas City; UNLV Thanksgiving Classic	L 76–85	4–2	27 – Jacobs	5 – Milton	7 – Milton	Cox Pavilion (471); Paradise, NV
December 2, 2021*; 6:00 p.m.		No. 13 South Florida	W 61–56	5–2	14 – Milton	9 – Jacobs	4 – Tied	College Park Center (630); Arlington, TX
December 4, 2021*; 2:00 p.m.		Rice	W 73–65	6–2	20 – Jacobs	8 – Jacobs	7 – Ferrell	College Park Center (680); Arlington, TX
December 17, 2021*; 6:30 p.m.		at Oklahoma State	L 46–61	6–3	14 – Jacobs	7 – Ferrell	5 – Ferrell	Gallagher-Iba Arena (2,073); Stillwater, OK
December 21, 2021*		at SMU	Canceled					Moody Coliseum; Dallas, TX
Sun Belt regular season
December 30, 2021; 6:00 p.m.		at Louisiana	W 62–60	7–3 (1–0)	24 – Jacobs	6 – Tied	7 – Ferrell	Cajundome (192); Lafayette, LA
January 1, 2022; 2:00 p.m.		at Louisiana–Monroe	W 72–56	8–3 (2–0)	20 – Jacobs	8 – Tied	4 – Halverson	Fant–Ewing Coliseum (102); Monroe, LA
January 6, 2022; 6:00 p.m.		South Alabama	Canceled					College Park Center; Arlington, TX
January 8, 2022; 2:00 p.m.		Troy	L 48–59	8–4 (2–1)	14 – Jacobs	10 – Milton	5 – Ferrell	College Park Center (1,246); Arlington, TX
January 13, 2022; 6:00 p.m.		at Georgia State	W 82–68	9–4 (3–1)	22 – Jacobs	5 – Chastain	4 – Tied	GSU Sports Arena (418); Atlanta, GA
January 15, 2022; 2:00 p.m.		at Georgia Southern	L 63–64	9–5 (3–2)	15 – Tied	13 – Chastain	2 – Jacobs	Hanner Fieldhouse (454); Statesboro, GA
January 20, 2022; 7:00 p.m.		Texas State	W 69–67	10–5 (4–2)	21 – Benjamin	8 – Milton	6 – Milton	College Park Center (1,077); Arlington, TX
January 22, 2022; 2:00 p.m.		at Texas State	W 72–65	11–5 (5–2)	28 – Jacobs	8 – Jacobs	6 – Milton	Strahan Arena (1,057); San Marcos, TX
January 27, 2022; 7:00 p.m.		at Arkansas State	W 90–87	12–5 (6–2)	32 – Jacobs	8 – Chastain	9 – Ferrell	First National Bank Arena (608); Jonesboro, AR
January 29, 2022; 2:00 p.m.		at Little Rock	W 64–53	13–5 (7–2)	24 – Jacobs	5 – Tied	3 – Tied	Jack Stephens Center (1,901); Little Rock, AR
February 6, 2022; 1:00 p.m.		Appalachian State	W 88–79	14–5 (8–2)	33 – Jacobs	10 – Jacobs	10 – Milton	College Park Center (917); Arlington, TX
February 10, 2022; 11:30 a.m.		Louisiana–Monroe	W 77–50	15–5 (9–2)	17 – Jacobs	8 – Jacobs	5 – Chastain	College Park Center (3,382); Arlington, TX
February 12, 2022; 2:00 p.m.		Louisiana	L 57–62	15–6 (9–3)	16 – Milton	10 – Ferrell	7 – Ferrell	College Park Center (877); Arlington, TX
February 19, 2022; 1:00 p.m.		at Coastal Carolina	W 70–61	16–6 (10–3)	16 – Jacobs	8 – Tied	4 – Tied	HTC Center (732); Conway, SC
February 25, 2022; 11:00 a.m.		Little Rock	W 63–54	17–6 (11–3)	13 – Tied	6 – Milton	4 – Tied	College Park Center (602); Arlington, TX
February 26, 2022; 2:00 p.m.		Arkansas State	L 75–82	17–7 (11–4)	25 – Jacobs	12 – Jacobs	11 – Milton	College Park Center (965); Arlington, TX
Sun Belt Tournament
March 4, 2022; 7:30 p.m., ESPN+	(2)	vs. (7) Georgia Southern; Quarterfinals	W 85–76	18–7	28 – Jacobs	9 – Jacobs	5 – Ferrell	Pensacola Bay Center (652); Pensacola, FL
March 6, 2022; 2:00 p.m., ESPN+	(2)	vs. (3) Louisiana; Semifinals	W 75–65	19–7	28 – Jacobs	10 – Jacobs	9 – Ferrell	Pensacola Bay Center (944); Pensacola, FL
March 7, 2022; 1:00 p.m., ESPNU	(2)	vs. (1) Troy; Final	W 76–61	20–7	28 – Jacobs	11 – Jacobs	6 – Milton	Pensacola Bay Center (904); Pensacola, FL
NCAA tournament
March 18, 2022; 9:00 p.m., ESPNU	(14 G)	at (3 G) No. 10 Iowa State; First Round	L 71–78	20–8	19 – Jacobs	8 – Smith	4 – Milton	Hilton Coliseum (5,546); Ames, IA
*Non-conference game. ^{#}Rankings from AP Poll. (#) Tournament seedings in parentheses. G=Greensboro. All times are in Central Time.

== Rankings ==
Ranking movements Legend: — = Not ranked
	Week																		
Poll	Pre	1	2	3	4	5	6	7	8	9	10	11	12	13	14	15	16	17	Final
AP	—	—	—	—	—	—	—	—	—	—	—	—	—	—	—	—	—	—	—
Coaches	—	—	—	—	—	—	—	—	—	—	—	—	—	—	—	—	—	—	—

Legend
	Increase in ranking
	Decrease in ranking
	Not ranked previous week
(RV)	Received votes
(NR)	Not ranked and did not receive votes

The Coaches Poll did not release a Week 2 poll, and the AP Poll did not release a poll after the NCAA Tournament.
