= 2021–22 Georgia State Panthers women's basketball team =

Intercollegiate basketball season

2021–22 Georgia State Panthers women's basketball
- Conference: Sun Belt Conference
- Record: 10–16 (4–9 Sun Belt)
- Head coach: Gene Hill (4th season)
- Assistant coaches: Sherill Baker; A. G. Hall; Roddreka Rogers
- Home arena: GSU Sports Arena

2021–22 Sun Belt Conference women's basketball standings
	Conf.				Overall
Team	W		L	PCT	W		L	PCT
Troy	13	–	2	.867	24	–	9	.727
UT Arlington †	11	–	4	.733	20	–	8	.714
Louisiana	9	–	4	.692	18	–	7	.720
Appalachian State	8	–	4	.667	14	–	12	.538
Little Rock	8	–	4	.667	17	–	10	.630
Texas State	9	–	6	.600	15	–	14	.517
Georgia Southern	8	–	6	.571	18	–	10	.643
Arkansas State	5	–	9	.357	12	–	16	.429
Coastal Carolina	4	–	9	.308	15	–	11	.577
Georgia State	4	–	9	.308	10	–	16	.385
South Alabama	2	–	10	.167	8	–	18	.308
Louisiana–Monroe	0	–	14	.000	4	–	25	.138
† 2022 Sun Belt tournament winner

The 2021–22 Georgia State Panthers women's basketball team represented Georgia State University during the 2021–22 NCAA Division I women's basketball season. The basketball team, led by fourth-year head coach Gene Hill, played all home games, for the final season, at the GSU Sports Arena along with the Georgia State Panthers men's basketball team. They were members of the Sun Belt Conference.

== Roster ==
2021–22 Georgia State Panthers women's basketball team
Players
Coaches

Pos.	#	Name	Height	Year	Previous school	Hometown
G	1	Jenae Dublin	6 ft 2 in (1.88 m)	So	Gwynn Park HS	Suitland, MD
G	2	Mikyla Tolivert	5 ft 6 in (1.68 m)	Fr	Palm Bay Magnet HS	Melbourne, FL
G	4	Moriah Taylor	5 ft 4 in (1.63 m)	Jr	Hartselle HS	Hartselle, AL
G	5	Ciara Smith	5 ft 9 in (1.75 m)	So	Riverwood International Charter	Atlanta, GA
G	10	Kamryn Dziak	5 ft 8 in (1.73 m)	Jr	M. L. Steele HS	Amherst, OH
F	11	Deasia Merrill	6 ft 1 in (1.85 m)	RS So	Villa Rica HS	Villa Rica, GA
G	12	Tehya Lyons	5 ft 7 in (1.7 m)	RS Jr	Norcross HS	Norcross, GA
G	13	Nyla Jean	5 ft 4 in (1.63 m)	Fr	H. B. Plant HS	Tampa, FL
G	14	Ashley Foster	5 ft 8 in (1.73 m)	Sr	Eagle's Landing HS	McDonough, GA
F	20	Alyssa Phillip	6 ft 0 in (1.83 m)	Fr	Wesleyan	Norcross, GA
G	21	Taniyah Worth	6 ft 0 in (1.83 m)	RS Jr	Flowery Branch HS	Flowery Branch, GA
C	30	Elexus Bell	6 ft 1 in (1.85 m)	Sr	Carrollton HS	Carrollton, GA
G	32	Taylor Henderson	5 ft 10 in (1.78 m)	Jr	Center Point HS	Birmingham, AL
F	35	Hannah Sadler	6 ft 3 in (1.91 m)	RS Jr	Parkview HS	Lilburn, GA
F	55	Alex Gitchenko	5 ft 11 in (1.8 m)	Fr		Ashdod, Israel

Head coach

- Gene Hill (Coker)

Assistant coach(es)

- Sherill Baker (Georgia)
- A. G. Hall (North Carolina Central)
- Roddreka Rogers (Georgia Tech)

Legend

- (C) Team captain
- (S) Suspended
- (I) Ineligible
- (W) Walk-on
- Injured
- Current redshirt

Roster
Last update: December 23, 2022

== Schedule and results ==
Date time, TV	Rank^{#}	Opponent^{#}	Result	Record	High points	High rebounds	High assists	Site city, state
Non-conference regular season
November 9, 2021*; 5:00 p.m., SECN+		at Florida	L 70–84	0–1	19 – Foster	6 – Foster	3 – tied	O'Connell Center (639); Gainesville, FL
November 12, 2021*; 10:00 a.m., ESPN+		Tennessee State	L 67–70	0–2	15 – Foster	8 – Worth	6 – Jean	GSU Sports Arena (384); Atlanta, GA
November 14, 2021*; 2:00 p.m., ESPN+		Life	W 69–47	1–2	11 – Worth	7 – tied	3 – tied	GSU Sports Arena (494); Atlanta, GA
November 17, 2021*; 6:00 p.m., ESPN+		Brewton–Parker	W 80–40	2–2	12 – Foster	7 – Phillip	3 – tied	GSU Sports Arena (407); Atlanta, GA
November 20, 2021*; 2:00 p.m., ESPN+		at North Alabama	L 90–91 ^{OT}	2–3	24 – Bell	7 – tied	3 – Worth	Flowers Hall (574); Florence, AL
December 22, 2021*; 6:00 p.m.		at Alabama A&M	W 62–61	3–3	15 – Henderson	7 – Foster	3 – Henderson	Elmore Gymnasium (776); Normal, AL
December 27, 2021*; 1:30 p.m., ESPN+		at Chattanooga	W 77–66	4–3	16 – Worth	6 – Worth	3 – tied	McKenzie Arena (1,038); Chattanooga, TN
December 1, 2021*; 5:30 p.m., ESPN+		Southern Miss	L 56–64	4–4	16 – Foster	6 – Worth	4 – tied	GSU Sports Arena (427); Atlanta, GA
December 12, 2021*; 2:00 p.m., SECN+		at No. 9 Tennessee	L 60–84	4–5	13 – Worth	5 – Foster	4 – Lyons	Thompson–Boling Arena (6,312); Knoxville, TN
December 14, 2021*; 6:00 p.m., ESPN+		Florida A&M	W 61–52	5–5	17 – Foster	7 – Gitchenko	3 – Foster	GSU Sports Arena (429); Atlanta, GA
December 18, 2021*; 2:00 p.m., ESPN+		Tulsa; GSU Holiday Classic	L 55–67	5–6	16 – Henderson	6 – Bell	2 – tied	GSU Sports Arena (442); Atlanta, GA
December 19, 2021*; 2:00 p.m., ESPN+		Charleston Southern; GSU Holiday Classic	W 55–50	6–6	11 – tied	10 – Henderson	5 – Foster	GSU Sports Arena (450); Atlanta, GA
CAA regular season
December 30, 2021; 12:00 p.m.		Little Rock	Postponed					GSU Sports Arena; Atlanta, GA
January 1, 2022; 2:00 p.m., ESPN+		at Arkansas State	Postponed					First National Bank Arena; Jonesboro, AR
January 6, 2022; 6:00 p.m., ESPN+		at Appalachian State	Postponed					Holmes Center; Boone, NC
January 8, 2022; 2:00 p.m., ESPN+		at Coastal Carolina	L 51–75	6–7 (0–1)	11 – Jean	6 – Merrill	2 – tied	HTC Center (380); Conway, SC
January 13, 2022; 6:00 p.m., ESPN+		UT Arlington	L 68–82	6–8 (0–2)	14 – Sadler	6 – Gitchenko	7 – Henderson	GSU Sports Arena (418); Atlanta, GA
January 15, 2022; 2:00 p.m., ESPN+		Texas State	L 55–73	6–9 (0–3)	13 – Jean	6 – tied	2 – Henderson	GSU Sports Arena (427); Atlanta, GA
January 22, 2022; 11:30 p.m., ESPN+		Georgia Southern	W 58–56	7–9 (1–3)	16 – Foster	6 – Phillip	3 – Foster	GSU Sports Arena (551); Atlanta, GA
January 27, 2022; 6:00 p.m., ESPN+		South Alabama	W 72–66 ^{OT}	8–9 (2–3)	18 – Foster	9 – Foster	4 – Gitchenko	GSU Sports Arena (431); Atlanta, GA
January 29, 2022; 2:00 p.m., ESPN+		Troy	L 56–60	8–10 (2–4)	11 – Merrill	6 – tied	4 – Gitchenko	GSU Sports Arena (554); Atlanta, GA
February 5, 2022; 1:00 p.m., ESPN+		at Georgia Southern	L 61–71	8–11 (2–5)	15 – Lyons	5 – Gitchenko	2 – tied	Hanner Fieldhouse (832); Statesboro, GA
February 10, 2022; 6:00 p.m., ESPN+		Coastal Carolina	L 62–69	8–12 (2–6)	12 – tied	5 – Merrill	3 – Lyons	GSU Sports Arena (409); Atlanta, GA
February 12, 2022; 2:00 p.m., ESPN+		Appalachian State	L 78–84 ^{OT}	8–13 (2–7)	14 – tied	4 – tied	4 – Jean	GSU Sports Arena (463); Atlanta, GA
February 17, 2022; 7:00 p.m., ESPN+		at Troy	L 56–67	8–14 (2–8)	14 – Foster	5 – Phillip	5 – Lyons	Trojan Arena (1,246); Troy, AL
February 19, 2022; 4:00 p.m., ESPN+		at South Alabama	W 60–57 ^{OT}	9–14 (3–8)	13 – tied	6 – tied	3 – Jean	Mitchell Center (379); Mobile, AL
February 24, 2022; 7:00 p.m., ESPN+		at Louisiana	L 48–64	9–15 (3–9)	11 – Merrill	6 – Merrill	1 – tied	Cajundome (269); Lafayette, LA
February 26, 2022; 3:00 p.m., ESPN+		at Louisiana–Monroe	W 76–65	10–15 (4–9)	16 – Merrill	6 – Merrill	4 – Foster	Fant–Ewing Coliseum (296); Monroe, LA
Sun Belt tournament
March 2, 2022; 3:00 p.m., ESPN+	(10)	vs. (7) Georgia Southern; First round	L 79–88	10–16	15 – Worth	4 – Merrill	5 – Jean	Pensacola Bay Center (655); Pensacola, FL
*Non-conference game. ^{#}Rankings from AP poll. (#) Tournament seedings in parentheses. All times are in Eastern.

== See also ==
- 2021–22 Georgia State Panthers men's basketball team
