= 2021–22 Little Rock Trojans women's basketball team =

Intercollegiate basketball season

2021–22 Little Rock Trojans women's basketball
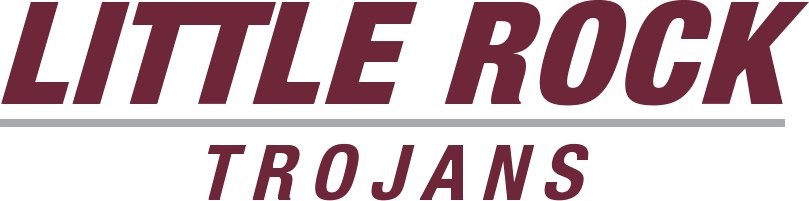
- Conference: Sun Belt Conference
- Record: 17–10 (8–4 Sun Belt)
- Head coach: Joe Foley (19th season)
- Assistant coaches: Alicia Cash; Steve Wiedower; Bobby Brasel
- Home arena: Jack Stephens Center

2021–22 Sun Belt Conference women's basketball standings
	Conf.				Overall
Team	W		L	PCT	W		L	PCT
Troy	13	–	2	.867	24	–	9	.727
UT Arlington †	11	–	4	.733	20	–	8	.714
Louisiana	9	–	4	.692	18	–	7	.720
Appalachian State	8	–	4	.667	14	–	12	.538
Little Rock	8	–	4	.667	17	–	10	.630
Texas State	9	–	6	.600	15	–	14	.517
Georgia Southern	8	–	6	.571	18	–	10	.643
Arkansas State	5	–	9	.357	12	–	16	.429
Coastal Carolina	4	–	9	.308	15	–	11	.577
Georgia State	4	–	9	.308	10	–	16	.385
South Alabama	2	–	10	.167	8	–	18	.308
Louisiana–Monroe	0	–	14	.000	4	–	25	.138
† 2022 Sun Belt tournament winner

The 2021–22 Little Rock Trojans women's basketball team represented the University of Arkansas at Little Rock during the 2021–22 NCAA Division I women's basketball season. The basketball team, led by nineteenth-year head coach Joe Foley, played all home games at the Jack Stephens Center along with the Little Rock Trojans men's basketball team. They were members of the Sun Belt Conference.

== Roster ==
2021–22 Little Rock Trojans women's basketball team
Players
Coaches

Pos.	#	Name	Height	Year	Previous school	Hometown
G	0	Raziya Potter	5 ft 9 in (1.75 m)	Sr	Kimball HS; San Jose State	Tracy, California
G	1	Hailey Hohenecker	5 ft 4 in (1.63 m)	RS Fr	Providence; St. Thomas	Plymouth, Minnesota
F	2	Salimatou Kourouma	5 ft 11 in (1.8 m)	RS So	Life Prep; Grayson	Kati, Mali
F	10	Krystan Vornes	6 ft 2 in (1.88 m)	Sr	Osceola HS; Tulsa	Osceola, Arkansas
G	12	Tia Harvey	5 ft 9 in (1.75 m)	So	Sachse HS	Sachse, Texas
F	13	Dariel Johnson	6 ft 1 in (1.85 m)	Sr	Pasadena HS; Pasadena CC	Pasadena, California
F	14	Azaria Robinson	6 ft 2 in (1.88 m)	Jr	West Anchorage HS; New Mexico	Anchorage, Alaska
G	22	Mikayla Eddins	5 ft 10 in (1.78 m)	Fr	Plano Senior HS	Plano, Texas
G	24	Mayra Caicedo	5 ft 3 in (1.6 m)	Sr	San Vincente de Paul HS; New Mexico JC	Buga, Colombia
F	34	Angelique Francis	5 ft 11 in (1.8 m)	Jr	MacArthur HS	Irving, Texas

Head coach

- Joe Foley (Central Arkansas)

Assistant coach(es)

- Alicia Cash (Little Rock)
- Steve Wiedower (Central Arkansas)
- Bobby Brasel (UT Permian Basin)

Legend

- (C) Team captain
- (S) Suspended
- (I) Ineligible
- (W) Walk-on
- Injured
- Current redshirt

Roster
Last update: 19 December 2022

== Schedule and results ==
Date time, TV	Rank^{#}	Opponent^{#}	Result	Record	High points	High rebounds	High assists	Site city, state
Non-conference Regular Season
11/09/2021*; 7:30 p.m., ESPN+		Missouri State	L 62–76	0–1	16 – Potter	8 – Vornes	6 – Caicedo	Jack Stephens Center (1,743); Little Rock, AR
11/12/2021*; 7:00 p.m., SECN+		at Vanderbilt	W 56–40	1–1	30 – Kourouma	6 – Francis	5 – Caicedo	Memorial Gymnasium (1,633); Nashville, TN
11/16/2021*; 6:30 p.m., ESPN+		Arkansas–Pine Bluff	W 73–63	2–1	24 – Kourouma	14 – Francis	4 – Potter	Jack Stephens Center (747); Little Rock, AR
11/18/2021*; 6:30 p.m., ESPN+		Memphis	W 55–50	3–1	32 – Kourouma	10 – Kourouma	5 – Caicedo	Jack Stephens Center (763); Little Rock, AR
11/24/2021*; 12:00 p.m., ESPN+		Auburn	W 57–49	4–1	16 – Kourouma	10 – Vornes	8 – Caicedo	Jack Stephens Center (656); Little Rock, AR
11/27/2021*; 11:00 a.m.		vs. Abilene Christian; ORU Thanksgiving Classic	L 61–66	4–2	16 – Potter	16 – Vornes	5 – Caicedo	Mabee Center; Tulsa, OK
11/28/2021*; 2:00 p.m.		at Oral Roberts; ORU Thanksgiving Classic	L 56–74	4–3	13 – Vornes	9 – Vornes	3 – Harvey	Mabee Center (1,565); Tulsa, OK
12/01/2021*; 11:00 a.m., SECN+		at No. 17 Texas A&M	L 50–65	4–4	23 – Potter	9 – Francis	4 – Caicedo	Reed Arena (6,414); College Station, TX
12/04/2021*; 2:00 p.m., ESPN+		Central Arkansas; Governor's I-40 Showdown	W 62–38	5–4	20 – Kourouma	7 – Johnson	4 – Tied	Jack Stephens Center (728); Little Rock, AR
12/12/2021*; 4:00 p.m., SECN		at Arkansas	L 39–73	5–5	8 – Tied	9 – Francis	2 – Conn	Bud Walton Arena (3,451); Fayetteville, AR
12/16/2021*; 6:30 p.m., ESPN+		Alabama	Postponed					Jack Stephens Center; Little Rock, AR
12/20/2021*; 2:15 p.m.		vs. Bradley; Tulane Classic	Postponed					Devlin Fieldhouse; New Orleans, LA
Conference Regular Season
12/30/2021; 11:00 a.m., ESPN+		at Georgia State	Postponed					GSU Sports Arena; Atlanta, GA
01/01/2022; 1:00 p.m., ESPN+		Georgia Southern	Postponed					Jack Stephens Center; Little Rock, AR
01/06/2022; 6:30 p.m., ESPN+		Louisiana–Monroe	Postponed					Jack Stephens Center; Little Rock, AR
01/08/2022; 2:00 p.m., ESPN+		Louisiana	Postponed					Jack Stephens Center; Little Rock, AR
01/13/2022; 6:30 p.m., ESPN+		Coastal Carolina	W 54–50	6–5 (1–0)	23 – Kourouma	11 – Vornes	9 – Caicedo	Jack Stephens Center (1,814); Little Rock, AR
01/15/2022; 1:00 p.m., ESPN+		Appalachian State	L 49–60	6–6 (1–1)	15 – Kourouma	11 – Johnson	5 – Caicedo	Jack Stephens Center (1,823); Little Rock, AR
01/20/2022; 6:00 p.m., ESPN+		at Troy	W 68–66	7–6 (2–1)	24 – Potter	9 – Johnson	9 – Caicedo	Trojan Arena (1,801); Troy, AL
01/22/2022; 3:00 p.m., ESPN+		at South Alabama	W 74–52	8–6 (3–1)	15 – Tied	8 – Potter	4 – Caicedo	Mitchell Center (315); Mobile, AL
01/27/2022; 11:30 a.m., ESPN+		Texas State	L 65–69 ^{3OT}	8–7 (3–2)	21 – Kourouma	9 – Tied	4 – Tied	Jack Stephens Center (1,665); Little Rock, AR
01/29/2022; 2:00 p.m., ESPN+		UT Arlington	L 53–64	8–8 (3–3)	23 – Potter	9 – Kourouma	3 – Tied	Jack Stephens Center (1,901); Little Rock, AR
02/03/2022; 6:00 p.m., ESPN+		at Louisiana	W 51–50	9–8 (4–3)	14 – Johnson	11 – Johnson	5 – Tied	Cajundome (303); Lafayette, LA
02/05/2022; 2:00 p.m., ESPN+		at Louisiana–Monroe	W 64–47	10–8 (5–3)	22 – Potter	9 – Tied	6 – Caicedo	Fant–Ewing Coliseum (957); Monroe, LA
Non-conference Regular Season
02/08/2022*; 6:30 p.m., ESPN+		Philander Smith	W 56–49	11–8	15 – Robinson	22 – Robinson	6 – Caicedo	Jack Stephens Center (702); Little Rock, AR
Conference Regular Season
02/12/2022; 2:00 p.m., ESPN+		Arkansas State; Homecoming	W 64–55	12–8 (6–3)	18 – Potter	7 – Johnson	5 – Harvey	Jack Stephens Center (2,269); Little Rock, AR
Non-conference Regular Season
02/14/2022*; 6:30 p.m., ESPN+		Champion Christian; Senior Day	W 88–36	13–8	16 – Tied	10 – Johnson	7 – Potter	Jack Stephens Center (322); Little Rock, AR
Conference Regular Season
02/19/2022; 1:00 p.m., ESPN+		at Arkansas State	W 73–69	14–8 (7–3)	22 – Kourouma	11 – Kourouma	7 – Harvey	First National Bank Arena (693); Jonesboro, AR
02/25/2022; 11:00 a.m., ESPN+		at UT Arlington	L 54–63	14–9 (7–4)	15 – Potter	11 – Kourouma	7 – Harvey	College Park Center (602); Arlington, TX
02/26/2022; 2:00 p.m., ESPN+		at Texas State	W 70–53	15–9 (8–4)	29 – Kourouma	14 – Johnson	9 – Caicedo	Strahan Arena (843); San Marcos, TX
Sun Belt Tournament
03/02/2022; 2:00 p.m., ESPN+	(5)	vs. (12) Louisiana–Monroe; First Round	W 61–56	16–9	21 – Kourouma	10 – Johnson	5 – Caicedo	Pensacola Bay Center; Pensacola, FL
03/04/2022; 2:00 p.m., ESPN+	(5)	vs. (4) Appalachian State; Quarterfinals	W 70–58	17–9	24 – Kourouma	15 – Johnson	7 – Potter	Pensacola Bay Center (585); Pensacola, FL
03/06/2022; 11:30 a.m., ESPN+	(5)	vs. (1) Troy; Semifinals	L 59–62	17–10	27 – Kourouma	7 – Francis	8 – Caicedo	Pensacola Bay Center (679); Pensacola, FL
*Non-conference game. ^{#}Rankings from AP Poll. (#) Tournament seedings in parentheses. All times are in Central Time.

== See also ==
- 2021–22 Little Rock Trojans men's basketball team
