= 2021–22 Georgia Southern Eagles women's basketball team =

Intercollegiate basketball season

2021–22 Georgia Southern Eagles women's basketball
- Conference: Sun Belt Conference
- Record: 18–10 (8–6 Sun Belt)
- Head coach: Anita Howard (3rd season)
- Assistant coaches: Deont'a McChester; Chris Straker
- Home arena: Hanner Fieldhouse

2021–22 Sun Belt Conference women's basketball standings
| | Conf. | | | | Overall |
| Team | W | | L | PCT | W | | L | PCT |
|---|---|---|---|---|---|---|---|---|
| Troy | 13 | – | 2 | .867 | 24 | – | 9 | .727 |
| UT Arlington † | 11 | – | 4 | .733 | 20 | – | 8 | .714 |
| Louisiana | 9 | – | 4 | .692 | 18 | – | 7 | .720 |
| Appalachian State | 8 | – | 4 | .667 | 14 | – | 12 | .538 |
| Little Rock | 8 | – | 4 | .667 | 17 | – | 10 | .630 |
| Texas State | 9 | – | 6 | .600 | 15 | – | 14 | .517 |
| Georgia Southern | 8 | – | 6 | .571 | 18 | – | 10 | .643 |
| Arkansas State | 5 | – | 9 | .357 | 12 | – | 16 | .429 |
| Coastal Carolina | 4 | – | 9 | .308 | 15 | – | 11 | .577 |
| Georgia State | 4 | – | 9 | .308 | 10 | – | 16 | .385 |
| South Alabama | 2 | – | 10 | .167 | 8 | – | 18 | .308 |
| Louisiana–Monroe | 0 | – | 14 | .000 | 4 | – | 25 | .138 |
† 2022 Sun Belt tournament winner

The 2021–22 Georgia Southern Eagles women's basketball team represented Georgia Southern University during the 2021–22 NCAA Division I women's basketball season. The basketball team, led by third-year head coach Anita Howard, played all home games at the Hanner Fieldhouse along with the Georgia Southern Eagles men's basketball team. They were members of the Sun Belt Conference.

== Roster ==
2021–22 Georgia Southern Eagles women's basketball team
Players
Coaches

| Pos. | # | Name | Height | Year | Previous school | Hometown |
|---|---|---|---|---|---|---|
| F | 0 | Maya Banks | 6 ft 4 in (1.93 m) | Sr | Hamilton HS; Wake Forest | Chandler, Arizona |
| G | 1 | Rachel Johnson | 5 ft 8 in (1.73 m) | Sr | Eufaula HS; Wichita State | Eufaula, Alabama |
| G | 2 | Daeja Holmes | 5 ft 9 in (1.75 m) | So | Herbert Hoover HS | Fresno, California |
| G | 3 | Terren Ward | 5 ft 11 in (1.8 m) | So | Wayne County HS | Jesup, Georgia |
| G | 4 | Constance Thomas | 5 ft 8 in (1.73 m) | So | Camp Jewell House; Penn State | Plant City, Florida |
| F | 5 | Tsubasa Nisbet | 6 ft 0 in (1.83 m) | Sr | Burnside HS | Christchurch, New Zealand |
| G | 10 | Mya Burns | 6 ft 0 in (1.83 m) | Jr | North Augusta HS | North Augusta, South Carolina |
| G | 12 | Kharringtin Collier | 5 ft 8 in (1.73 m) | Fr | Marietta HS | Marietta, Georgia |
| F | 13 | Thaniya Marks | 6 ft 1 in (1.85 m) | Jr | Wenonah HS; Shelton State CC | Birmingham, Alabama |
| F | 20 | Taya Gibson | 5 ft 11 in (1.8 m) | Jr | Rome HS; Columbus State | Rome, Georgia |
| G | 22 | Ja'nya Love-Hill | 5 ft 5 in (1.65 m) | Jr | G.W. Carver HS | Columbus, Georgia |
| G | 23 | Hannah Fuller | 5 ft 9 in (1.75 m) | Fr | Southside Christian | Greenville, South Carolina |
| G | 33 | Simone James | 5 ft 10 in (1.78 m) | So | Christian HS | San Diego, California |
| F | 41 | Eden Johnson | 6 ft 2 in (1.88 m) | RS So | Haines City HS; Fordham | Kissimmee, Florida |
| C | 55 | Lydia Freeman | 6 ft 5 in (1.96 m) | So | Westlake HS | Atlanta, Georgia |

Head coach

- Anita Howard (Armstrong State)

Assistant coach(es)

- Deont'a McChester (Tennessee State)
- Chris Straker (San Diego State)

Legend

- (C) Team captain
- (S) Suspended
- (I) Ineligible
- (W) Walk-on
- Injured
- Current redshirt

Roster
Last update: 21 December 2022

== Schedule and results ==
| Date time, TV | Rank^{#} | Opponent^{#} | Result | Record | High points | High rebounds | High assists | Site city, state |
Exhibition
| 11/04/2021*; 6:00 p.m. | | Allen | W 111–56 | | 14 – Freeman | 13 – Freeman | 5 – Tied | Hanner Fieldhouse; Statesboro, GA |
Non-conference Regular Season
| 11/11/2021*; 8:00 p.m., SECN+ | | at Auburn | W 68–66 | 1–0 | 12 – Burns | 13 – E. Johnson | 4 – Love–Hill | Neville Arena (2,122); Auburn, AL |
| 11/13/2021*; 1:00 p.m., ESPN+ | | Fort Valley State | W 99–71 | 2–0 | 15 – Ward | 9 – Banks | 3 – Love-Hill | Hanner Fieldhouse (476); Statesboro, GA |
| 12/17/2021*; 3:00 p.m., ESPN+ | | FIU | W 81–74 ^{OT} | 3–0 | 20 – Burns | 12 – E. Johnson | 3 – Tied | Hanner Fieldhouse (231); Stateboro, GA |
| 12/20/2021*; 2:00 p.m. | | at San Diego State | L 57–65 | 3–1 | 14 – Burns | 8 – Ward | 4 – Tied | Viejas Arena (905); San Diego, CA |
| 12/22/2021*; 11:00 p.m. | | vs. San Diego Christian | W 100–60 | 4–1 | 18 – James | 6 – Tied | 9 – Holmes | Salvation Army Kroc Center (75); El Cajon, CA |
| 11/26/2021*; 1:00 p.m., ESPN+ | | vs. South Carolina State; GATA Turkey Throwdown | W 72–57 | 5–1 | 21 – Ward | 10 – E. Johnson | 4 – Thomas | Hanner Fieldhouse (411); Statesboro, GA |
| 11/27/2021*; 3:30 p.m., ESPN+ | | Indiana State; GATA Turkey Throwdown | L 67–71 | 5–2 | 16 – Gibson | 8 – Ward | 4 – Ward | Hanner Fieldhouse (356); Statesboro, GA |
| 11/30/2021*; 5:00 p.m., FloSports | | at College of Charleston | W 85–65 | 6–2 | 17 – Ward | 9 – Banks | 2 – Tied | TD Arena (222); Charleston, SC |
| 12/11/2021*; 2:00 p.m., ESPN+ | | Gardner–Webb | W 121–105 | 7–2 | 24 – Burns | 7 – E. Johnson | 7 – Love-Hill | Hanner Fieldhouse (183); Statesboro, GA |
| 12/13/2021*; 11:00 a.m., ESPN+ | | Carver | W 133–15 | 8–2 | 18 – R. Johnson | 7 – Tied | 9 – Holmes | Hanner Fieldhouse (2,568); Statesboro, GA |
| 12/17/2021*; 7:00 p.m., ESPN+ | | at Kennesaw State | L 71–72 | 8–3 | 31 – Burns | 7 – Gibson | 5 – Love-Hill | KSU Convocation Center (668); Kennesaw, GA |
| 12/19/2021*; 3:00 p.m., ESPN+ | | Bethune–Cookman | W 88–59 | 9–3 | 14 – Burns | 11 – R. Johnson | 7 – Thomas | Hanner Fieldhouse (368); Statesboro, GA |
Conference Regular Season
| 12/30/2021; 2:00 p.m., ESPN+ | | Arkansas State | W 84–75 | 10–3 (1–0) | 23 – Burns | 7 – Tied | 4 – Love-Hill | Hanner Fieldhouse (312); Statesboro, GA |
| 01/01/2022; 2:00 p.m., ESPN+ | | at Little Rock | Postponed | | | | | Jack Stephens Center; Little Rock, AR |
| 01/06/2022; 6:00 p.m., ESPN+ | | at Coastal Carolina | L 69–72 | 10–4 (1–1) | 16 – Gibson | 8 – Gibson | 6 – Ward | HTC Center (346); Conway, SC |
| 01/08/2022; 2:00 p.m., ESPN+ | | at Appalachian State | Postponed | | | | | Holmes Center; Boone, NC |
| 01/13/2022; 6:00 p.m., ESPN+ | | Texas State | L 74–78 | 10–5 (1–2) | 23 – Ward | 7 – Banks | 3 – Burns | Hanner Fieldhouse (456); Statesboro, GA |
| 01/15/2022; 2:00 p.m., ESPN+ | | UT Arlington | W 64–63 | 11–5 (2–2) | 23 – Burns | 10 – Burns | 4 – Love-Hill | Hanner Fieldhouse (454); Statesboro, GA |
| 01/22/2022; 11:30 a.m., ESPN+ | | at Georgia State | L 56–58 | 11–6 (2–3) | 16 – Tied | 11 – Ward | 4 – Ward | GSU Sports Arena (551); Atlanta, GA |
| 01/27/2022; 6:00 p.m., ESPN+ | | Troy | L 72–78 | 11–7 (2–4) | 15 – Banks | 13 – Banks | 4 – Love-Hill | Hanner Fieldhouse (408); Statesboro, GA |
| 01/29/2022; 2:00 p.m., ESPN+ | | South Alabama | W 77–69 | 12–7 (3–4) | 19 – Ward | 17 – Ward | 5 – Love-Hill | Hanner Fieldhouse (507); Statesboro, GA |
| 02/05/2022; 1:00 p.m., ESPN+ | | Georgia State | W 71–61 | 13–7 (4–4) | 22 – Ward | 10 – Tied | 3 – James | Hanner Fieldhouse (832); Statesboro, GA |
| 02/10/2022; 6:00 p.m., ESPN+ | | Appalachian State | W 82–80 ^{OT} | 14–7 (5–4) | 32 – Ward | 9 – Ward | 7 – Love-Hill | Hanner Fieldhouse (381); Statesboro, GA |
| 02/12/2022; 2:00 p.m., ESPN+ | | Coastal Carolina; Senior Day | W 90–75 | 15–7 (6–4) | 30 – Ward | 8 – Ward | 5 – Love-Hill | Hanner Fieldhouse (842); Statesboro, GA |
| 02/17/2022; 8:00 p.m., ESPN+ | | at South Alabama | W 68–56 | 16–7 (7–4) | 21 – Ward | 12 – Ward | 5 – Thomas | Mitchell Center (258); Mobile, AL |
| 02/19/2022; 5:00 p.m., ESPN+ | | at Troy | L 70–82 | 16–8 (7–5) | 21 – Tied | 12 – Ward | 3 – Ward | Trojan Arena (1,455); Troy, AL |
| 02/24/2022*; 7:30 p.m., ESPN+ | | at Louisiana–Monroe | W 83–68 | 17–8 (8–5) | 15 – Holmes | 5 – Gibson | 6 – Love-Hill | Fant–Ewing Coliseum (346); Monroe, LA |
| 02/26/2022*; 3:00 p.m., ESPN+ | | at Louisiana | L 54–56 | 17–9 (8–6) | 15 – Holmes | 8 – Ward | 3 – Thomas | Cajundome (169); Lafayette, LA |
Sun Belt Tournament
| 03/02/2022; 8:30 p.m., ESPN+ | (7) | vs. (10) Georgia State; First Round | W 88–79 | 18–9 | 20 – Burns | 8 – Tied | 6 – Love-Hill | Pensacola Bay Center (655); Pensacola, FL |
| 03/04/2022; 8:30 p.m., ESPN+ | (7) | vs. (2) UT Arlington; Quarterfinals | L 76–85 | 18–10 | 16 – Gibson | 10 – Gibson | 5 – Thomas | Pensacola Bay Center (652); Pensacola, FL |
*Non-conference game. ^{#}Rankings from AP Poll. (#) Tournament seedings in parentheses. All times are in Eastern Time.

== See also ==
- 2021–22 Georgia Southern Eagles men's basketball team
