= 2021–22 Louisiana Ragin' Cajuns women's basketball team =

Intercollegiate basketball season

2021–22 Louisiana Ragin' Cajuns women's basketball
- Conference: Sun Belt Conference
- Record: 18–7 (9–4 Sun Belt)
- Head coach: Garry Brodhead (10th season)
- Assistant coaches: Deacon Jones; Valerie Huizar; M. C. Vogt
- Home arena: Cajundome

2021–22 Sun Belt Conference women's basketball standings
| | Conf. | | | | Overall |
| Team | W | | L | PCT | W | | L | PCT |
|---|---|---|---|---|---|---|---|---|
| Troy | 13 | – | 2 | .867 | 24 | – | 9 | .727 |
| UT Arlington † | 11 | – | 4 | .733 | 20 | – | 8 | .714 |
| Louisiana | 9 | – | 4 | .692 | 18 | – | 7 | .720 |
| Appalachian State | 8 | – | 4 | .667 | 14 | – | 12 | .538 |
| Little Rock | 8 | – | 4 | .667 | 17 | – | 10 | .630 |
| Texas State | 9 | – | 6 | .600 | 15 | – | 14 | .517 |
| Georgia Southern | 8 | – | 6 | .571 | 18 | – | 10 | .643 |
| Arkansas State | 5 | – | 9 | .357 | 12 | – | 16 | .429 |
| Coastal Carolina | 4 | – | 9 | .308 | 15 | – | 11 | .577 |
| Georgia State | 4 | – | 9 | .308 | 10 | – | 16 | .385 |
| South Alabama | 2 | – | 10 | .167 | 8 | – | 18 | .308 |
| Louisiana–Monroe | 0 | – | 14 | .000 | 4 | – | 25 | .138 |
† 2022 Sun Belt tournament winner

The 2021–22 Louisiana Ragin' Cajuns women's basketball team represented the University of Louisiana at Lafayette during the 2021–22 NCAA Division I women's basketball season. The Ragin' Cajuns, led by tenth-year head coach Garry Brodhead, played all home games at the Cajundome along with the Louisiana Ragin' Cajuns men's basketball team. They were members of the Sun Belt Conference.

== Previous season ==
The Ragin' Cajuns finished the 2020–21 season 16–8, 13–1 in Sun Belt play to finish as Western Divisional champions for the first time in program history. They made it to the 2020-21 Sun Belt Conference women's basketball tournament where the ultimately lost to Eastern Divisional champion Troy in the championship. As conference regular season champion, the Cajuns were one of nine automatic bids to the 2021 WNIT. They finished 0–2 in the tournament, where they were defeated by eventual Quarterfinalist Colorado in the first round and OVC regular season champs UT Martin in the consolation round.

== Offseason ==
=== Departures ===
| Name | Number | Pos. | Height | Year | Hometown | Notes |
|---|---|---|---|---|---|---|
| Alexandria Goodly | 0 | G | 5'5" | Sophomore | Lake Charles, Louisiana | Released/Quit |
| Kimberly Burton | 1 | F | 5'11" | Senior | Coushatta, Louisiana | Graduated |
| Skyler Goodwin | 11 | G/F | 5'8" | Senior | Baton Rouge, Louisiana | Graduated |
| Bre'Yelle Porter | 21 | F | 6'2" | Redshirt Freshman | Lafayette, Louisiana | Released/Quit |
| Kristen Daniels | 23 | F | 5'11" | Redshirt Junior | Lake Charles, Louisiana | Transferred to Texas A&M–Corpus Christi |
| Jomyra Mathis | 24 | G/F | 5'8" | Senior | New Orleans, Louisiana | Graduated |

=== Transfers ===
| Name | Number | Pos. | Height | Year | Hometown | Old School |
|---|---|---|---|---|---|---|
| Destiny Rice | 24 | G | 5'8" | Sophomore | Shreveport, Louisiana | Alabama |
| Lanay Wheaton | 4 | G | 5'7" | Freshman | Hope, Arkansas | Old Dominion |

=== Recruiting ===
College recruiting information
| Name | Hometown | School | Height | Weight | Commit date |
|---|---|---|---|---|---|
| Ashlyn Jones; Forward | Houston, TX | Klein Oak HS | 6 ft 0 in (1.83 m) | N/A | May 11, 2020 |
| Ashlyn Jones; Forward | Recruit ratings: No ratings found | | | | |
| Alicia Blanton; Guard | Richmond, TX | Foster HS | 5 ft 9 in (1.75 m) | N/A | May 12, 2020 |
| Alicia Blanton; Guard | Recruit ratings: No ratings found | | | | |
| Indiana Bodley; Guard | Melbourne, Australia | Marymede Catholic | 5 ft 10 in (1.78 m) | N/A | Nov 11, 2020 |
| Indiana Bodley; Guard | Recruit ratings: No ratings found | | | | |
| Skyler Christmas; Point guard | Slidell, LA | Salmen HS | 5 ft 5 in (1.65 m) | N/A | May 27, 2020 |
| Skyler Christmas; Point guard | Recruit ratings: No ratings found | | | | |
| Jaylyn Jones; Guard | Mandeville, LA | Mandeville HS | 5 ft 8 in (1.73 m) | N/A | Mar 28, 2020 |
| Jaylyn Jones; Guard | Recruit ratings: No ratings found | | | | |
Overall recruit ranking:
Note: In many cases, Scout, Rivals, 247Sports, On3, and ESPN may conflict in their listings of height and weight.; In these cases, the average was taken. ESPN grades are on a 100-point scale.; Sources: "Louisiana 2021-22 Basketball Commits". ESPN.; "2021-22 Team Ranking". Rivals.com.

== Roster ==
2021–22 Louisiana Ragin' Cajuns women's basketball team
Players
Coaches

| Pos. | # | Name | Height | Year | Previous school | Hometown |
|---|---|---|---|---|---|---|
| F | 0 | Ashlyn Jones | 6 ft 0 in (1.83 m) | Fr | Klein Oak HS | Houston, TX |
| G | 1 | Indiana Bodley | 5 ft 10 in (1.78 m) | Fr | Marymede Catholic | Melbourne, Australia |
| G | 2 | Brandi Williams | 5 ft 6 in (1.68 m) | Jr | Barbe HS | Lake Charles, LA |
| G | 3 | Makayia Hallmon | 5 ft 3 in (1.6 m) | So | Red River HS | Coushatta, LA |
| G | 4 | Lanay Wheaton | 5 ft 7 in (1.7 m) | Fr | Holmes HS; Old Dominion | Hope, AR |
| F | 5 | Tamera Johnson | 5 ft 11 in (1.8 m) | Fr | Lafayette Christian Academy | Lafayette, LA |
| PG | 13 | Skyler Christmas | 5 ft 5 in (1.65 m) | Fr | Salmen HS | Slidell, LA |
| G | 14 | Destiny McAfee | 5 ft 9 in (1.75 m) | Jr | Longview HS; Weatherford College | Longview, TX |
| G | 15 | Diamond Morrison | 5 ft 4 in (1.63 m) | Jr | East View HS | Georgetown, TX |
| F | 20 | Caira Wren | 5 ft 10 in (1.78 m) | So | McKinley Senior HS | Baton Rouge, LA |
| G | 22 | Jaylyn James | 5 ft 8 in (1.73 m) | Fr | Mandeville HS | Mandeville, LA |
| G | 23 | Alicia Blanton | 5 ft 9 in (1.75 m) | Fr | Foster HS | Richmond, TX |
| G | 24 | Destiny Rice | 5 ft 8 in (1.73 m) | So | North Caddo Magnet; Alabama | Shreveport, LA |
| F | 33 | Lafaedria Green | 6 ft 1 in (1.85 m) | Fr | Ouachita Parish HS | Monroe, LA |
| F | 35 | Ty'Reona Doucet | 6 ft 1 in (1.85 m) | Sr | Ville Platte HS | Ville Platte, LA |

Head coach

- Garry Boadhead (Louisiana)

Assistant coach(es)

- Deacon Jones (Louisiana)
- Valerie Huizar (LSU–Shreveport)
- M. C. Vogt (Texas A&M)

Legend

- (C) Team captain
- (S) Suspended
- (I) Ineligible
- (W) Walk-on
- Injured
- Current redshirt

Roster

== Schedule and results ==
| Date time, TV | Rank^{#} | Opponent^{#} | Result | Record | High points | High rebounds | High assists | Site city, state |
Exhibition
| 10/31/2021*; 4:00 p.m. | | Georgia Southwestern State | W 66–62 | | 14 – Johnson | 7 – Blanton | 3 – Wheaton | Cajundome (269); Lafayette, LA |
| 11/05/2021*; 6:00 p.m. | | Mississippi College | W 58–47 | | 10 – Hallmon | 6 – Johnson | 2 – Hallmon | Cajundome (169); Lafayette, LA |
Non-conference Regular Season
| 11/09/2021*; 5:00 p.m., ESPN+ | | Texas A&M–Kingsville | W 84–58 | 1–0 | 16 – Johnson | 5 – Wren | 7 – Rice | Cajundome (369); Lafayette, LA |
| 11/13/2021*; 7:00 p.m. | | at Rice | W 73–69 | 2–0 | 24 – Williams | 5 – Doucet | 3 – Johnson | Tudor Fieldhouse (462); Houston, TX |
| 11/18/2021*; 6:00 p.m., ESPN+ | | LSU | L 41–70 | 2–1 | 10 – Williams | 7 – Rice | 1 – Williams | Cajundome (2,711); Lafayette, LA |
| 11/20/2021*; 2:00 p.m., ESPN+ | | New Orleans | W 64–45 | 3–1 | 12 – Blanton | 6 – Morrison | 2 – Johnson | Cajundome (256); Lafayette, LA |
| 11/24/2021*; 7:00 p.m., ESPN+ | | at Southeastern Louisiana | W 54–52 | 4–1 | 16 – Hallmon | 6 – Hallmon | 3 – Hallmon | University Center (457); Hammond, LA |
| 11/28/2021*; 2:00 p.m. | | at McNeese State | W 67–57 | 5–1 | 14 – Hallmon | 9 – Johnson | 5 – Hallmon | The Legacy Center (1,063); Lake Charles, LA |
| 12/01/2021*; 6:00 p.m., ESPN+ | | Xavier (LA) | W 76–27 | 6–1 | 18 – Wheaton | 11 – Doucet | 4 – Rice | Cajundome (288); Lafayette, LA |
| 12/12/2021*; 2:00 p.m., ESPN+ | | at Houston | L 51–63 | 6–2 | 13 – Rice | 9 – Doucet | 5 – Rice | Fertitta Center (415); Houston, TX |
| 12/15/2021*; 11:00 a.m., ESPN+ | | LSU–Shreveport | W 90–45 | 7–2 | 21 – Johnson | 9 – Johnson | 5 – Rice | Cajundome; Lafayette, LA |
| 12/19/2021*; 4:00 p.m., ESPN+ | | Louisiana Tech | W 69–57 | 8–2 | 14 – Morrison | 8 – Doucet | 4 – Doucet | Cajundome (303); Lafayette, LA |
Conference Regular season
| 12/30/2021; 6:00 p.m., ESPN+ | | UT Arlington | L 60–62 | 8–3 (0–1) | 17 – Rice | 11 – Doucet | 4 – Rice | Cajundome (192); Lafayette, LA |
| 01/01/2022; 2:00 p.m., ESPN+ | | Texas State | W 78–72 | 9–3 (1–1) | 28 – Wheaton | 6 – Rice | 5 – Rice | Cajundome (252); Lafayette, LA |
| 01/06/2022; 2:00 p.m., ESPN+ | | at Arkansas State | Game cancelled | | | | | First National Bank Arena; Jonesboro, AR |
| 01/08/2022; 2:00 p.m., ESPN+ | | at Little Rock | Game cancelled | | | | | Jack Stephens Center; Little Rock, AR |
| 01/13/2022; 6:00 p.m., ESPN+ | | Troy | W 92–83 | 10–3 (2–1) | 23 – Doucet | 10 – Doucet | 3 – Morrison | Cajundome (242); Lafayette, LA |
| 01/15/2022; 3:00 p.m., ESPN+ | | at South Alabama | W 71–64 | 11–3 (3–1) | 17 – Wheaton | 18 – Doucet | 4 – Wheaton | Mitchell Center; Mobile, AL |
| 01/20/2022; 5:00 p.m., ESPN+ | | at Appalachian State | L 46–55 | 11–4 (3–2) | 19 – Doucet | 14 – Doucet | 1 – Johnson | Holmes Center (289); Boone, NC |
| 01/22/2022; 1:00 p.m., ESPN+ | | at Coastal Carolina | Game cancelled | | | | | HTC Center; Conway, SC |
| 01/29/2022; ESPN+ | | Louisiana–Monroe | W 76–55 | 12–4 (4–2) | 25 – Doucet | 14 – Doucet | 2 – Rice | Cajundome (388); Lafayette, LA |
| 02/03/2022; 6:00 p.m., ESPN+ | | Little Rock | L 50–51 | 12–5 (4–3) | 14 – Wheaton | 11 – Johnson | 1 – Wheaton | Cajundome (303); Lafayette, LA |
| 02/05/2022; 2:00 p.m., ESPN+ | | Arkansas State | W 68–57 | 13–5 (5–3) | 17 – Doucet | 13 – Doucet | 3 – Wheaton | Cajundome (356); Lafayette, LA |
| 02/10/2022; 7:00 p.m., ESPN+ | | at Texas State | L 71–72 ^{OT} | 13–6 (5–4) | 17 – Hallmon | 13 – Doucet | 2 – Johnson | Strahan Arena (1,109); San Marcos, TX |
| 02/12/2022; 2:00 p.m., ESPN+ | | at UT Arlington | W 62–57 | 14–6 (6–4) | 17 – Hallmon | 14 – Doucet | 3 – Rice | College Park Center (877); Arlington, TX |
| 02/19/2022; 2:00 p.m., ESPN+ | | at Louisiana–Monroe | W 73–53 | 15–6 (7–4) | 21 – Hallmon | 9 – Doucet | 6 – Rice | Fant–Ewing Coliseum; Monroe, LA |
| 02/24/2022; 6:00 p.m., ESPN+ | | Georgia State | W 64–48 | 16–6 (8–4) | 14 – Wheaton | 8 – Johnson | 2 – Hallmon | Cajundome (269); Lafayette, LA |
| 02/26/2022; 2:00 p.m., ESPN+ | | Georgia Southern | W 56–54 | 17–6 (9–4) | 16 – Johnson | 12 – Johnson | 3 – Johnson | Earl K. Long Gymnasium (169); Lafayette, LA |
Sun Belt Tournament
| 03/04/2022; 5:00 pm, ESPN+ | (3) | vs. (6) Texas State; Quarterfinals | W 71–46 | 18–6 | 19 – Hallmon | 6 – Doucet | 4 – Jones | Pensacola Bay Center (757); Pensacola, FL |
| 03/06/2022; 2:00 pm, ESPN+ | (3) | vs. (2) UT Arlington; Semifinals | L 65–75 | 18–7 | 24 – Wheaton | 7 – Doucet | 2 – Johnson | Pensacola Bay Center (944); Pensacola, FL |
*Non-conference game. ^{#}Rankings from AP Poll. (#) Tournament seedings in parentheses. All times are in Central Time.

== See also ==
- 2021–22 Louisiana Ragin' Cajuns men's basketball team
