= 2021–22 Troy Trojans women's basketball team =

Intercollegiate basketball season

2021–22 Troy Trojans women's basketball

Sun Belt Regular Season champions

WNIT, first round
- Conference: Sun Belt Conference
- Record: 24–9 (13–2 Sun Belt)
- Head coach: Chanda Rigby (10th season)
- Assistant coaches: Jennifer Graf; Courtney Simmons; Neil Harrow
- Home arena: Trojan Arena

2021–22 Sun Belt Conference women's basketball standings
	Conf.				Overall
Team	W		L	PCT	W		L	PCT
Troy	13	–	2	.867	24	–	9	.727
UT Arlington †	11	–	4	.733	20	–	8	.714
Louisiana	9	–	4	.692	18	–	7	.720
Appalachian State	8	–	4	.667	14	–	12	.538
Little Rock	8	–	4	.667	17	–	10	.630
Texas State	9	–	6	.600	15	–	14	.517
Georgia Southern	8	–	6	.571	18	–	10	.643
Arkansas State	5	–	9	.357	12	–	16	.429
Coastal Carolina	4	–	9	.308	15	–	11	.577
Georgia State	4	–	9	.308	10	–	16	.385
South Alabama	2	–	10	.167	8	–	18	.308
Louisiana–Monroe	0	–	14	.000	4	–	25	.138
† 2022 Sun Belt tournament winner

The 2021–22 Troy Trojans women's basketball team represented Troy University during the 2021–22 NCAA Division I women's basketball season. The basketball team, led by tenth-year head coach Chanda Rigby, played all home games at the Trojan Arena along with the Troy Trojans men's basketball team. They were members of the Sun Belt Conference.

As Conference champions for the second-consecutive year, the Trojans entered the Sun Belt Tournament as the No. 1 seed.

== Previous season ==
The Trojans finished the 2020–21 season 22–6, 15–2 in Sun Belt play to finish eastern divisional and conference tournament champions. They made it to the NCAA tournament for the first time since 2017 where they were defeated by second-seeded Texas A&M in a narrow margin of 84-80 in the first round.

== Roster ==
2021–22 Troy Trojans women's basketball team
Players
Coaches

Pos.	#	Name	Height	Year	Previous school	Hometown
G	0	Gabbi Cartagena	5 ft 8 in (1.73 m)	Fr	Jackson HS	Jackson, GA
F	1	Amber Leggett	5 ft 11 in (1.8 m)	Jr	Choctawhatchee HS; Sam Houston State	Navarre, FL
F	2	Felmas Koranga	6 ft 1 in (1.85 m)	Jr	Tyler JC	Nakuru, Kenya
G	4	Jasmine Robinson	5 ft 6 in (1.68 m)	Sr	Richmond County HS	Augusta, GA
G	5	Jada Walton	5 ft 11 in (1.8 m)	Jr	Southwest DeKalb HS; Texas Tech	Lithonia, GA
G	10	Janiah Sandifer	5 ft 7 in (1.7 m)	Sr	Pearl–Cohn HS	Nashville, TN
F	11	Ja'Mia Hollings	6 ft 2 in (1.88 m)	So	West Point HS; East Mississippi CC	West Point, MS
G	14	Tiyah Johnson	5 ft 10 in (1.78 m)	Sr	Central HS; Shelton State CC	Phenix City, AL
F	15	Tina Stephens	6 ft 2 in (1.88 m)	Sr	Palmetto HS; Florida SouthWestern State; Kansas	Palmetto, FL
G	20	Za'Nautica Downs	5 ft 9 in (1.75 m)	Jr	Colquitt County HS; Florida SouthWestern State; UNC-Wilmington	Moultrie, GA
F	21	Jhileiya Dunlap	6 ft 2 in (1.88 m)	Sr	Dreher HS; Ole Miss	Columbia, SC
G	22	Sharonica Hartsfield	5 ft 5 in (1.65 m)	Fr	Putnam City West HS	Oklahoma City, OK
G	23	Jelissa Reese	5 ft 9 in (1.75 m)	Fr	Americus Sumter HS	Cordele, GA

Head coach

- Chanda Rigby (Nova Southeastern)

Assistant coach(es)

- Jennifer Graf (Northwestern State)
- Courtney Simmons (Louisville)
- Neil Harrow (West–Scotland)

Legend

- (C) Team captain
- (S) Suspended
- (I) Ineligible
- (W) Walk-on
- Injured
- Current redshirt

Roster

== Schedule and results ==
Date time, TV	Rank^{#}	Opponent^{#}	Result	Record	High points	High rebounds	High assists	Site city, state
Non-conference Regular Season
11/09/2021*; 5:30 p.m.		Talladega College	W 101–81	1–0	32 – Leggett	13 – Koranga	4 – Hartsfield	Trojan Arena (2,784); Troy, AL
11/11/2021*; 6:00 p.m.		Florida A&M	W 79–50	2–0	17 – Leggett	8 – Koranga	9 – Robinson	Trojan Arena (2,579); Troy, AL
11/15/2021*; 7:00 p.m.		at Mercer	L 66–75	2–1	19 – Koranga	12 – Koranga	5 – Robinson	Hawkins Arena (833); Macon, GA
11/18/2021*; 6:00 p.m.		Bethune–Cookman	W 84–58	3–1	16 – Koranga	19 – Koranga	8 – Robinson	Trojan Arena (1,011); Troy, AL
11/23/2021*; 7:00 p.m.		at Missouri	L 63–76	3–2	19 – Johnson	9 – Harris	4 – Robinson	Mizzou Arena (2,353); Columbia, MO
11/28/2021*; 2:00 p.m.		at Duke	L 75–91	3–3	24 – Koranga	16 – Koranga	5 – Robinson	Cameron Indoor Stadium (2,516); Durham, NC
12/01/2021*; 5:30 p.m.		Samford	W 65–61	4–3	15 – Koranga	13 – Koranga	5 – Hartsfield	Trojan Arena (1,114); Troy, AL
12/04/2021*; 3:00 p.m.		at Wake Forest	L 61–90	4–4	22 – Leggett	11 – Leggett	2 – Robinson	Lawrence Joel Veterans Memorial Coliseum (524); Winston-Salem, NC
12/08/2021*; 6:00 p.m.		at Tulane	L 84–91	4–5	17 – Downs	7 – Koranga	8 – Hartsfield	Devlin Fieldhouse (646); New Orleans, LA
12/11/2021*; 4:00 p.m.		Middle Tennessee	W 77–76	5–5	13 – Koranga	9 – Koranga	6 – Hartsfield	Trojan Arena (877); Troy, AL
12/15/2021*; 6:00 p.m.		Alabama–Huntsville	W 107–57	6–5	29 – Leggett	10 – Leggett	9 – Robinson	Trojan Arena (976); Troy, AL
12/18/2021*; 2:00 p.m.		at Mississippi State; Mississippi State MTE	W 73–66	7–5	23 – Koranga	15 – Leggett	4 – Leggett	Humphrey Coliseum (4,561); Starkville, MS
12/19/2021*; 1:00 p.m.		vs. South Carolina State; Mississippi State MTE	W 94–51	8–5	19 – Leggett	12 – Hollings	5 – Robinson	Humphrey Coliseum (193); Starkville, MS
12/20/2021*; 12:00 p.m.		vs. Jackson State; Mississippi State MTE	W 99–82	9–5	22 – Koranga	17 – Koranga	5 – Hartsfield	Humphrey Coliseum (223); Starkville, MS
Conference regular season
12/30/2021; 6:00 p.m.		Coastal Carolina	W 91–80	10–5 (1–0)	17 – Leggett	15 – Leggett	4 – Robinson	Trojan Arena (1,049); Troy, AL
01/01/2022		Appalachian State	Game cancelled					Trojan Arena; Troy, AL
01/06/2022; 7:00 p.m.		at Texas State	W 96–73	11–5 (2–0)	25 – Johnson	10 – Leggett	7 – Robinson	Strahan Arena (693); San Marcos, TX
01/08/2022; 2:00 p.m.		at UT Arlington	W 59–48	12–5 (3–0)	19 – Dunlap	15 – Dunlap	4 – Robinson	College Park Center (1,246); Arlington, TX
01/13/2022; 6:00 p.m.		at Louisiana	L 83–92	12–6 (3–1)	25 – Koranga	14 – Dunlap	3 – Robinson	Cajundome (242); Lafayette, LA
01/15/2022; 2:00 p.m.		Louisiana–Monroe	W 89–57	13–6 (4–1)	13 – Stephens	14 – Koranga	4 – Stephens	Trojan Arena (1,781); Troy, AL
01/20/2022; 6:00 p.m.		Little Rock	L 66–68	13–7 (4–2)	16 – Robinson	9 – Koranga	4 – Robinson	Trojan Arena (1,801); Troy, AL
01/22/2022; 4:00 p.m.		Arkansas State	W 79–72	14–7 (5–2)	20 – Koranga	11 – Koranga	6 – Robinson	Trojan Arena (1,639); Troy, AL
01/27/2022; 6:00 p.m.		at Georgia Southern	W 78–72	15–7 (6–2)	16 – Robinson	11 – Koranga	4 – Robinson	Hanner Fieldhouse (408); Statesboro, GA
01/29/2022; 2:00 p.m.		at Georgia State	W 60–56	16–7 (7–2)	15 – Robinson	11 – Koranga	4 – Johnson	GSU Sports Arena (554); Atlanta, GA
02/05/2022; 4:00 p.m.		South Alabama	W 84–52	17–7 (8–2)	12 – Robinson	12 – Koranga	5 – Robinson	Trojan Arena (2,724); Troy, AL
02/12/2022; 3:00 p.m.		at South Alabama	W 80–60	18–7 (9–2)	14 – Downs	13 – Koranga	2 – Robinson	Mitchell Center; Mobile, AL
02/17/2022; 6:00 p.m.		Georgia State	W 67–56	19–7 (10–2)	15 – Leggett	13 – Koranga	4 – Robinson	Trojan Arena (1,246); Troy, AL
02/19/2022; 4:00 p.m.		Georgia Southern	W 82–70	20–7 (11–2)	14 – Stephens	24 – Koranga	4 – Robinson	Trojan Arena (1,455); Troy, AL
02/24/2022; 6:00 p.m.		at Appalachian State	W 89–56	21–7 (12–2)	18 – Koranga	13 – Koranga	3 – Downs	George M. Holmes Convocation Center (309); Boone, NC
02/26/2022; 2:00 p.m.		at Coastal Carolina	W 71–58	22–7 (13–2)	13 – Koranga	12 – Koranga	4 – Leggett	HTC Center (337); Conway, SC
Sun Belt Tournament
03/04/2022; 11:30 am, ESPN+	(1)	vs. (9) Coastal Carolina; Quarterfinals	W 99–77	23–7	20 – Dunlap	12 – Koranga	6 – Sandifer	Pensacola Bay Center (724); Pensacola, FL
03/06/2022; 11:30 am, ESPN+	(1)	vs. (5) Little Rock; Semifinals	W 62–59	24–7	18 – Dunlap	10 – Stephens	3 – Stephens	Pensacola Bay Center (679); Pensacola, FL
03/07/2022; 1:00 pm, ESPNU	(1)	vs. (2) UT Arlington; Championship	L 61–76	24–8	13 – Koranga	14 – Stephens	3 – Hartsfield	Pensacola Bay Center (904); Pensacola, FL
WNIT
03/17/2022; 6:00 pm, ESPN3		Alabama; First Round	L 79–82	24–9	13 – Tied	12 – Koranga	5 – Robinson	Trojan Arena (2,262); Troy, AL
*Non-conference game. ^{#}Rankings from AP Poll. (#) Tournament seedings in parentheses. All times are in Central Time.

== See also ==
- 2021–22 Troy Trojans men's basketball team
