= 2021–22 South Alabama Jaguars women's basketball team =

Intercollegiate basketball season

2021–22 South Alabama Jaguars women's basketball
- Conference: Sun Belt Conference
- Record: 8–18 (2–10 Sun Belt)
- Head coach: Terry Fowler (8th season)
- Assistant coaches: Dan Presel; Rachel Travis; Mansa El
- Home arena: Mitchell Center

2021–22 Sun Belt Conference women's basketball standings
	Conf.				Overall
Team	W		L	PCT	W		L	PCT
Troy	13	–	2	.867	24	–	9	.727
UT Arlington †	11	–	4	.733	20	–	8	.714
Louisiana	9	–	4	.692	18	–	7	.720
Appalachian State	8	–	4	.667	14	–	12	.538
Little Rock	8	–	4	.667	17	–	10	.630
Texas State	9	–	6	.600	15	–	14	.517
Georgia Southern	8	–	6	.571	18	–	10	.643
Arkansas State	5	–	9	.357	12	–	16	.429
Coastal Carolina	4	–	9	.308	15	–	11	.577
Georgia State	4	–	9	.308	10	–	16	.385
South Alabama	2	–	10	.167	8	–	18	.308
Louisiana–Monroe	0	–	14	.000	4	–	25	.138
† 2022 Sun Belt tournament winner

The 2021–22 South Alabama Jaguars women's basketball team represented the University of South Alabama during the 2021–22 NCAA Division I women's basketball season. The basketball team, led by eighth-year head coach Terry Fowler, played all home games at the Mitchell Center along with the South Alabama Jaguars men's basketball team. They were members of the Sun Belt Conference.

== Roster ==
2021–22 South Alabama Jaguars women's basketball team
Players
Coaches

Pos.	#	Name	Height	Year	Previous school	Hometown
G	0	Tyrielle Williams	5 ft 7 in (1.7 m)	Fr	Ursuline Academy	New Orleans, Louisiana
C	1	Zena Ellis	6 ft 3 in (1.91 m)	Sr	Countryside HS; Buffalo	Clearwater, Florida
G	3	Dee Haymer	5 ft 8 in (1.73 m)	Sr	Holmes County Central HS; Cincinnati	Tchula, Mississippi
G	4	Mahogany Vaught	5 ft 6 in (1.68 m)	Sr	Olive Branch HS	Olive Branch, Mississippi
G	10	Janelle Jones	5 ft 9 in (1.75 m)	So	B. T. Washington HS	Pensacola, Florida
G	11	Nadia Howard	5 ft 8 in (1.73 m)	Fr	Grayson HS	Grayson, Georgia
F	13	Jaylin Powell	5 ft 10 in (1.78 m)	Sr	Rolesville HS; Elon	Raleigh, North Carolina
F	14	Kiana Anderson	6 ft 1 in (1.85 m)	Jr	Warren Easton Charter HS; Trinity Valley CC	New Orleans, Louisiana
G	15	Trinity Garrett	5 ft 6 in (1.68 m)	Fr	Smithson Valley HS	San Antonio, Texas
F	21	Casey Ferguson	5 ft 11 in (1.8 m)	RS Sr	D'Iberville HS	Biloxi, Mississippi
F	23	Destiny Samuel	6 ft 2 in (1.88 m)	RS Jr	Baldwin HS; Binghamton, NY	Queens, New York
G	24	Jordan Rosier	5 ft 9 in (1.75 m)	Fr	Florida State University HS	Tallahassee, Florida
F	30	Emani Burks	6 ft 2 in (1.88 m)	Fr	Palm Bay Magnet HS	Melbourne, Florida
C	33	Debbie Reese	6 ft 1 in (1.85 m)	Fr	Lincoln Park Academy	Fort Pierce, Florida

Head coach

- Terry Fowler (Lane College)

Assistant coach(es)

- Dan Presel (Spring Hill)
- Rachel Travis (Northwest)
- Mansa El (Houston)

Legend

- (C) Team captain
- (S) Suspended
- (I) Ineligible
- (W) Walk-on
- Injured
- Current redshirt

Roster
Last update: 23 December 2022

== Schedule and results ==
Date time, TV	Rank^{#}	Opponent^{#}	Result	Record	High points	High rebounds	High assists	Site city, state
Exhibition
11/01/2021*; 7:00 p.m.		Spring Hill	W 85–49		17 – Elias	8 – Elias	5 – Williams	Mitchell Center (313); Mobile, AL
Non-conference Regular Season
11/09/2021*; 3:00 p.m.		Mobile	W 63–59	1–0	14 – Vaught	13 – Elias	4 – Vaught	Mitchell Center (221); Mobile, AL
11/12/2021*; 7:00 p.m.		at Rutgers	L 45–64	1–1	13 – Powell	6 – Elias	5 – Williams	Jersey Mike's Arena (853); Piscataway, NJ
12/15/2021*; 7:00 p.m.		Auburn-Montgomery	W 70–49	2–1	16 – Vaught	5 – Anderson	4 – Howard	Mitchell Center (237); Mobile, AL
12/20/2021*; 4:00 p.m.		at Tulane	L 53–86	2–2	12 – Powell	5 – Vaught	3 – Williams	Devlin Fieldhouse (556); New Orleans, LA
11/23/2021*; 7:00 p.m.		New Orleans	W 63–53	3–2	22 – Powell	9 – Powell	2 – Tied	Mitchell Center (206); Mobile, AL
11/26/2021*; 11:00 a.m.		Mercer	L 53–67	3–3	15 – Haymer	9 – Haymer	5 – Vaught	Mitchell Center (145); Mobile, AL
11/28/2021*; 1:00 p.m.		at Alabama State	L 59–69	3–4	9 – Tied	8 – Samuel	3 – Williams	Dunn–Oliver Acadome (250); Montgomery, AL
12/05/2021*; 3:00 p.m.		Southern Miss	L 51–71	3–5	10 – Samuel	7 – Tied	3 – Haymer	Mitchell Center (313); Mobile, AL
12/11/2021*; 12:00 p.m.		at Nicholls	W 73–63	4–5	23 – Howard	8 – Powell	3 – Vaught	Stopher Gymnasium (214); Thibodaux, LA
12/14/2021*; 3:00 p.m.		Faulkner	W 91–51	5–5	23 – Rosier	6 – Powell	7 – Vaught	Mitchell Center (188); Mobile, AL
12/18/2021*; 12:00 p.m.		vs. Charleston Southern; Georgia State Classic	W 52–51	6–5	10 – Powell	5 – Tied	2 – Tied	GSU Sports Arena (353); Atlanta, GA
12/19/2021*; 12:00 p.m.		vs. Tulsa; Georgia State Classic	L 62–92	6–6	14 – Howard	7 – Vaught	2 – Tied	GSU Sports Arena (360); Atlanta, GA
12/21/2021*; 12:00 p.m.		at No. 13 Georgia	L 50–89	6–7	11 – Vaught	4 – Tied	2 – Tied	Stegeman Coliseum (2,082); Athens, GA
Conference Regular Season
12/30/2021		Appalachian State	Postponed					Mitchell Center; Mobile, AL
01/01/2022		Coastal Carolina	Postponed					Mitchell Center; Mobile, AL
01/06/2022		at UT Arlington	Postponed					College Park Center; Arlington, TX
01/08/2022		at Texas State	Postponed					Strahan Arena; San Marcos, TX
01/13/2022; 6:30 p.m.		at Louisiana–Monroe	W 69–54	7–7 (1–0)	20 – Powell	7 – Tied	7 – Vaught	Fant–Ewing Coliseum (237); Monroe, LA
01/15/2022; 2:00 p.m.		Louisiana	L 64–71	7–8 (1–1)	23 – Powell	12 – Powell	4 – Tied	Mitchell Center; Mobile, AL
01/20/2022; 7:00 p.m.		Arkansas State	W 73–65	8–8 (2–1)	22 – Vaught	7 – Tied	5 – Williams	Mitchell Center (275); Mobile, AL
01/22/2022; 3:00 p.m.		Little Rock	L 52–74	8–9 (2–2)	11 – Howard	9 – Anderson	2 – Tied	Mitchell Center (315); Mobile, AL
01/27/2022; 6:00 p.m.		at Georgia State	L 66–72	8–10 (2–3)	17 – Powell	11 – Vaught	4 – Vaught	GSU Sports Arena (431); Atlanta, GA
01/29/2022; 2:00 p.m.		at Georgia Southern	L 69–77	8–11 (2–4)	17 – Powell	6 – Vaught	4 – Williams	Hanner Fieldhouse (507); Statesboro, GA
02/05/2022; 4:00 p.m.		at Troy	L 52–84	8–12 (2–5)	10 – Vaught	9 – Jones	4 – Tied	Trojan Arena (2,724); Troy, AL
02/12/2022; 3:00 p.m.		Troy	L 60–80	8–13 (2–6)	20 – Powell	8 – Samuel	6 – Vaught	Mitchell Center; Mobile, AL
02/17/2022; 7:00 p.m.		Georgia Southern	L 56–68	8–14 (2–7)	15 – Ferguson	5 – Tied	5 – Haymer	Mitchell Center (258); Mobile, AL
02/19/2022; 3:00 p.m.		Georgia State	L 57–60	8–15 (2–8)	22 – Powell	8 – Powell	6 – Vaught	Mitchell Center (379); Mobile, AL
02/24/2022; 6:00 p.m.		at Coastal Carolina	L 62–79	8–16 (2–9)	14 – Tied	5 – Anderson	5 – Vaught	HTC Center (320); Conway, SC
02/26/2022; 2:00 p.m.		at Appalachian State	L 50–72	8–17 (2–10)	18 – Haymer	7 – Haymer	5 – Vaught	Holmes Center (461); Boone, NC
Sun Belt Tournament
03/02/2022; 5:00 p.m., ESPN+	(11)	vs. (6) Texas State; First Round	L 66–80	8–18	19 – Powell	5 – Powell	4 – Vaught	Pensacola Bay Center (667); Pensacola, FL
*Non-conference game. ^{#}Rankings from AP Poll. (#) Tournament seedings in parentheses. All times are in Central Time.

== See also ==
- 2021–22 South Alabama Jaguars men's basketball team
