= Zenarae Antoine =

American college basketball coach (born 1975)

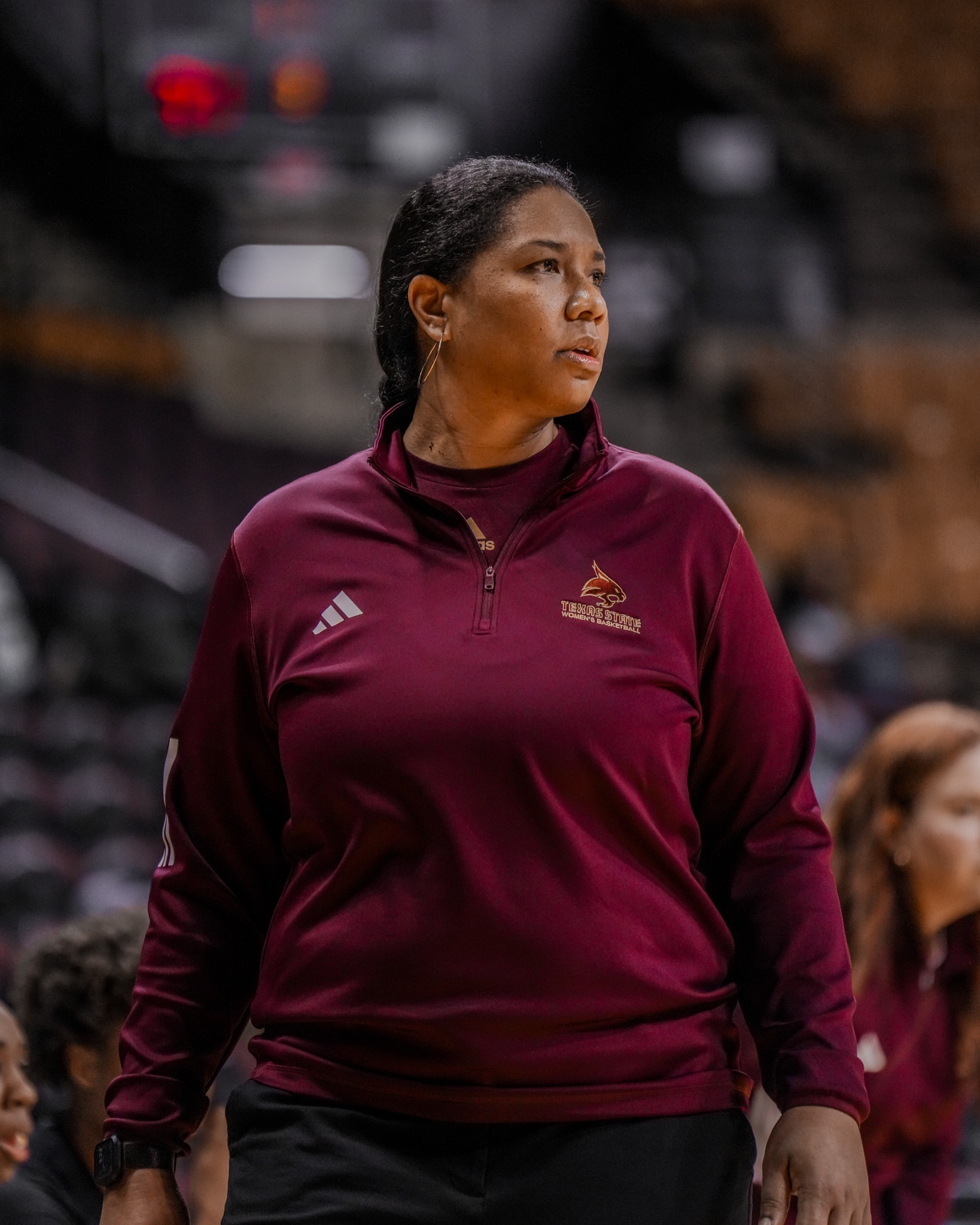

Biographical details
- Born: January 31, 1975 (age 51); Salina, Kansas, U.S.

Playing career
- 1994–1998: Colorado State
- Position: Forward

Coaching career (HC unless noted)
- 1999–2000: Ohio (GA)
- 2000–2001: College of Charleston (asst.)
- 2001–2003: Ohio (asst.)
- 2003–2007: Louisville (asst.)
- 2007–2011: Arkansas (asst.)
- 2011–2026: Texas State

Head coaching record
- Overall: 225–226 (.499)
- Tournaments: WNIT: 0–1; WBI: 0–3

Accomplishments and honors

Championships
- 2022-2023 Sun Belt Regular Season Champions

Zenarae Tshui Chu Antoine (née Pieters; born January 31, 1975) is an American college basketball coach who is the current head coach of the women's basketball team at Texas State University in San Marcos, Texas.

Zenarae Antoine is in her fifteenth season as the head coach at Texas State and is the winningest coach in program history. In her first season, she led one of the best turnarounds in school history, taking a 9–20 team the year before, to 17–14 including the school's first conference tournament win since 2003. She has also led the team appearances in the Women's Basketball Invitational (WBI) in 2014, 2015 and 2017. Coach Antoine led the Bobcats to the 2022–23 Sun Belt regular season championship.

== Early life and education ==
Zenarae Antoine was born Zenarae Tshui Chu Pieters in Salina, Kansas and raised in Katy, Texas. Her father was an immigrant from British Guyana, and her mother is Chinese.

Antoine graduated from James E. Taylor High School in Katy. After high school, Antoine attended Colorado State University and played basketball for the Colorado State Rams from 1994 to 1998 while completing her degree in physical science with minors in geology and statistics. In 2000, Antoine received her master's degree in athletic administration at Ohio University; she also was a graduate assistant for Ohio Bobcats women's basketball in the 1999–2000 season.

== Coaching career ==
In the 1998–99 season, Antoine was an AAU coach and semi-professional basketball player for the Southeast Ravens team in Houston.

Antoine's first full-time assistant position was in the 2000–01 season with the College of Charleston as Zenarae Pieters. Returning to Ohio University, Antoine was an assistant coach there from 2001 to 2003 going by Zena Pieters.

Now going by her married name, Antoine joined the staff of new head coach Tom Collen at Louisville as recruiting coordinator on June 24, 2003. As the lead recruiter, Antoine put together two nationally ranked recruiting classes in her last two seasons, no. 26 in 2006 and no. 25 in 2007. Antoine then followed Collen to Arkansas in 2007 and served four years under Collen as assistant coach.

=== Texas State (2011–present) ===
On April 18, 2011, Texas State hired Antoine as women's basketball head coach. Inheriting a team that went 9–20 in 2010–11, Antoine led Texas State to a 17–14 record in its final year in the Southland Conference. Texas State moved to the Western Athletic Conference for the 2012–13 season, during which the team went 10–20 yet won its first game against a Big 12 Conference opponent since 2005, 91–80 against TCU at home.

Beginning in the 2013–14 season, Texas State became a member of the Sun Belt Conference and made its first postseason appearance since 2008 in the WBI. Texas State made the WBI again in 2015 and 2017.

== Head coaching record ==
Record table
Season	Team	Overall	Conference	Standing	Postseason
Texas State Bobcats (Southland Conference) (2011–2012)
2011–12	Texas State	17–14	8–8	T–5th	
Texas State Bobcats (Western Athletic Conference) (2012–2013)
2012–13	Texas State	10–20	4–14	T–9th	
Texas State Bobcats (Sun Belt Conference) (2013–2026)
2013–14	Texas State	16–16	12–6	T–3rd	WBI First Round
2014–15	Texas State	17–15	11–9	T–4th	WBI First Round
2015–16	Texas State	12–19	7–13	T–7th	
2016–17	Texas State	16–15	11–7	T–4th	WBI First Round
2017–18	Texas State	23–10	14–4	2nd	WNIT First Round
2018–19	Texas State	14–17	9–9	6th	
2019–20	Texas State	13–17	6–12	10th	
2020–21	Texas State	11–11	7–8	4th (West)	
2021–22	Texas State	15–14	9–6	6th	
2022–23	Texas State	23–10	13–5	T–1st	WNIT First round
2023–24	Texas State	14–18	4–14	T–12th	
2024–25	Texas State	13–17	7–11	T–9th	
2025–26	Texas State	11–19	7–11	T–8th	
Texas State:		225–232 (.492)	129–137 (.485)		
Total:		225–232 (.492)			
National champion Postseason invitational champion Conference regular season champion Conference regular season and conference tournament champion Division regular season champion Division regular season and conference tournament champion Conference tournament champion

== Personal life ==
Since 2000, Zenarae Antoine has been married to football coach Ron Antoine, who is currently the Offensive Coordinator and teacher at Johnson High School in Buda, TX. They have three sons.
