= 2021–22 Texas State Bobcats women's basketball team =

Intercollegiate basketball season

2021–22 Texas State Bobcats women's basketball
- Conference: Sun Belt Conference
- Record: 15–14 (9–6 Sun Belt)
- Head coach: Zenarae Antoine (11th season)
- Assistant coaches: Nathan Teymer; Jericka Jenkins; Paige Love
- Home arena: Strahan Arena

2021–22 Sun Belt Conference women's basketball standings
	Conf.				Overall
Team	W		L	PCT	W		L	PCT
Troy	13	–	2	.867	24	–	9	.727
UT Arlington †	11	–	4	.733	20	–	8	.714
Louisiana	9	–	4	.692	18	–	7	.720
Appalachian State	8	–	4	.667	14	–	12	.538
Little Rock	8	–	4	.667	17	–	10	.630
Texas State	9	–	6	.600	15	–	14	.517
Georgia Southern	8	–	6	.571	18	–	10	.643
Arkansas State	5	–	9	.357	12	–	16	.429
Coastal Carolina	4	–	9	.308	15	–	11	.577
Georgia State	4	–	9	.308	10	–	16	.385
South Alabama	2	–	10	.167	8	–	18	.308
Louisiana–Monroe	0	–	14	.000	4	–	25	.138
† 2022 Sun Belt tournament winner

The 2021–22 Texas State Bobcats women's basketball team represented Texas State University during the 2021–22 NCAA Division I women's basketball season. The basketball team, led by eleventh-year head coach Zenarae Antoine, played all home games at the Strahan Arena in San Marcos, Texas, along with the Texas State Bobcats men's basketball team. They were members of the Sun Belt Conference.

== Roster ==
2021–22 Texas State Bobcats women's basketball team
Players
Coaches

Pos.	#	Name	Height	Year	Previous school	Hometown
PG	0	Raven Adams	5 ft 5 in (1.65 m)	Fr	Ridge Point HS	Missouri City, TX
G	2	Presley Bennett	5 ft 7 in (1.7 m)	So	Westlake HS	Austin, TX
G	3	Kennedy Taylor	5 ft 3 in (1.6 m)	Sr	Lincoln HS	Dallas, TX
G	4	Sierra Dickson	5 ft 7 in (1.7 m)	So	Hebron HS	Carrollton, TX
G	5	Jo'Nah Johnson	5 ft 9 in (1.75 m)	Sr	Edmond Sante Fe HS; Texas Tech	Edmond, OK
G	11	Sierra Brooks	5 ft 8 in (1.73 m)	Fr	Harker Heights HS	Killeen, TX
G	15	Ja'Kayla Bowie	5 ft 8 in (1.73 m)	Sr	Robert E. Lee HS	Tyler, TX
F	20	Chelsea Johnson	6 ft 1 in (1.85 m)	Jr	Loyola College Prep	Shreveport, LA
G	23	Tianna Eaton	5 ft 10 in (1.78 m)	RS Sr	Rowland HS; UC Riverside	Walnut, CA
F	25	Lauryn Thompson	6 ft 1 in (1.85 m)	RS Jr	Mansfield Timberview HS; VCU	Arlington, TX
F	32	Da'Nasia Hood	6 ft 1 in (1.85 m)	Sr	Karen Wagner HS	San Antonio, TX
G	33	Gabby Standifer	5 ft 11 in (1.8 m)	Sr	Argyle HS; Fresno State	The Colony, TX
F	40	Nicole Leff	6 ft 1 in (1.85 m)	So	Cedar Park HS	Cedar Park, TX
C	55	Jaeda Reed	6 ft 1 in (1.85 m)	Sr	Eisenhower HS	Lawton, OK

Head coach

- Zenarae Antoine (Ohio)

Assistant coach(es)

- Nathan Teymer (Georgia Southwestern State)
- Jericka Jenkins (Texas State)
- Paige Love (Texas State)

Legend

- (C) Team captain
- (S) Suspended
- (I) Ineligible
- (W) Walk-on
- Injured
- Current redshirt

Roster
Last update: November 7, 2024

== Schedule and results ==
Date time, TV	Rank^{#}	Opponent^{#}	Result	Record	High points	High rebounds	High assists	Site city, state
Non-conference regular season
November 9, 2021*; 7:00 p.m.		at No. 7 Baylor	L 70–77	0–1	20 – Hood	8 – Bowie	9 – Taylor	Ferrell Center (4,180); Waco, TX
November 14, 2021*; 2:00 p.m.		Huston–Tillotson	W 82–48	1–1	13 – tied	8 – Hood	7 – Taylor	Strahan Arena (756); San Marcos, TX
November 18, 2021*; 7:00 p.m.		at UTSA	W 76–62	2–1	15 – Taylor	7 – Thompson	8 – Taylor	Convocation Center (608); San Antonio, TX
November 22, 2021*; 7:00 p.m.		at Texas Tech	L 57–83	2–2	14 – Hood	8 – Reed	7 – Taylor	United Supermarkets Arena (4,066); Lubbock, TX
November 29, 2021*; 7:00 p.m.		Arlington Baptist	W 93–23	3–2	21 – Hood	13 – Hood	7 – N. Johnson	Strahan Arena (820); San Marcos, TX
December 2, 2021*; 6:00 p.m.		at Houston Baptist	W 58–54	4–2	14 – Thompson	8 – Hood	9 – Taylor	Sharp Gymnasium (276); Houston, TX
December 5, 2021*; 3:00 p.m.		Texas College	W 105–37	5–2	21 – Eaton	8 – Dickson	7 – Adams	Strahan Arena (1,381); San Marcos, TX
December 10, 2021*; 7:00 p.m.		at Lamar	L 59–63	5–3	18 – Taylor	7 – Hood	2 – tied	Montagne Center (728); Beaumont, TX
December 13, 2021*; 7:00 p.m.		UTEP	L 57–69	5–4	19 – Reed	9 – Bowie	3 – tied	Strahan Arena (758); San Marcos, TX
December 16, 2021*; 1:00 p.m.		Dartmouth	L 39–62	5–5	8 – Standifer	6 – Taylor	8 – Taylor	Strahan Arena (607); San Marcos, TX
December 18, 2021*; 2:00 p.m.		at Loyola Marymount	L 68–77	5–6	15 – Taylor	9 – Thompson	4 – tied	Gersten Pavilion; Los Angeles, CA
December 21, 2021*; 2:00 p.m.		at San Diego	L 58–78	5–7	13 – tied	8 – Reed	2 – tied	Jenny Craig Pavilion (157); San Diego, CA
Conference regular season
December 30, 2021; 6:30 p.m.		at Louisiana–Monroe	W 58–50	6–7 (1–0)	19 – Hood	9 – Hood	8 – Taylor	Fant–Ewing Coliseum (203); Monroe, LA
January 1, 2022; 2:00 p.m.		at Louisiana	L 72–78	6–8 (1–1)	20 – tied	9 – Hood	9 – Taylor	Cajundome (252); Lafayette, LA
January 6, 2022; 7:00 p.m.		Troy	L 73–96	6–9 (1–2)	21 – Hood	10 – tied	5 – Taylor	Strahan Arena (693); San Marcos, TX
January 8, 2022		South Alabama	Postponed					Strahan Arena; San Marcos, TX
January 13, 2022; 6:00 p.m.		at Georgia Southern	W 78–74	7–9 (2–2)	32 – Hood	7 – Thompson	7 – J. Johnson	Hanner Fieldhouse (456); Statesboro, GA
January 15, 2022; 2:00 p.m.		at Georgia State	W 73–55	8–9 (3–2)	26 – Hood	14 – Hood	10 – Taylor	GSU Sports Arena (427); Atlanta, GA
January 20, 2022; 7:00 p.m.		at UT Arlington	L 67–69	8–10 (3–3)	22 – Hood	12 – Hood	5 – Taylor	College Park Center (1,077); Arlington, TX
January 22, 2022; 2:00 p.m.		UT Arlington	L 65–72	8–11 (3–4)	21 – Hood	15 – Hood	12 – Taylor	Strahan Arena (1,057); San Marcos, TX
January 27, 2022; 11:30 a.m.		at Little Rock	W 69–65 ^{3OT}	9–11 (4–4)	30 – Hood	11 – Hood	10 – Taylor	Jack Stephens Center (1,665); Little Rock, AR
January 29, 2022; 1:00 p.m.		at Arkansas State	W 75–69	10–11 (5–4)	19 – Bowie	11 – Bowie	5 – tied	First National Bank Arena (515); Jonesboro, AR
February 5, 2022; 2:00 p.m.		Coastal Carolina	W 64–59	11–11 (6–4)	15 – J. Johnson	10 – Thompson	7 – Taylor	Strahan Arena (2,638); San Marcos, TX
February 10, 2022; 7:00 p.m.		Louisiana; Play4Kay Cancer Awareness Weekend	W 72–71 ^{OT}	12–11 (7–4)	27 – Hood	10 – Hood	8 – Taylor	Strahan Arena (1,019); San Marcos, TX
February 12, 2022; 2:00 p.m.		Louisiana–Monroe; Play4Kay Cancer Awareness Weekend	W 66–58	13–11 (8–4)	16 – tied	6 – tied	8 – Taylor	Strahan Arena (962); San Marcos, TX
February 19, 2022; 2:00 p.m.		at Appalachian State	L 55–73	13–12 (8–5)	13 – Eaton	8 – Hood	7 – Taylor	Holmes Center (1,525); Boone, NC
February 24, 2022; 7:00 p.m.		Arkansas State	W 84–75	14–12 (9–5)	25 – Hood	9 – Thompson	5 – Taylor	Strahan Arena (718); San Marcos, TX
February 26, 2022; 2:00 p.m.		Little Rock	L 53–70	14–13 (9–6)	14 – J. Johnson	8 – Hood	3 – Taylor	Strahan Arena (843); San Marcos, TX
Sun Belt tournament
March 2, 2022; 5:00 p.m., ESPN+	(6)	vs. (11) South Alabama; First round	W 80–66	15–13	33 – Hood	13 – Hood	8 – Taylor	Pensacola Bay Center (667); Pensacola, FL
March 4, 2022; 5:00 p.m.	(6)	vs. (3) Louisiana; Quarterfinals	L 46–71	15–14	12 – Taylor	5 – Hood	3 – Taylor	Pensacola Bay Center (757); Pensacola, FL
*Non-conference game. ^{#}Rankings from AP poll. (#) Tournament seedings in parentheses. All times are in Central.

== See also ==
- 2021–22 Texas State Bobcats men's basketball team
