= 2021–22 Louisiana–Monroe Warhawks women's basketball team =

Intercollegiate basketball season

2021–22 Louisiana–Monroe Warhawks women's basketball
- Conference: Sun Belt Conference
- Record: 4–25 (0–14 Sun Belt)
- Head coach: Brooks Donald-Williams (2nd season)
- Assistant coaches: Christie Sides; Jessica Barber; Jayln Johnson
- Home arena: Fant–Ewing Coliseum

2021–22 Sun Belt Conference women's basketball standings
	Conf.				Overall
Team	W		L	PCT	W		L	PCT
Troy	13	–	2	.867	24	–	9	.727
UT Arlington †	11	–	4	.733	20	–	8	.714
Louisiana	9	–	4	.692	18	–	7	.720
Appalachian State	8	–	4	.667	14	–	12	.538
Little Rock	8	–	4	.667	17	–	10	.630
Texas State	9	–	6	.600	15	–	14	.517
Georgia Southern	8	–	6	.571	18	–	10	.643
Arkansas State	5	–	9	.357	12	–	16	.429
Coastal Carolina	4	–	9	.308	15	–	11	.577
Georgia State	4	–	9	.308	10	–	16	.385
South Alabama	2	–	10	.167	8	–	18	.308
Louisiana–Monroe	0	–	14	.000	4	–	25	.138
† 2022 Sun Belt tournament winner As of March 19, 2022; Rankings from AP poll

The 2021–22 Louisiana–Monroe Warhawks women's basketball team represented the University of Louisiana at Monroe during the 2021–22 NCAA Division I women's basketball season. The basketball team, led by second-year head coach Brooks Donald-Williams, played all home games at the Fant–Ewing Coliseum along with the Louisiana–Monroe Warhawks men's basketball team. They were members of the Sun Belt Conference.

== Roster ==
2021–22 Louisiana–Monroe Warhawks women's basketball team
Players
Coaches

Pos.	#	Name	Height	Year	Previous school	Hometown
G	0	Kyren Washington	5 ft 9 in (1.75 m)	Fr	Northlake Christian	Folsom, Louisiana
G	1	Bre Sutton	5 ft 9 in (1.75 m)	Fr	Warren Easton Charter HS	New Orleans, Louisiana
G	2	Gara Beth Self	5 ft 8 in (1.73 m)	So	Ingomar HS	New Albany, Mississippi
G	3	Linda van Schaik	5 ft 10 in (1.78 m)	So	Orange Angels	South Holland, Netherlands
F	4	Kierra Crockett	6 ft 0 in (1.83 m)	Sr	North Farmington HS; Independence CC	Farmington Hills, Michigan
G	10	Aasia Sam	5 ft 11 in (1.8 m)	Fr	LaGrange HS	Lake Charles, Louisiana
F	11	Victoria Woods	6 ft 1 in (1.85 m)	Fr	Elton HS	Elton, Louisiana
G	13	Gracen Williams	5 ft 7 in (1.7 m)	Fr	Homeschool of Dallas	McKinney, Texas
G	14	Jada Anderson	5 ft 5 in (1.65 m)	Fr	Benton HS	Benton, Louisiana
G	15	Amaya Ford	5 ft 11 in (1.8 m)	Fr	Starkville HS	Starkville, Mississippi
G	20	Chloe Wilbanks	5 ft 6 in (1.68 m)	Fr	Hicks HS	Hicks, Louisiana
G	21	Katlyn Manuel	6 ft 1 in (1.85 m)	Fr	Northwest HS	Lawtell, Louisiana
G	22	Qua Chambers	5 ft 8 in (1.73 m)	Fr	Benton HS	Plain Dealing, Louisiana
G	23	Tasionna McDowell	6 ft 1 in (1.85 m)	Fr	Delhi HS	Delhi, Louisiana
C	24	Diamond Brooks	6 ft 2 in (1.88 m)	Sr	Jewel M. Sumner HS	Kentwood, Louisiana
G	25	Kierra Brimzy	5 ft 9 in (1.75 m)	RS Jr	Natchitoches Central HS; Tyler JC	Natchitoches, Louisiana
C	42	Hannah Edwards	6 ft 6 in (1.98 m)	Fr	Oak Mountain HS	Birmingham, Alabama

Head coach

- Brooks Donald-Williams (Mississippi State)

Assistant coach(es)

- Christie Sides (Louisiana Tech)
- Jessica Barber (Mobile)
- Jayln Johnson (McNeese State)

Legend

- (C) Team captain
- (S) Suspended
- (I) Ineligible
- (W) Walk-on
- Injured
- Current redshirt

Roster
Last update: 23 December 2022

== Schedule and results ==
Date time, TV	Rank^{#}	Opponent^{#}	Result	Record	High points	High rebounds	High assists	Site city, state
Exhibition
11/01/2021*; 6:30 p.m.		Millsaps	W 95–40		16 – Tied	7 – Tied	4 – van Schaik	Fant–Ewing Coliseum (141); Monroe, LA
Non-conference Regular Season
11/09/2021*; 6:00 p.m.		at Grambling State	L 61–69	0–1	16 – Whittington	7 – Williams	3 – Whittington	Fredrick C. Hobdy Assembly Center (1,309); Grambling, LA
11/13/2021*; 2:00 p.m.		at Southern Miss	L 60–77	0–2	17 – Whittington	10 – Ford	2 – Tied	Reed Green Coliseum (1,607); Hattiesburg, MS
11/16/2021*; 11:30 a.m., ESPN+		Louisiana Christian	W 71–58	1–2	15 – Williams	11 – van Schaik	4 – Williams	Fant–Ewing Coliseum (2,408); Monroe, LA
11/20/2021*; 1:00 p.m.		at Central Arkansas	L 41–62	1–3	13 – Whittington	5 – Manuel	2 – McDowell	Farris Center (317); Conway, SC
11/22/2021*; 6:30 p.m., ESPN+		Centenary	W 70–36	2–3	13 – Self	7 – Manuel	4 – Williams	Fant–Ewing Coliseum (476); Monroe, LA
11/26/2021*; 1:30 p.m.		vs. Stetson; Van Chancellor Classic	L 37–70	2–4	16 – Whittington	8 – Crockett	3 – Williams	Merrell Center; Katy, TX
11/27/2021*; 6:30 p.m.		vs. New Mexico; Van Chancellor Classic	L 45–66	2–5	8 – Tied	11 – McDowell	2 – Tied	Merrell Center; Katy, TX
11/28/2021*; 6:30 p.m.		vs. Stephen F. Austin; Van Chancellor Classic	L 53–80	2–6	14 – Crockett	10 – Woods	5 – Sutton	Merrell Center; Katy, TX
12/02/2021*; 6:30 p.m., ESPN+		Louisiana Tech	L 48–64	2–7	16 – Whittington	7 – Crockett	4 – Sutton	Fant–Ewing Coliseum (915); Monroe, LA
12/04/2021*; 4:30 p.m., ESPN+		Alcorn State	W 74–60	3–7	18 – Self	10 – Manuel	4 – Sutton	Fant–Ewing Coliseum (1,321); Monroe, LA
12/08/2021*; 2:00 p.m., ESPN+		Champion Christian	W 65–51	4–7	16 – Self	13 – Manuel	4 – Tied	Fant–Ewing Coliseum (267); Monroe, LA
12/15/2021*; 6:30 p.m., ESPN+		Northwestern State	L 72–76	4–8	15 – Tied	10 – Crockett	5 – Sutton	Fant–Ewing Coliseum (805); Monroe, LA
12/18/2021*; 12:00 p.m., ESPN+		McNeese State	L 54–81	4–9	14 – van Schaik	6 – Tied	2 – Tied	Fant–Ewing Coliseum; Monroe, LA
12/20/2021*; 2:00 p.m., ESPN+		Mississippi Valley State	L 72–73 ^{OT}	4–10	21 – van Schaik	16 – van Schaik	8 – Sutton	Fant–Ewing Coliseum (287); Monroe, LA
Conference Regular Season
12/30/2021; 6:30 p.m., ESPN+		Texas State	L 50–58	4–11 (0–1)	16 – Whittington	9 – Manuel	6 – Whittington	Fant–Ewing Coliseum (203); Monroe, LA
01/01/2022; 2:00 p.m., ESPN+		UT Arlington	L 56–72	4–12 (0–2)	18 – Whittington	8 – Manuel	2 – Tied	Fant–Ewing Coliseum (102); Monroe, LA
01/06/2022; 6:30 p.m., ESPN+		at Little Rock	Postponed					Jack Stephens Center; Little Rock, AR
01/08/2022; 1:00 p.m., ESPN+		at Arkansas State	L 70–98	4–13 (0–3)	15 – Sutton	8 – Manuel	4 – Whittington	First National Bank Arena (413); Jonesboro, AR
01/13/2022; 6:30 p.m., ESPN+		South Alabama	L 54–69	4–14 (0–4)	26 – Whittington	13 – McDowell	3 – Williams	Fant–Ewing Coliseum (237); Monroe, LA
01/15/2022; 2:00 p.m., ESPN+		at Troy	L 57–89	4–15 (0–5)	17 – Whittington	2 – Tied	5 – Sutton	Trojan Arena (1,781); Troy, AL
01/20/2022; 5:00 p.m., ESPN+		at Coastal Carolina	Postponed					HTC Center; Conway, SC
01/22/2022; 1:00 p.m., ESPN+		at Appalachian State	L 61–67	4–16 (0–6)	17 – Sutton	10 – McDowell	3 – Tied	Holmes Center (278); Boone, NC
01/29/2022; 2:00 p.m., ESPN+		at Louisiana	L 55–76	4–17 (0–7)	17 – Whittington	10 – Manuel	1 – Tied	Cajundome (388); Lafayette, LA
02/05/2022; 2:00 p.m., ESPN+		Little Rock	L 47–64	4–18 (0–8)	25 – Whittington	5 – McDowell	3 – van Schaik	Fant–Ewing Coliseum (957); Monroe, LA
02/07/2022; 5:00 p.m., ESPN+		Arkansas State	L 60–82	4–19 (0–9)	23 – Whittington	5 – Tied	4 – van Schaik	Fant–Ewing Coliseum (599); Monroe, LA
02/10/2022; 11:30 a.m., ESPN+		at UT Arlington	L 50–77	4–20 (0–10)	15 – Whittington	7 – McDowell	5 – Self	College Park Center (3,382); Arlington, TX
02/12/2022; 2:00 p.m., ESPN+		at Texas State	L 58–66	4–21 (0–11)	26 – Whittington	5 – Tied	2 – Tied	Strahan Arena (962); San Marcos, TX
02/19/2022; 2:00 p.m., ESPN+		Louisiana	L 53–73	4–22 (0–12)	16 – Brimzy	8 – McDowell	4 – Sutton	Fant–Ewing Coliseum; Monroe, LA
02/24/2022; 6:30 p.m., ESPN+		Georgia Southern	L 68–83	4–23 (0–13)	15 – Tied	6 – Tied	4 – Tied	Fant–Ewing Coliseum (346); Monroe, LA
02/26/2022; 2:00 p.m., ESPN+		Georgia State	L 65–76	4–24 (0–14)	27 – Whittington	7 – Crockett	3 – McDowell	Fant–Ewing Coliseum (296); Monroe, LA
Sun Belt Tournament
03/02/2022; 2:00 p.m., ESPN+	(12)	vs. (5) Little Rock; First Round	L 56–61	4–25	26 – Whittington	10 – Crockett	2 – Tied	Pensacola Bay Center; Pensacola, FL
*Non-conference game. ^{#}Rankings from AP Poll. (#) Tournament seedings in parentheses. All times are in Central Time.

== See also ==
- 2021–22 Louisiana–Monroe Warhawks men's basketball team
