= Shereka Wright =

American basketball player and coach (born 1981)

UT Arlington Mavericks
- Title: Head coach
- League: United Athletic Conference

Personal information
- Born: September 21, 1981 (age 45)
- Listed height: 5 ft 10 in (1.78 m)
- Listed weight: 155 lb (70 kg)

Career information
- High school: Copperas Cove (Copperas Cove, Texas)
- College: Purdue (2000–2004)
- WNBA draft: 2004: 1st round, 13th overall pick
- Drafted by: Detroit Shock
- Playing career: 2004–2005
- Position: Forward
- Number: 50
- Coaching career: 2006–present

Career history

Playing
- 2004–2005: Phoenix Mercury

Coaching
- 2006–2013: Texas Tech (assistant)
- 2013–2018: Alabama (assistant)
- 2018–2020: Vanderbilt (associate HC)
- 2020–present: UT Arlington

Career highlights
- All-American – USBWA (2004); Second-team All-American – AP (2004); 2× Third-team All-American – AP (2002, 2003); 2× Big Ten Tournament MOP (2003, 2004); 3× First-team All-Big Ten (2002–2004); Big Ten All-Freshman Team (2001); Gatorade National Player of the Year (2000); Texas Miss Basketball (2000)
- Stats at Basketball Reference

Shereka Monique Wright (born September 21, 1981) is an American basketball player and coach.

== Career ==
She is the head coach at UT Arlington. Wright retired from competitive basketball in 2006 and has worked as an assistant coach since, at Texas Tech, Alabama, and Vanderbilt.

Wright was selected with the 13th overall pick in the 2004 WNBA draft by the Detroit Shock. She appeared in 49 games over two seasons for the Phoenix Mercury and averaged 3.1 points and 1.6 rebounds over 12 minutes per game. She retired after missing the 2006 season with a torn achilles tendon.

== Career statistics ==
Legend
GP	Games played	GS	Games started	MPG	Minutes per game	RPG	Rebounds per game
APG	Assists per game	SPG	Steals per game	BPG	Blocks per game	PPG	Points per game
TO	Turnovers per game	FG%	Field-goal percentage	3P%	3-point field-goal percentage	FT%	Free-throw percentage
**Bold**	Career best	°	League leader

=== WNBA ===
==== Regular season ====
Year	Team	GP	GS	MPG	FG%	3P%	FT%	RPG	APG	SPG	BPG	TO	PPG
2004	Phoenix	24	0	10.1	31.0	**46.2**	**78.1**	1.1	0.3	0.1	0.0	**0.6**	2.4
2005	Phoenix	**25**	**5**	**13.8**	**40.7**	31.4	67.3	**2.0**	**0.9**	**0.6**	**0.1**	1.1	**3.8**
Career	2 years, 1 team	49	5	12.0	36.6	35.4	71.4	1.6	0.6	0.3	0.1	0.9	3.1

=== College ===
Legend
GP	Games played	GS	Games started	MPG	Minutes per game
FG%	Field goal percentage	3P%	3-point field goal percentage	FT%	Free throw percentage
RPG	Rebounds per game	APG	Assists per game	SPG	Steals per game
BPG	Blocks per game	PPG	Points per game	**Bold**	Career high

Year	Team	GP	Points	FG%	3P%	FT%	RPG	APG	SPG	BPG	PPG
2000–01	Purdue	**38**	377	45.5%	**51.3%**	66.5%	4.7	1.8	1.1	0.6	9.9
2001–02	Purdue	30	569	48.5%	23.5%	73.5%	**6.6**	1.9	**1.6**	**1.3**	19.0
2002–03	Purdue	34	643	46.7%	31.8%	**74.3%**	6.3	**2.7**	1.5	1.0	18.9
2003–04	Purdue	33	**662**	**49.4%**	36.1%	73.7%	6.1	2.3	1.0	1.0	**20.1**
Career		135	2251	47.8%	34.7%	72.5%	5.9	2.2	1.3	1.0	16.7

== Head coaching record ==
- UT Arlington
- WAC

Record table
Season	Team	Overall	Conference	Standing	Postseason
UT Arlington (Sun Belt Conference) (2020–2022)
2020–21	UT Arlington	13–7	11–4	2nd (West)	
2021–22	UT Arlington	20–8	11–4	2nd	NCAA First Round
UT Arlington (Western Athletic Conference) (2022–2026)
2022–23	UT Arlington	14–17	8–10	T–8th	
2023–24	UT Arlington	17–16	11–9	5th	
2024–25	UT Arlington	18–14	10–6	T–2nd	WNIT Second Round
2025–26	UT Arlington	12–21	4–14	T–6th	
UT Arlington:		94–83 (.531)	55–47 (.539)		
Total:		94–83 (.531)			
National champion Postseason invitational champion Conference regular season champion Conference regular season and conference tournament champion Division regular season champion Division regular season and conference tournament champion Conference tournament champion
