= Barack Obama Academy =

Coordinates: 37°45′4″N 122°9′25″W

Location
- 9736 Lawlor Street; Oakland, California; United States

Information
- Type: Public school
- Established: 2007
- School district: Oakland Unified School District
- Principal: LaTanya Williams
- Faculty: 5
- Grades: 6-8
- Enrollment: 24

Barack Obama Academy is a small alternative middle school in Oakland, California. It is part of the Oakland Unified School District and is the first middle school in the United States to be officially named or renamed after US President Barack Obama in March 2009. Established in 2007, the middle school was formerly known as the Alternative Learning Community. The name change was prompted by the school's students.

As of 2011, it had 24 students, most of whom were low income African Americans.
