= 2021–22 Lamar Lady Cardinals basketball team =

Intercollegiate basketball season

2021–22 Lamar Lady Cardinals basketball
- Conference: Western Athletic Conference
- Record: 14–15 (8–10 WAC)
- Head coach: Aqua Franklin (3rd season)
- Assistant coaches: Bianca Smith (2nd season); Charinee Mitchell (3rd season); Sadie Edwards (1st season)
- Home arena: Montagne Center (Capacity: 10,080)

2021–22 WAC women's basketball standings
	Conf.				Overall
Team	W		L	PCT	W		L	PCT
Stephen F. Austin †	17	–	1	.944	28	–	5	.848
Grand Canyon	14	–	4	.778	22	–	10	.688
California Baptist*	13	–	5	.722	23	–	9	.719
Utah Valley	10	–	8	.556	16	–	15	.516
Abilene Christian	9	–	9	.500	17	–	13	.567
Sam Houston State	9	–	9	.500	15	–	16	.484
Tarleton State*	8	–	10	.444	16	–	13	.552
Lamar	8	–	10	.444	14	–	15	.483
Texas–Rio Grande Valley	8	–	10	.444	14	–	19	.424
Seattle	6	–	12	.333	11	–	19	.367
Dixie State*	6	–	12	.333	10	–	19	.345
New Mexico State	6	–	12	.333	10	–	19	.345
Chicago State	3	–	15	.167	4	–	23	.148
† 2022 WAC tournament winner * ineligible for the 2022 NCAA tournament due to transition from Division II

The 2021–22 Lamar Lady Cardinals basketball team represented Lamar University during the 2021–22 NCAA Division I women's basketball season. The Lady Cardinals, led by third-year head coach Aqua Franklin, played their home games at the Montagne Center in Beaumont, Texas as members of the Western Athletic Conference.

This season was the Lady Cardinals' first and only as members of the Western Athletic Conference. Lamar was one of four schools, all from Texas, that left the Southland Conference in July 2021 to join the WAC. The Lady Cardinals finished the 2021–22 season with an overall record of 14–15 and 8–10 in conference play. The seventh-seeded Lady Cardinals won their WAC tournament opening-round game against tenth seed New Mexico State 65–54. Their season ended with a first-round tournament loss to sixth seed 2021–22 Sam Houston State Bearkats women's basketball team

== Previous season ==
The Lady Cardinals finished the 2020–21 season with an overall record of 10–14 and 9–6 in conference play. Their season ended losing to Central Arkansas in a quarterfinal game in the Southland Conference tournament. Lamar entered the tournament as fourth seed.

== Offseason ==
=== Incoming transfers ===
Lamar incoming transfers
Name	Number	Pos.	Height	Year	Hometown	Previous school
Brooklyn Mitchell	4	G	5'7"	Junior	New Orleans, LA	Kansas
NJ Weems	22	F	6'1"	Sophomore	Minneapolis, MN	Moberly Area Community College

== Roster ==
2021–22 Lamar Lady Cardinals women's basketball team
Players
Coaches

Pos.	#	Name	Height	Year	Previous school	Hometown
G	0	Kayla Mitchell	5 ft 3 in (1.6 m)	Jr	Jonesboro HS	Jonesboro, AR
G	1	Hope Lemelle	5 ft 7 in (1.7 m)	Fr	Duncanville HS	Cedar Hill, TX
G	2	Angel Hastings	5 ft 6 in (1.68 m)	Sr	Wagner HS	San Antonio, TX
G	3	Sabria Dean	5 ft 7 in (1.7 m)	So	Mineola HS	Mineola, TX
G	4	Brooklyn Mitchell	5 ft 7 in (1.7 m)	Jr	Ursuline Academy; Kansas	New Orleans, LA
G	5	M'Kayla Malone	5 ft 7 in (1.7 m)	So	Saginaw HS	Fort Worth, TX
G	10	Malay McQueen	5 ft 7 in (1.7 m)	Jr	Bowie HS	Arlington, TX
G	11	Portia Adams	5 ft 6 in (1.68 m)	Fr	Cedar Hill HS	Cedar Hill, TX
F	12	Micaela Wilson	6 ft 1 in (1.85 m)		Rayville HS	Rayville, LA
F	13	Taliah Hill	6 ft 0 in (1.83 m)	Fr	Brusly HS	Brusly, LA
F	14	Emma Imevbore	6 ft 4 in (1.93 m)	Fr	King Henry; London Thunder U18	London, England
G	21	Anyssia Gibbs	5 ft 10 in (1.78 m)	Sr	Granite Hills HS	Apple Valley, CA
F	22	NJ Weems	6 ft 1 in (1.85 m)	So	DeLaSalle HS	Minneapolis, MN
C	25	Bebe Galloway	5 ft 11 in (1.8 m)	So	Ball HS	Galveston, TX
F/C	41	Akasha Davis	6 ft 2 in (1.88 m)	Fr	Wylie East HS	Dallas, TX

Head coach

- Aqua Franklin (Texas A&M)

Assistant coach(es)

- Bianca Smith (Colorado)
- Charinee Mitchell (Southeastern Louisiana)
- Sadie Edwards (USC)

Legend

- (C) Team captain
- (S) Suspended
- (I) Ineligible
- (W) Walk-on
- Injured
- Current redshirt

Roster

== Schedule ==
Date time, TV	Rank^{#}	Opponent^{#}	Result	Record	High points	High rebounds	High assists	Site (attendance) city, state
Exhibition
November 6, 2021*; 2:00 pm, ESPN+		Jarvis Christian	W 95–47		19 – Davis; Dean	– -	8 – Dean	Montagne Center; Beaumont, TX
Non-conference season
November 9, 2021*; 7:00 pm		at New Mexico	L 54–71	0–1	14 – Dean	11 – Gibbs	3 – Gibbs; Hastings	The Pit (3,800); Albuquerque, NM
November 12, 2021*; 7:00 pm, ESPN+		Howard Payne	W 107–37	1–1	31 – Dean	13 – Davis	12 – Mitchell	Montagne Center (1,512); Beaumont, TX
November 16, 2021*; 6:00 pm, ESPN+		at Ole Miss	L 37–71	1–2	11 – Hastings	6 – Davis	2 – 3 players	SJB Pavilion (1,232); Oxford, MS
November 19, 2021*; 7:00 pm, ESPN+		at Texas Tech	L 68–72 ^{OT}	1–3	18 – McQueen	8 – Davis; Gibbs	4 – McQueen	United Supermarkets Arena (4,339); Lubbock, TX
November 28, 2021*; 2:00 pm, ESPN+		Longwood	L 59–62	1–4	18 – Davis	14 – Davis	4 – Mitchell	Montagne Center (511); Beaumont, TX
December 2, 2021*; 2:00 pm, ESPN+		Loyola (New Orleans)	W 57–44	2–4	25 – Dean	9 – Gibbs	4 – McQueen	Montagne Center (512); Beaumont, TX
December 7, 2021*; 7:00 pm, ESPN+		McNeese State	W 88–76	3–4	25 – Davis	9 – Gibbs	5 – Dean	Montagne Center (511); Beaumont, TX
December 10, 2021*; 7:00 pm, ESPN+		at Texas State	W 63–59	4–4	15 – Gibbs	6 – Tied - 3	4 – Gibbs; Hastings	Strahan Coliseum (728); San Marcos, TX
December 15, 2021*; 7:00 pm, ESPN+		Prairie View A&M	W 66–46	5–4	18 – Davis	7 – Davis	5 – Mitchell	Montagne Center (698); Beaumont, TX
December 22, 2021*; 2:00 pm, ESPN+		Southeastern Louisiana	Canceled due to COVID-19 issues					Montagne Center; Beaumont, TX
WAC season
December 30, 2021; 7:00 pm, ESPN+		Sam Houston State	Game postponed due to COVID-19 protocol within Lamar team					Montagne Center; Beaumont, TX
January 1, 2022; 7:00 pm, ESPN+		Stephen F. Austin	Game postponed due to COVID-19 protocol within Lamar team					Montagne Center; Beaumont, TX
January 8, 2022; 3:00 pm, ESPN+		at Grand Canyon	L 72–73 ^{1OT}	5–5 (0–1)	15 – Hastings	8 – Davis	8 – K. Mitchell	Grand Canyon University Arena (421); Phoenix, AZ
January 10, 2022; 4:00 pm, ESPN+		at New Mexico State	L 53–57	5–6 (0–2)	11 – Gibbs	9 – Gibbs	3 – Gibbs; Dean	Pan American Center (701); Las Cruces, NM
January 13, 2022; 3:30 pm, ESPN+		at Sam Houston State	W 68–55	6–6 (1–2)	17 – McQueen	6 – McQueen	5 – Gibbs	Bernard Johnson Coliseum (181); Huntsville, TX
January 15, 2022; 1:00 pm, ESPN+		at Chicago State	W 55–47	7–6 (2–2)	20 – Gibbs	5 – McQueen; Dean	2 – McQueen	Emil and Patricia Jones Convocation Center (100); Chicago, IL
January 17, 2022; 7:00 pm, ESPN+		Stephen F. Austin	L 53–65	7–7 (2–3)	14 – Dean	8 – Wilson	5 – McQueen	Montagne Center (678); Beaumont, TX
January 20, 2022; 7:00 pm, ESPN+		Dixie State	W 75–65	8–7 (3–3)	19 – Davis	11 – Davis	6 – Hastings	Montagne Center (718); Beaumont, TX
January 22, 2022; 2:00 pm, ESPN+		Utah Valley	W 59–55 ^{2OT}	9–7 (4–3)	15 – Hastings	11 – Davis	5 – Hastings	Montagne Center (938); Beaumont, TX
January 27, 2022; 2:00 pm, ESPN+		at Tarleton State	W 53–45	10–7 (5–3)	21 – Davis	10 – Davis	7 – Dean	Wisdom Gymnasium (752); Stephenville, TX
January 29, 2022; 1:00 pm, ESPN+		at Abilene Christian	L 54–66	10–8 (5–4)	18 – Dean	6 – Gibbs; Dean	2 – Dean; Adams	Teague Center (546); Abilene, TX
February 3, 2022; 7:00 pm, ESPN+		Texas–Rio Grande Valley	W 53–39	11–8 (6–4)	23 – Davis	8 – Dean	3 – McQueen	Montagne Center (1,016); Beaumont, TX
February 10, 2022; 7:00 pm, ESPN+		California Baptist	L 56–71	11–9 (6–5)	16 – Hastings	6 – Gibbs	4 – Hastings	Montagne Center (1,228); Beaumont, TX
February 12, 2022; 2:00 pm, ESPN+		Seattle	L 56–65	11–10 (6–6)	15 – Hastings	9 – Davis	4 – Hastings	Montagne Center (1,054); Beaumont, TX
February 14, 2022; 7:00 pm, ESPN+		Sam Houston State	L 57–66	11–11 (6–7)	13 – Davis	6 – Davis	5 – Adams	Montagne Center (1,008); Beaumont, TX
February 19, 2022; 2:00 pm, ESPN+		at Stephen F. Austin	L 40–57	11–12 (6–8)	10 – Dean	7 – Gibbs	3 – Dean	William R. Johnson Coliseum (1,587); Nacogdoches, TX
February 26, 2022; 2:00 pm, ESPN+		Tarleton State	L 64–67	11–13 (6–9)	19 – Hastings	6 – Gibbs	4 – Hastings; Dean	Montagne Center (1,027); Beaumont, TX
February 28, 2022; 7:30 pm, ESPN+		Abilene Christian	W 70–60	12–13 (7–9)	21 – Sabria	9 – Gibbs	5 – Hastings; K. Mitchell	Montagne Center (1,086); Beaumont, TX
March 3, 2022; 7:00 pm, ESPN+		at Texas–Rio Grande Valley	W 69–61	13–13 (8–9)	21 – Hastings	12 – Davis	5 – K. Mitchell; Dean	UTRGV Fieldhouse (886); Edinburg, TX
March 5, 2022; 3:00 pm, ESPN+		at California Baptist	L 76–101	13–14 (8–10)	17 – mevbore	8 – Imevbore	3 – K. Mitchell; B. Mitchell	CBU Events Center (450); Riverside, CA
WAC tournament
March 8, 2022; 5:30 pm, ESPN+	(7)	vs. (10) New Mexico State; Opening round	W 65–54	14–14	25 – Hastings	9 – Davis	3 – Davis	Orleans Arena (303); Paradise, NV
March 9, 2022; 5:30 pm, ESPN+	(7)	vs. (6) Sam Houston; First round	L 69–73	14–15	21 – Dean	8 – Dean	7 – Dean	Orleans Arena (544); Paradise, NV
*Non-conference game. ^{#}Rankings from AP poll. (#) Tournament seedings in parentheses. All times are in Central Time.

== See also ==
- 2021–22 Lamar Cardinals basketball team
