= 2022 WAC women's basketball tournament =

- Classification: Division I
- Season: 2021–22
- Teams: 10
- Site: Orleans Arena; Paradise, Nevada
- Champions: Stephen F. Austin (1st title)
- Winning coach: Mark Kellogg (1st title)
- MVP: Zya Nugent (Stephen F. Austin)
- Television: ESPN+

2021–22 WAC women's basketball standings
	Conf.				Overall
Team	W		L	PCT	W		L	PCT
Stephen F. Austin †	17	–	1	.944	28	–	5	.848
Grand Canyon	14	–	4	.778	22	–	10	.688
California Baptist*	13	–	5	.722	23	–	9	.719
Utah Valley	10	–	8	.556	16	–	15	.516
Abilene Christian	9	–	9	.500	17	–	13	.567
Sam Houston State	9	–	9	.500	15	–	16	.484
Tarleton State*	8	–	10	.444	16	–	13	.552
Lamar	8	–	10	.444	14	–	15	.483
Texas–Rio Grande Valley	8	–	10	.444	14	–	19	.424
Seattle	6	–	12	.333	11	–	19	.367
Dixie State*	6	–	12	.333	10	–	19	.345
New Mexico State	6	–	12	.333	10	–	19	.345
Chicago State	3	–	15	.167	4	–	23	.148
† 2022 WAC tournament winner * ineligible for the 2022 NCAA tournament due to transition from Division II

The 2022 WAC women's basketball tournament was the postseason women's basketball tournament for the Western Athletic Conference during the 2021–22 season. All games were played at Orleans Arena in Paradise, Nevada, from March 8 to 12, 2022. Regular-season champion Stephen F. Austin, in its first WAC season after moving from the Southland Conference following the 2020–21 season, also won the tournament, receiving the WAC's automatic bid to the 2022 NCAA tournament.

== Seeds ==
Eleven of the 13 teams in the WAC were eligible to compete in the conference tournament. Dixie State and Tarleton were ineligible due to their transitions from Division II to Division I. Teams were seeded by record within the conference, with a tiebreaker system to seed teams with identical conference records. Only the top 10 teams in the conference qualified for the tournament.

Seed	School	Conference	Tiebreaker 1	Tiebreaker 2
1	Stephen F. Austin	17-1	3–1 vs Seattle/SFA	
2	Grand Canyon	14–4		
3	California Baptist	13-5		
4	Utah Valley	10-8		
5	Abilene Christian	9-9	2-0 vs. Sam Houston	
6	Sam Houston	9-9	0-2 vs. Abilene Christian	
7	Lamar	8-10	2-0 vs. UTRGV	
8	UTRGV	8-10	0-2 vs. Lamar	
9	Seattle	6-12	1-1 vs. New Mexico State	0-1 vs. Stephen F. Austin
10	New Mexico State	6-12	1-1 vs. Seattle	0-2 vs. Stephen F. Austin

== Schedule ==
Session	Game	Time*	Matchup^{#}	Score	Television	Attendance
First round – Tuesday, March 8, 2022
1	1	12:00 pm	No. 8 UTRGV vs. No. 9 Seattle	71–61	ESPN+	
1	2	2:30 pm	No. 7 Lamar vs. No. 10 New Mexico State	66–54	ESPN+	
Second round – Wednesday, March 9, 2022
2	3	12:00 pm	No. 5 Abilene Christian vs. No. 8 UTRGV	70–73	ESPN+	
2	4	2:30 pm	No. 6 Sam Houston vs. No. 7 Lamar	73–69	ESPN+	
Quarterfinals – Thursday, March 10, 2022
3	5	12:00pm	No. 4 Utah Valley vs. No. 8 UTRGV	72–57	ESPN+	
3	6	2:30 pm	No. 3 California Baptist vs. No. 6 Sam Houston	85–78	ESPN+	
Semifinals – Friday, March 11, 2022
4	7	12:00pm	No. 1 Stephen F. Austin vs. No. 4 Utah Valley	68-42	ESPN+	
4	8	2:30 pm	No. 2 Grand Canyon vs. No. 3 California Baptist	64-60	ESPN+	
Championship – Saturday, March 12, 2022
5	9	2:00 pm	No. 1 Stephen F. Austin vs. No. 2 Grand Canyon	74-57	ESPN+	
*Game times in PT. #-Rankings denote tournament seeding.

== Bracket ==
First round Tuesday, March 8 ESPN+
8	UTRGV	71
9	Seattle	61
7	Lamar	66
10	New Mexico State	54

Second round Wednesday, March 9 ESPN+
5	Abilene Christian	70
8	UTRGV	73
6	Sam Houston	73
7	Lamar	69

Third round Thursday, March 10; ESPN+
4	Utah Valley	72
8	UTRGV	57
3	California Baptist	85
6	Sam Houston	79

Semifinals; Friday, March 11; ESPN+
1	Stephen F. Austin	68
4	Utah Valley	42
2	Grand Canyon	64
3	California Baptist	60

Championship; Saturday, March 12; ESPN+
1	Stephen F. Austin	74
2	Grand Canyon	57

* denotes overtime period

== See also ==
- Western Athletic Conference women's basketball tournament
- Western Athletic Conference
