= 2021–22 Sam Houston State Bearkats women's basketball team =

Intercollegiate basketball season

2021–22 Sam Houston State Bearkats women's basketball
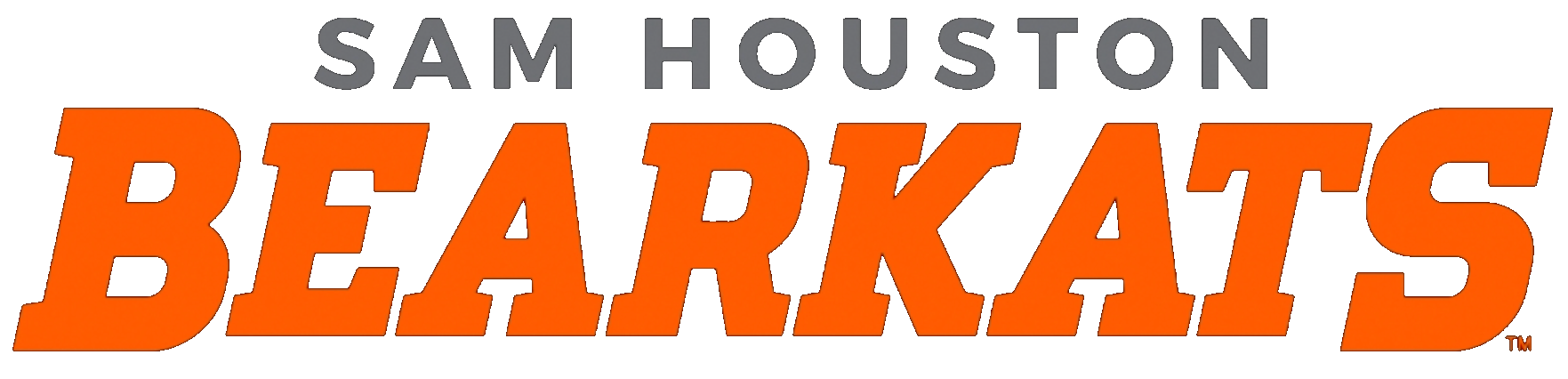
- Conference: Western Athletic Conference
- Record: 15–16 (9–9 WAC)
- Head coach: Ravon Justice (4th season)
- Assistant coaches: Raru Archer; Brittany Bigott; Brittany Mason
- Home arena: Bernard Johnson Coliseum (Capacity: 6,100)

2021–22 WAC women's basketball standings
	Conf.				Overall
Team	W		L	PCT	W		L	PCT
Stephen F. Austin †	17	–	1	.944	28	–	5	.848
Grand Canyon	14	–	4	.778	22	–	10	.688
California Baptist*	13	–	5	.722	23	–	9	.719
Utah Valley	10	–	8	.556	16	–	15	.516
Abilene Christian	9	–	9	.500	17	–	13	.567
Sam Houston State	9	–	9	.500	15	–	16	.484
Tarleton State*	8	–	10	.444	16	–	13	.552
Lamar	8	–	10	.444	14	–	15	.483
Texas–Rio Grande Valley	8	–	10	.444	14	–	19	.424
Seattle	6	–	12	.333	11	–	19	.367
Dixie State*	6	–	12	.333	10	–	19	.345
New Mexico State	6	–	12	.333	10	–	19	.345
Chicago State	3	–	15	.167	4	–	23	.148
† 2022 WAC tournament winner * ineligible for the 2022 NCAA tournament due to transition from Division II

The 2021–22 Sam Houston State Bearkats women's basketball team represented Sam Houston State University during the 2021–22 NCAA Division I women's basketball season. The Bearkats, led by fourth year head coach Ravon Justice, play their home games at the Bernard Johnson Coliseum as members of the Western Athletic Conference.

This season was the Sam Houston State Bearkats' first as members of the Western Athletic Conference. Sam Houston State was one of four schools, all from Texas, that left the Southland Conference in July 2021 to join the WAC.

== Roster ==
2021–22 Sam Houston State Bearkats women's basketball team
Players
Coaches

Pos.	#	Name	Height	Year	Previous school	Hometown
G	0	Sydnee Kemp	5 ft 5 in (1.65 m)	RS Fr	Lee's Summit West HS	Kansas City, MO
F	1	Jordyn Weaver	5 ft 10 in (1.78 m)	Fr	Wagner HS	San Antonio, TX
G	2	Ky'lie Scott	5 ft 9 in (1.75 m)	So	Denton HS; Little Rock	Denton, TX
G	4	Mikayla Woods	5 ft 6 in (1.68 m)	So	Hendrickson HS; UTSA	Pflugerville, TX
G	5	Shuntorri Rodgers	5 ft 11 in (1.8 m)	So	Minden HS; Western Texas College	Minden, LA
G	10	Faith Cook	5 ft 2 in (1.57 m)	RS Sr	Goose Creek HS; UTEP	Baytown, TX
F	11	Courtney Cleveland	5 ft 10 in (1.78 m)	Sr	Arlington HS; Pratt CC	Arlington, TX
G	12	Damaya Telemaque	5 ft 8 in (1.73 m)	Jr	Summer Creek HS; South Alabama	Houston, TX
F	13	Kaylee Jefferson	6 ft 0 in (1.83 m)	RS So	Sulphur Springs HS; East Carolina	Sulphur Springs, TX
G/F	14	Raanee Smith	6 ft 2 in (1.88 m)	So	Friends' Central School; Colorado	Philadelphia, PA
F	15	Devyn Wilson	5 ft 11 in (1.8 m)	Jr	Norcross HS; George Mason	Smyrna, GA
F	21	Madelyn Batista	6 ft 2 in (1.88 m)	Jr	Winter Park HS; Daytona State CC	Orlando, FL
F	22	Braylyn Dollar	6 ft 0 in (1.83 m)	Jr	Monterey HS; West Texas A&M	Lubbock, TX
G	24	LeAndra Echi	5 ft 8 in (1.73 m)	RS Sr	Vermont Academy; Northwest Florida State College; Indiana State	Beacon, NY
F	30	Deondra Young	6 ft 0 in (1.83 m)	Fr	Rudder HS	Bryan, TX

Head coach

- Ravon Justice (USAO)

Assistant coach(es)

- Brittany Mason (Houston)
- Raru Archer (Texas Southern)
- Brittany Bigott (St. Thomas (TX))

Legend

- (C) Team captain
- (S) Suspended
- (I) Ineligible
- (W) Walk-on
- Injured
- Current redshirt

Roster
Last update: March 7, 2023

== Schedule ==
Date time, TV	Rank^{#}	Opponent^{#}	Result	Record	Site (attendance) city, state
Non–conference games
Nov 11, 2021*; 6:30 pm, ESPN+		Wiley College	W 86–62	1–0	Bernard Johnson Coliseum (342); Huntsville, TX
Nov 13, 2021*; 2:00 pm, ESPN+		at UT Arlington	L 54–72	1–1	College Park Center (1,008); Arlington, TX
Nov 15, 2021*; 2:00 pm, ESPN+		at Tulsa	L 48–64	1–2	Reynolds Center (1,898); Tulsa, OK
Nov 17, 2021*; 5:00 pm, ESPN+		USAO	W 88–73	2–2	Bernard Johnson Coliseum (524); Huntsville, TX
Nov 20, 2021*; 3:00 pm, ESPN+		Hartford	W 88–65	3–2	Bernard Johnson Coliseum (231); Huntsville, TX
Nov 27, 2021*; 2:00 pm, ESPN+		at Arkansas	L 66–92	3–3	Bud Walton Arena (3,335); Fayetteville, AR
Nov 30, 2021*; 6:30 pm, ESPN+		Longwood	W 66–65	4–3	Bernard Johnson Coliseum (238); Huntsville, TX
Dec 10, 2021*; 6:30 pm		at Louisiana Tech	L 52–77	4–4	Thomas Assembly Center (1,737); Ruston, LA
Dec 13, 2021*; 11:30 pm, SECN+		at Alabama	L 50–84	4–5	Coleman Coliseum (2,500); Tuscaloosa, AL
Dec 16, 2021*; 6:30 pm, ESPN+		Rice	L 64–74	4–6	Bernard Johnson Coliseum (204); Huntsville, TX
Dec 20, 2021*; 6:30 pm, ESPN+		Arlington Baptist	W 132–55	5–6	Bernard Johnson Coliseum (140); Huntsville, TX
WAC conference games
Dec 30, 2021; 7:00 pm, ESPN+		at Lamar	Postponed - Game moved to Feb 14, 2022 due to COVID19 protocol on Lamar team		Montagne Center; Beaumont, TX
Jan 1, 2022; 2:00 pm, ESPN+		at Texas–Rio Grande Valley	Postponed - Game moved to January 24, 2022		UTRGV Fieldhouse; Edingburg, TX
Jan 6, 2022; 6:30 pm, ESPN+		Tarleton State	Postponed - Game moved to January 17, 2022		Bernard Johnson Coliseum; Huntsville, TX
Jan 8, 2022; 3:00 pm, ESPN+		Abilene Christian	L 59–70	5–7 (0–1)	Bernard Johnson Coliseum (95); Huntsville, TX
Jan 13, 2022; 6:30 pm, ESPN+		Lamar	L 55–68	5–8 (0–2)	Bernard Johnson Coliseum (181); Huntsville, TX
Jan 15, 2022; 2:00 pm, ESPN+		at Stephen F. Austin	L 46–79	5–9 (0–3)	William R. Johnson Coliseum (1,457); Nacogdoches, TX
Jan 17, 2022; 2:00 pm, ESPN+		Tarleton State; Game moved from January 6, 2022	L 61–62	5–10 (0–4)	Bernard Johnson Coliseum (94); Huntsville, TX
Jan 20, 2022; 7:00 pm, ESPN+		at New Mexico State	L 59–72	5–11 (0–5)	Pan American Center (251); Las Cruces, NM
Jan 22, 2022; 3:00 pm, ESPN+		at Grand Canyon	L 54–73	5–12 (0–6)	Grand Canyon University Arena (430); Phoenix, AZ
Jan 24, 2022; 6:00 pm, ESPN+		at Texas–Rio Grande Valley; Game moved from January 1, 2022	W 66–52	6–12 (1–6)	UTRGV Fieldhouse (312); Edinburg, TX
Jan 27, 2022; 6:30 pm, ESPN+		California Baptist	W 73–65	7–12 (2–6)	Bernard Johnson Coliseum (297); Huntsville, TX
Jan 29, 2022; 3:00 pm, ESPN+		Seattle	W 73–54	8–12 (3–6)	Bernard Johnson Coliseum (262); Huntsville, TX
Feb 3, 2022; 8:00 pm, ESPN+		at Dixie State	W 74–72 ^{OT}	9–12 (4–6)	Burns Arena (423); St. George, UT
Feb 5, 2022; 3:00 pm, ESPN+		at Utah Valley	W 69–66	10–12 (5–6)	UCCU Center (528); Orem, UT
Feb 12, 2022; 3:00 pm, ESPN+		Chicago State	W 61–58	11–12 (6–6)	Bernard Johnson Coliseum (248); Huntsville, TX
Feb 14, 2021; 7:00 pm, ESPN+		at Lamar; Game moved from Dec 30, 2021 due to COVID19 protocol on Lamar team	W 66–57	12–12 (7–6)	Montagne Center (1,008); Beaumont, TX
Feb 17, 2022; 6:00 pm, ESPN+		at Abilene Christian	L 71–88	12–13 (7–7)	Teague Center (507); Abilene, TX
Feb 19, 2022; 3:00 pm, ESPN+		Texas–Rio Grande Valley	W 69–49	13–13 (8–7)	Bernard Johnson Coliseum (205); Huntsville, TX
Feb 24, 2022; 6:30 pm, ESPN+		Stephen F. Austin	L 58–73	13–14 (8–8)	Bernard Johnson Coliseum (502); Huntsville, TX
Feb 26, 2022; 3:00 pm, ESPN+		Grand Canyon	W 69–66	14–14 (9–8)	Bernard Johnson Coliseum (222); Huntsville, TX
Mar 2, 2022; 6:00 pm, ESPN+		Tarleton State	L 63–83	14–15 (9–9)	Bernard Johnson Coliseum (1,022); Huntsville, TX
WAC Tournament
March 9, 2022; 4:30 pm, ESPN+	(6)	vs. (7) Lamar; Second Round	W 73–69	15–15	Orleans Arena (544); Paradise, NV
March 10, 2022; 4:30 pm, ESPN+	(6)	vs. (3) California Baptist; Third Round	L 78–85	15–16	Orleans Arena (307); Paradise, NV
*Non-conference game. ^{#}Rankings from AP Poll. (#) Tournament seedings in parentheses. All times are in Central Time.

== See also ==
2021–22 Sam Houston State Bearkats men's basketball team
