= Sam Houston State Bearkats basketball =

Sam Houston State Bearkats basketball may refer to:

- Sam Houston State Bearkats men's basketball
- Sam Houston State Bearkats women's basketball
