= 2021–22 Stephen F. Austin Ladyjacks basketball team =

Intercollegiate basketball season

2021–22 Stephen F. Austin Ladyjacks basketball

WAC regular-season champions

NCAA tournament, first round
- Conference: Western Athletic Conference
- Record: 28–5 (17–1 WAC)
- Head coach: Mark Kellogg (7th season)
- Assistant coaches: Leonard Bishop; Erin Mill-Reid; Chamissa Anderson
- Home arena: William R. Johnson Coliseum

2021–22 WAC women's basketball standings
	Conf.				Overall
Team	W		L	PCT	W		L	PCT
Stephen F. Austin †	17	–	1	.944	28	–	5	.848
Grand Canyon	14	–	4	.778	22	–	10	.688
California Baptist*	13	–	5	.722	23	–	9	.719
Utah Valley	10	–	8	.556	16	–	15	.516
Abilene Christian	9	–	9	.500	17	–	13	.567
Sam Houston State	9	–	9	.500	15	–	16	.484
Tarleton State*	8	–	10	.444	16	–	13	.552
Lamar	8	–	10	.444	14	–	15	.483
Texas–Rio Grande Valley	8	–	10	.444	14	–	19	.424
Seattle	6	–	12	.333	11	–	19	.367
Dixie State*	6	–	12	.333	10	–	19	.345
New Mexico State	6	–	12	.333	10	–	19	.345
Chicago State	3	–	15	.167	4	–	23	.148
† 2022 WAC tournament winner * ineligible for the 2022 NCAA tournament due to transition from Division II

The 2021–22 Stephen F. Austin Ladyjacks basketball team represented Stephen F. Austin University during the 2021–22 NCAA Division I women's basketball season. The Ladyjacks, led by seventh-year head coach Mark Kellogg, played their home games at the William R. Johnson Coliseum in Nacogdoches, Texas as members of the Western Athletic Conference (WAC).

This season is the Ladyjacks' first as members of the Western Athletic Conference. Stephen F. Austin is one of four schools, all from Texas, that left the Southland Conference in July 2021 to join the WAC.

== Roster ==
2021–22 Stephen F. Austin Lumberjacks women's basketball team
Players
Coaches

Pos.	#	Name	Height	Year	Previous school	Hometown
G	1	Zoe Nelson	6 ft 1 in (1.85 m)	Fr	Hendrickson HS	Pflugerville, TX
G	2	Tyler McCliment-Call	6 ft 0 in (1.83 m)	So	University HS; Portland	Spokane, WA
G	4	Rebekah Crane	5 ft 8 in (1.73 m)	So	MP Chapel Hill HS	Mt. Pleasant, TX
G	5	Tasharian Robinson	5 ft 11 in (1.8 m)	Sr	Clear Springs HS; UTSA	Houston, TX
G	10	Brianna Mitchell	5 ft 4 in (1.63 m)	Sr	Anderson HS	Marshall, TX
F	11	Avery Brittingham	6 ft 0 in (1.83 m)	So	Crowley HS	Fort Worth, TX
F	13	Stephanie Visscher	6 ft 0 in (1.83 m)	Sr	BG Luleå	Luleå, Sweden
G	20	Angel Scott	5 ft 10 in (1.78 m)	Fr	Deer Creek HS	Deer Creek, OK
F/C	21	Aiyana Johnson	6 ft 3 in (1.91 m)	Sr	Lee's Summit North HS	Lee's Summit, MO
G	22	Zya Nugent	5 ft 7 in (1.7 m)	Jr	Denison HS	Denison, TX
F	23	Brionna Scott	5 ft 10 in (1.78 m)	So	Deer Creek HS	Deer Creek, OK
G	24	Destini Lombard	5 ft 9 in (1.75 m)	So	LSU	New Iberia, LA
G/F	32	Franziska Prinz	6 ft 1 in (1.85 m)	So	Landrat-Lucas Gym	Leverkusen, Germany
C	33	Aaliyah Johnson	6 ft 2 in (1.88 m)	GS	Lee's Summit North HS	Lee's Summit, MO

Head coach

- Mark Kellogg (Austin College)

Assistant coach(es)

- Leonard Bishop (East Texas A&M)
- Erin Mill-Reid (Fairleigh Dickinson)
- Chamissa Anderson (Trinity International)

Legend

- (C) Team captain
- (S) Suspended
- (I) Ineligible
- (W) Walk-on
- Injured
- Current redshirt

Roster
Last update: March 10, 2023

== Schedule ==
Date time, TV	Rank^{#}	Opponent^{#}	Result	Record	Site (attendance) city, state
Non-conference regular season
November 9, 2021*; 5:00 p.m.		at UTSA	W 77–50	1–0	Convocation Center (541); San Antonio, TX
November 12, 2021*; 6:30 p.m., ESPN+		Houston	W 73–52	2–0	William R. Johnson Coliseum (1,294); Nacogdoches, TX
November 15, 2021*; 6:30 p.m., ESPN+		Southeast Missouri State	W 83–59	3–0	William R. Johnson Coliseum (323); Nacogdoches, TX
November 18, 2021*; 7:00 p.m., SECN+		at No. 24 Texas A&M	L 75–82	3–1	Reed Arena (2,913); College Station, TX
November 20, 2021*; 2:00 p.m., ESPN+		Arlington Baptist	W 137–46	4–1	William R. Johnson Coliseum (301); Nacogdoches, TX
November 26, 2021*; 6:30 p.m.		vs. New Mexico; MTE Tournament	W 71–66	5–1	Merrell Center; Katy, TX
November 27, 2021*; 4:00 p.m.		vs. Ball State; MTE Tournament	W 87–66	6–1	Merrell Center; Katy, TX
November 28, 2021*; 6:30 p.m.		vs. Louisiana–Monroe; MTE Tournament	W 80–53	7–1	Merrell Center; Katy, TX
December 4, 2021*; 2:00 p.m., ESPN+		Our Lady of the Lake	W 90–31	8–1	William R. Johnson Coliseum (1,472); Nacogdoches, TX
December 12, 2021*; 4:00 p.m.		at Gonzaga	L 54–64	8–2	McCarthey Athletic Center (2,751); Spokane, WA
December 14, 2021*; 8:00 p.m.		at Portland	L 59–70	8–3	Chiles Center (219); Portland, OR
December 20, 2021*; 1:00 p.m., ESPN+		Southeastern Louisiana	W 70–38	9–3	William R. Johnson Coliseum (1,216); Nacogdoches, TX
WAC season
December 30, 2021; 7:00 p.m., ESPN+		at Texas–Rio Grande Valley	W 65–50	10–3 (1–0)	UTRGV Fieldhouse (342); Edinburg, TX
January 1, 2022; 7:00 p.m., ESPN+		at Lamar	Postponed – game moved to January 17 due to COVID-19 issues on Lamar team		Montagne Center; Beaumont, TX
January 6, 2022; 6:30 p.m., ESPN+		Abilene Christian	Postponed – game moved to January 10		William R. Johnson Coliseum; Nacogdoches, TX
January 8, 2022; 2:00 p.m., ESPN+		Tarleton State	W 74–45	11–3 (2–0)	William R. Johnson Coliseum (1,235); Nacogdoches, TX
January 10, 2022; 6:30 p.m., ESPN+		Abilene Christian; Game moved from January 10	W 81–65	12–3 (3–0)	William R. Johnson Coliseum (1,201); Nacogdoches, TX
January 15, 2022; 2:00 p.m., ESPN+		Sam Houston State	W 79–46	13–3 (4–0)	William R. Johnson Coliseum (1,457); Nacogdoches, TX
January 17, 2022; 7:00 p.m., ESPN+		at Lamar; Game moved from January 1 due to COVID-19 issues on Lamar team	W 65–53	14–3 (5–0)	Montagne Center (678); Beaumont, TX
January 20, 2022; 7:00 p.m., ESPN+		at Grand Canyon	Postponed – game moved to January 31		Grand Canyon University Arena; Phoenix, AZ
January 22, 2022; 1:00 p.m., ESPN+		at New Mexico State	Postponed – game moved to February 14		Pan American Center; Las Cruces, NM
January 27, 2022; 6:30 p.m., ESPN+		Seattle	W 76–57	15–3 (6–0)	William R. Johnson Coliseum (1,293); Nacogdoches, TX
January 29, 2022; 2:00 p.m., ESPN+		California Baptist	W 79–62	16–3 (7–0)	William R. Johnson Coliseum (1,465); Nacogdoches, TX
January 31, 2022; 7:00 p.m., ESPN+		at Grand Canyon; Game moved from January 20	W 61–43	17–3 (8–0)	Grand Canyon University Arena (489); Phoenix, AZ
February 3, 2022; 7:00 p.m., ESPN+		at Utah Valley	W 68–53	18–3 (9–0)	UCCU Center (781); Orem, UT
February 5, 2022; 4:00 p.m., ESPN+		at Dixie State	W 81–54	19–3 (10–0)	Burns Arena (474); St. George, UT
February 10, 2022; 6:30 p.m., ESPN+		Chicago State	W 84–55	20–3 (11–0)	William R. Johnson Coliseum (1,329); Nacogdoches, TX
February 14, 2022; 3:00 p.m., ESPN+		at New Mexico State; Game moved from January 22	W 69–55	21–3 (12–0)	Pan American Center (381); Las Cruces, NM
February 16, 2022; 6:00 p.m., ESPN+		at Chicago State	W 73–49	22–3 (13–0)	Emil and Patricia Jones Convocation Center (121); Chicago, IL
February 19, 2022; 2:00 p.m., ESPN+		Lamar	W 57–40	23–3 (14–0)	William R. Johnson Coliseum (1,587); Nacogdoches, TX
February 24, 2022; 6:30 p.m., ESPN+		at Sam Houston State	W 73–58	24–3 (15–0)	Bernard Johnson Coliseum (502); Huntsville, TX
February 26, 2022; 1:00 p.m., ESPN+		at Abilene Christian	W 80–62	25–3 (16–0)	Teague Center (722); Abilene, TX
March 3, 2022; 6:30 p.m., ESPN+		New Mexico State	W 64–56	26–3 (17–0)	William R. Johnson Coliseum (1,423); Nacogdoches, TX
March 5, 2022; 2:00 p.m., ESPN+		Texas–Rio Grande Valley	L 74–76	26–4 (17–1)	William R. Johnson Coliseum (1,327); Nacogdoches, TX
WAC tournament
March 11, 2022*; 2:00 p.m., ESPN+	(1)	vs. (4) Utah Valley; Semifinals	W 68–42	27–4	Orleans Arena; Paradise, NV
March 12, 2022*; 4:00 p.m., ESPN+	(1)	vs. (2) Grand Canyon; Championship	W 74–57	28–4	Orleans Arena; Paradise, NV
NCAA tournament
March 19, 2022*; 6:30 p.m., ESPNEWS	(12 G)	vs. (5 G) No. 17 North Carolina; First round	L 66–79	28–5	McKale Center; Tucson, AZ
*Non-conference game. ^{#}Rankings from AP poll. (#) Tournament seedings in parentheses. All times are in Central.

== See also ==
- 2021–22 Stephen F. Austin Lumberjacks basketball team
