= 2021–22 Utah Valley Wolverines women's basketball team =

Intercollegiate basketball season

2021–22 Utah Valley Wolverines women's basketball
- Conference: Western Athletic Conference
- Record: 16–15 (10–8 WAC)
- Head coach: Dan Nielson (3rd season)
- Assistant coaches: Ashley Garfield (3rd season); Morgan Bailey (3rd season); Keilani Unga (3rd season)
- Home arena: UCCU Center (Capacity: 8,500); Lockhart Arena (Capacity: 2,000)

2021–22 WAC women's basketball standings
	Conf.				Overall
Team	W		L	PCT	W		L	PCT
Stephen F. Austin †	17	–	1	.944	28	–	5	.848
Grand Canyon	14	–	4	.778	22	–	10	.688
California Baptist*	13	–	5	.722	23	–	9	.719
Utah Valley	10	–	8	.556	16	–	15	.516
Abilene Christian	9	–	9	.500	17	–	13	.567
Sam Houston State	9	–	9	.500	15	–	16	.484
Tarleton State*	8	–	10	.444	16	–	13	.552
Lamar	8	–	10	.444	14	–	15	.483
Texas–Rio Grande Valley	8	–	10	.444	14	–	19	.424
Seattle	6	–	12	.333	11	–	19	.367
Dixie State*	6	–	12	.333	10	–	19	.345
New Mexico State	6	–	12	.333	10	–	19	.345
Chicago State	3	–	15	.167	4	–	23	.148
† 2022 WAC tournament winner * ineligible for the 2022 NCAA tournament due to transition from Division II

The 2021–22 Utah Valley Wolverines women's basketball team represented Utah Valley University in the 2021–22 NCAA Division I women's basketball season. Dan Nielson entered the season as head coach for his 3rd season. The Wolverines played their home games at the UCCU Center and Lockhart Arena in Orem, Utah as members of the Western Athletic Conference (WAC).

== Previous season ==
The Wolverines finished the 2020–21 season 13–7, 10–4 in WAC play to finish in second place. In the 2021 WAC women's basketball tournament, they defeated Chicago State in the quarterfinals before losing to Grand Canyon in the semifinals. Still, UVU received the WAC's automatic bid to the 2021 NCAA Division I women's basketball tournament as a No. 16 seed since California Baptist was ineligible due to their transition to Division I. UVU lost to No. 1 seed and eventual champion Stanford 87–44 in the opening round of the NCAA tournament.

== Roster ==
2021–22 Utah Valley Wolverines women's basketball team
Players
Coaches

Pos.	#	Name	Height	Year	Previous school	Hometown
F	2	Elina Tausinga	5 ft 10 in (1.78 m)	Fr	East High School	Salt Lake City, UT
G	3	Maria Carvalho	5 ft 8 in (1.73 m)	Jr	Escola secundaria de vagos	Lisbon, Portugal
F	5	Shay Fano	6 ft 0 in (1.83 m)	So	Timpview High School	Spanish Fork, UT
G	10	Saige Gibb	5 ft 10 in (1.78 m)	Fr	Timpview High School	Raymond, Alberta, Canada
F	11	Kayla Anderson	5 ft 7 in (1.7 m)	Jr	Mountain View High School	Meridian, ID
G	12	Eleyana Tafisi	5 ft 6 in (1.68 m)	Fr	Copper Hills High School	West Jordan, UT
G	13	Ally Criddle	5 ft 8 in (1.73 m)	Fr	Skyridge High School	Lehi, UT
F	14	Babalu Stewart	6 ft 0 in (1.83 m)	Jr	Friendship Christian School	Jundiai, São Paulo, Brazil
G	20	Abby Conlee	6 ft 0 in (1.83 m)	Fr	Lone Peak High School	Alpine, UT
G	21	Tahlia White	6 ft 0 in (1.83 m)	RS Fr	Mountain View High School	Orem, UT
C	22	Megan Jensen	6 ft 3 in (1.91 m)	So	Emery High School	Castle Dale, UT
G	23	Madison Grange	5 ft 11 in (1.8 m)	Jr	Skyline High School	Salt Lake City, UT
G	33	Emma Martin	5 ft 11 in (1.8 m)	So	Richfield High School	Richfield, UT
C	40	Josie Williams	6 ft 5 in (1.96 m)	Jr	Roy High School	West Haven, UT
F	45	Mae Afoa	6 ft 1 in (1.85 m)	Fr	Jordan High School	Sandy, UT

Head coach

- Dan Nielson (BYU)

Assistant coach(es)

- Ashley Garfield (BYU)
- Morgan Bailey (BYU)
- Keilani Unga (BYU)

Legend

- (C) Team captain
- (S) Suspended
- (I) Ineligible
- (W) Walk-on
- Injured
- Current redshirt

== Schedule and results ==
Date time, TV	Rank^{#}	Opponent^{#}	Result	Record	Site (attendance) city, state
Non-Conference season
Nov 9, 2021*; 6:00 pm, ESPN+		Park University	W 90–47	1–0	UCCU Center (404); Orem, UT
Nov 11, 2021*; 7:00 pm, ESPN+		Fresno State	L 62–71	1–1	UCCU Center (649); Orem, UT
Nov 16, 2021*; 6:30 pm, ESPN+		at Southern Utah	W 60–54	2–1	Centrum Arena (586); Cedar City, UT
Nov 20, 2021*; 2:00 pm, MWSN		at Nevada	L 64–70	2–2	Lawlor Events Center; Reno, NV
Nov 23, 2021*; 6:00 pm, ESPN+		Colorado Mesa	W 62–50	3–2	UCCU Center (507); Orem, UT
Nov 27, 2021*; 12:00 pm, ESPN+		Portland State	W 62–43	4–2	UCCU Center (526); Orem, UT
Dec 1, 2021*; 4:00 pm, ESPN+		UNLV	L 63–73	4–3	UCCU Center (894); Orem, UT
Dec 9, 2021*; 7:00 pm		at Montana	W 63–50	5–3	Dahlberg Arena (2,108); Missoula, MT
Dec 11, 2021*; 2:00 pm		at Montana State	L 58–67	5–4	Worthington Arena (1,178); Bozeman, MT
Dec 18, 2021*; 2:00 pm		at Utah	L 57–65	5–5	Jon M. Huntsman Center (2,003); Salt Lake City, UT
Dec 21, 2021*; 7:00 pm		at Idaho State	L 36–53	5–6	Holt Arena (925); Pocatello, ID
WAC conference season
Dec 30, 2021; 12:00 pm, ESPN+		at Abilene Christian	L 63–69	5–7 (0–1)	Teague Center (364); Abilene, TX
Jan 1, 2022; 1:00 pm, ESPN+		at Tarleton State	L 48–61	5–8 (0–2)	Wisdom Gymnasium (618); Stephenville, TX
Jan 15, 2022; 2:00 pm, ESPN+		California Baptist	L 68–83	5–9 (0–3)	UCCU Center (627); Orem, UT
Jan 17, 2022; 3:00 pm, ESPN+		at Dixie State; Rescheduled from January 8	W 68–65	6–9 (1–3)	Burns Arena (599); St. George, UT
Jan 20, 2022; 6:00 pm, ESPN+		at Texas–Rio Grande Valley	W 59–56	7–9 (2–3)	UTRGV Fieldhouse (314); Edinburg, TX
Jan 22, 2022; 1:00 pm, ESPN+		at Lamar	L 55–59 ^{2OT}	7–10 (2–4)	Montagne Center (938); Beaumont, TX
Jan 24, 2022; 6:00 pm, ESPN+		Seattle; Rescheduled from January 13	W 65–51	8–10 (3–4)	UCCU Center (491); Orem, UT
Jan 27, 2022; 6:00 pm, ESPN+		Chicago State	W 82–62	9–10 (4–4)	UCCU Center (575); Orem, UT
Feb 3, 2022; 6:00 pm, ESPN+		Stephen F. Austin	L 53–68	9–11 (4–5)	Lockhart Arena (781); Orem, UT
Feb 5, 2022; 2:00 pm, ESPN+		Sam Houston State	L 66–69	9–12 (4–6)	Lockhart Arena (528); Orem, UT
Feb 10, 2022; 6:00 pm, ESPN+		at Grand Canyon	W 58–50	10–12 (5–6)	Grand Canyon University Arena (1,103); Phoenix, AZ
Feb 12, 2022; 12:00 pm, ESPN+		at New Mexico State	W 66–32	11–12 (6–6)	Pan American Center (482); Las Cruces, NM
Feb 16, 2022; 6:00 pm, ESPN+		Tarleton State	W 75–53	12–12 (7–6)	Lockhart Arena (517); Orem, UT
Feb 19, 2022; 2:00 pm, ESPN+		Dixie State	W 99–59	13–12 (8–6)	Lockhart Arena (812); Orem, UT
Feb 24, 2022; 7:00 pm, ESPN+		at Seattle	W 67–61	14–12 (9–6)	Redhawk Center (283); Seattle, WA
Feb 26, 2022; 2:00 pm, ESPN+		at California Baptist	L 59–84	14–13 (9–7)	CBU Events Center (531); Riverside, CA
Mar 3, 2022; 6:00 pm, ESPN+		Grand Canyon	L 63–65	14–14 (9–8)	UCCU Center (831); Orem, UT
Mar 5, 2022; 12:00 pm, ESPN+		New Mexico State	W 60–51	15–14 (10–8)	UCCU Center (632); Orem, UT
WAC Tournament
Mar 10, 2022; 1:00 pm, ESPN+	(4)	vs. (8) Texas–Rio Grande Valley; Quarterfinals	W 72–57	16–14	Orleans Arena; Paradise, NV
Mar 11, 2022; 1:00 pm, ESPN+	(4)	vs. (1) Stephen F. Austin; Semifinals	L 42–68	16–15	Orleans Arena; Paradise, NV
*Non-conference game. ^{#}Rankings from AP Poll. (#) Tournament seedings in parentheses.

== See also ==
- 2021–22 Utah Valley Wolverines men's basketball team
