= 2021–22 Dixie State Trailblazers women's basketball team =

Intercollegiate basketball season

2021–22 Dixie State Trailblazers women's basketball
- Conference: Western Athletic Conference
- Record: 10–19 (6–12 WAC)
- Head coach: JD Gustin (6th season)
- Assistant coaches: Matt Legerski; Nicole Yazzie
- Home arena: Burns Arena

2021–22 WAC women's basketball standings
	Conf.				Overall
Team	W		L	PCT	W		L	PCT
Stephen F. Austin †	17	–	1	.944	28	–	5	.848
Grand Canyon	14	–	4	.778	22	–	10	.688
California Baptist*	13	–	5	.722	23	–	9	.719
Utah Valley	10	–	8	.556	16	–	15	.516
Abilene Christian	9	–	9	.500	17	–	13	.567
Sam Houston State	9	–	9	.500	15	–	16	.484
Tarleton State*	8	–	10	.444	16	–	13	.552
Lamar	8	–	10	.444	14	–	15	.483
Texas–Rio Grande Valley	8	–	10	.444	14	–	19	.424
Seattle	6	–	12	.333	11	–	19	.367
Dixie State*	6	–	12	.333	10	–	19	.345
New Mexico State	6	–	12	.333	10	–	19	.345
Chicago State	3	–	15	.167	4	–	23	.148
† 2022 WAC tournament winner * ineligible for the 2022 NCAA tournament due to transition from Division II

The 2021–22 Dixie State Trailblazers women's basketball team represented Dixie State University in the 2021–22 NCAA Division I women's basketball season. They were led by sixth-year head coach JD Gustin. The Trailblazers played their home games at Burns Arena in St. George, Utah as members of the Western Athletic Conference (WAC).

It was Dixie State's final season under that name; the school changed its name to Utah Tech University effective as of the 2022–23 school year. The Trailblazers nickname was not affected.

== Schedule ==
Date time, TV	Rank^{#}	Opponent^{#}	Result	Record	Site (attendance) city, state
Non-conference regular season
November 9, 2021*; 12:00 p.m., ESPN+		Life Pacific	W 107–57	1–0	Burns Arena (345); St. George, UT
November 12, 2021*; 6:00 p.m., ESPN+		at Portland State	L 52–80	1–1	Peter Stott Center (325); Portland, OR
November 14, 2021*; 5:00 p.m., P12N		at Oregon	L 35–84	1–2	Matthew Knight Arena (8,761); Eugene, OR
November 20, 2021*; 1:00 p.m., ESPN+		Antelope Valley	W 73–37	2–2	Burns Arena (221); St. George, UT
November 24, 2021*; 7:00 p.m., ESPN+		Kansas City	L 62–76	2–3	Burns Arena (312); St. George, UT
December 1, 2021*; 11:00 a.m.		at Utah	L 64–81	2–4	Jon M. Huntsman Center (2,737); Logan, UT
December 3, 2021*; 3:00 p.m.		at Colorado	L 53–78	2–5	Coors Events Center (956); Boulder, CO
December 11, 2021*; 6:00 p.m., ESPN+		Simpson	W 101–61	3–5	Burns Arena (369); St. George, UT
December 14, 2021*; 12:00 p.m., ESPN+		Westcliff	W 79–55	4–5	Burns Arena (943); St. George, UT
December 18, 2021*; 3:00 p.m., ESPN+		Air Force	L 48–63	4–6	Burns Arena (313); St. George, UT
December 21, 2021*; 3:00 p.m., ESPN+		Southern Utah	L 58–95	4–7	Burns Arena (367); St. George, UT
WAC regular season
December 30, 2021; 5:00 p.m., ESPN+		at Tarleton State	W 57–49	5–7 (1–0)	Wisdom Gymnasium (737); Stephenville, TX
January 1, 2022; 12:00 p.m., ESPN+		at Abilene Christian	L 53–71	5–8 (1–1)	Teague Center (385); Abilene, TX
January 8, 2022; 3:00 p.m., ESPN+		Utah Valley	Postponed – game moved to January 17, 2022		Burns Arena; St. George, UT
January 13, 2022; 7:00 p.m., ESPN+		California Baptist	L 60–88	5–9 (1–2)	Burns Arena (437); St. George, UT
January 15, 2022; 3:00 p.m., ESPN+		Seattle	W 75–69	6–9 (2–2)	Burns Arena (451); St. George, UT
January 17, 2022; 3:00 p.m., ESPN+		Utah Valley ''Rescheduled from January 8	L 65–68	6–10 (2–3)	Burns Arena (599); St. George, UT
January 20, 2022; 6:00 p.m., ESPN+		at Lamar	L 65–75	6–11 (2–4)	Montagne Center; Beaumont, TX
January 22, 2022; 1:00 p.m., ESPN+		at Texas–Rio Grande Valley	L 68–75	6–12 (2–5)	UTRGV Fieldhouse; Edinburg, TX
January 29, 2022; 3:00 p.m., ESPN+		Chicago State	W 82–70	7–12 (3–5)	Burns Arena (482); St. George, UT
February 3, 2022; 7:00 p.m., ESPN+		Sam Houston State	L 72–74 ^{OT}	7–13 (3–6)	Burns Arena (423); St. George, UT
February 5, 2022; 3:00 p.m., ESPN+		Stephen F. Austin	L 54–81	7–14 (3–7)	Burns Arena (474); St. George, UT
February 10, 2022; 6:00 p.m., ESPN+		at New Mexico State	L 82–84 ^{3OT}	7–15 (3–8)	Pan American Center (524); Las Cruces, NM
February 12, 2022; 2:00 p.m., ESPN+		at Grand Canyon	L 50–66	7–16 (3–9)	Grand Canyon University Arena (629); Phoenix, AZ
February 17, 2022; 7:00 p.m., ESPN+		New Mexico State	W 72–69	8–16 (4–9)	Burns Arena (452); St. George, UT
February 19, 2022; 2:00 p.m., ESPN+		at Utah Valley	L 59–99	8–17 (4–10)	UCCU Center (812); Orem, UT
February 24, 2022; 7:00 p.m., ESPN+		at California Baptist	W 81–77	9–17 (5–10)	CBU Events Center (520); Riverside, CA
February 26, 2022; 3:00 p.m., ESPN+		at Seattle	L 61–69	9–18 (5–11)	Redhawk Center (443); Seattle, WA
March 2, 2022; 7:00 p.m., ESPN+		Abilene Christian	W 95–81	10–18 (6–11)	Burns Center (497); St. George, UT
March 5, 2022; 3:00 p.m., ESPN+		Grand Canyon	L 59–65	10–19 (6–12)	Burns Center (547); St. George, UT
*Non-conference game. ^{#}Rankings from AP poll. (#) Tournament seedings in parentheses. All times are in Mountain.

== See also ==
- 2021–22 Dixie State Trailblazers men's basketball team
