= 2021–22 Ole Miss Rebels women's basketball team =

Intercollegiate basketball season

2021–22 Ole Miss Rebels women's basketball

NCAA tournament, first round
- Conference: Southeastern Conference
- Record: 23–9 (10–6 SEC)
- Head coach: Yolett McPhee-McCuin (4th season)
- Assistant coaches: Chris Ayers; Armintie Herrington; Shay Robinson
- Home arena: SJB Pavilion

2021–22 SEC women's basketball standings
	Conf.				Overall
Team	W		L	PCT	W		L	PCT
No. 1 South Carolina	15	–	1	.938	35	–	2	.946
No. 9 LSU	13	–	3	.813	26	–	6	.813
No. 18 Tennessee	11	–	5	.688	25	–	9	.735
Ole Miss	10	–	6	.625	23	–	9	.719
Florida	10	–	6	.625	21	–	11	.656
Georgia	9	–	7	.563	21	–	10	.677
No. 15 Kentucky †	8	–	8	.500	19	–	12	.613
Missouri	7	–	9	.438	18	–	13	.581
Arkansas	7	–	9	.438	18	–	14	.563
Alabama	6	–	10	.375	20	–	14	.588
Mississippi State	6	–	10	.375	15	–	14	.517
Texas A&M	4	–	12	.250	14	–	15	.483
Vanderbilt	4	–	12	.250	16	–	19	.457
Auburn	2	–	14	.125	10	–	18	.357
† 2022 SEC tournament winner Rankings from AP poll

The 2021–22 Ole Miss Rebels women's basketball team represented the University of Mississippi during the 2021–22 NCAA Division I women's basketball season. The Rebels, led by fourth-year head coach Yolett McPhee-McCuin, played their home games at The Sandy and John Black Pavilion at Ole Miss and competed as members of the Southeastern Conference (SEC).

== Previous season ==
The Rebels finished the season 15–12 (4–10 SEC) and received an at-large bid to the Women's National Invitation Tournament, where they lost to Rice in the championship game.

== Offseason ==
=== Departures ===
Ole Miss Departures
Name	Number	Pos.	Height	Year	Hometown	Notes
Sarah Dumitrescu	1	G	6'0"	RS Freshman	Bucharest, Romania	Transferred to Cal Poly
Valerie Nesbitt	4	G	5'8"	Senior	Nassau, Bahamas	Signed with CB Islas Canarias
Taylor Smith	21	G	5'8"	Junior	Marietta, GA	Transferred to Xavier

=== 2021 recruiting class ===
College recruiting information
Name	Hometown	School	Height	Weight	Commit date
Jaiyah Harris-Smith; G	Miami, FL	Miami Norland Senior High School	5 ft 6 in (1.68 m)	N/A	
Jaiyah Harris-Smith; G	Recruit ratings: No ratings found				
Overall recruit ranking:
Note: In many cases, Scout, Rivals, 247Sports, On3, and ESPN may conflict in their listings of height and weight.; In these cases, the average was taken. ESPN grades are on a 100-point scale.; Sources:

=== Incoming transfers ===
Ole Miss incoming transfers
Name	Number	Pos.	Height	Year	Hometown	Previous school
Lashonda Monk	1	G	5'6"	Graduate Student	Greensboro, NC	East Carolina
Destiny Salary	10	G	6'0"	Sophomore	Jonesboro, AR	Tennessee
Angel Baker	15	G	5'8"	Senior	Indianapolis, IN	Wright State

== Roster ==
2021–22 Ole Miss Rebels women's basketball team
Players
Coaches

Pos.	#	Name	Height	Year	Previous school	Hometown
F	0	Shakira Austin	6 ft 5 in (1.96 m)	Sr	Riverdale Baptist School; Maryland	Fredericksburg, VA
G	1	Lashonda Monk	5 ft 6 in (1.68 m)	RS Sr	Southwest Guilford HS; East Carolina	Greensboro, NC
G	2	Mimi Reid	5 ft 8 in (1.73 m)	RS Sr	The Patrick School	Bronx, NY
G	3	Donnetta Johnson	5 ft 11 in (1.8 m)	RS Jr	Baldwin HS; Georgia	Queens, NY
G	4	Jaiyah Harris-Smith	5 ft 6 in (1.68 m)	Fr	Miami Norland Senior HS	Miami, FL
F	5	Snudda Collins	6 ft 1 in (1.85 m)	So	Brookhaven HS	Brookhaven, MS
G	10	Destiny Salary	6 ft 0 in (1.83 m)	So	Jonesboro HS; Tennessee	Jonesboro, AR
F	11	Iyanla Kitchens	6 ft 2 in (1.88 m)	Sr	Arabia Mountain HS	Lithonia, GA
G	12	Jordan Berry	5 ft 7 in (1.7 m)	Jr	Mount Carmel Academy	New Orleans, LA
G	15	Angel Baker	5 ft 8 in (1.73 m)	Sr	Pike HS; Wright State	Indianapolis, IN
F	22	Aleah Sorrentino	6 ft 3 in (1.91 m)	RS Fr	Florida Preparatory Academy	Palm Bay, FL
G	23	Jacorriah Bracey	5 ft 10 in (1.78 m)	So	Thomas E. Edwards, Sr. HS	Drew, MS
F	24	Madison Scott	6 ft 1 in (1.85 m)	So	Bishop McNamara HS	Indian Head, MD
G	25	Tiya Douglas	5 ft 10 in (1.78 m)	Jr	Northside HS; Trinity Valley CC	Fort Smith, AR
F	32	Caitlin McGee	6 ft 1 in (1.85 m)	RS So	Sandalwood HS	Jacksonville, FL
C	40	Andeija Puckett	6 ft 2 in (1.88 m)	RS Sr	Griffin HS; Cincinnati	Griffin, GA

Head coach

- Yolett McPhee-McCuin (Rhode Island)

Assistant coach(es)

- Chris Ayers (Florida A&M)
- Armintie Herrington (Mississippi)
- Shay Robinson (Central Florida)

Legend

- (C) Team captain
- (S) Suspended
- (I) Ineligible
- (W) Walk-on
- Injured
- Current redshirt

Roster

== Schedule ==
Date time, TV	Rank^{#}	Opponent^{#}	Result	Record	High points	High rebounds	High assists	Site (attendance) city, state
Non-conference regular season
November 11, 2021*; 7:00 pm, SECN+		Belmont	L 50–62	0–1	16 – Scott	8 – Tied	2 – Tied	SJB Pavilion (1,688); Oxford, MS
November 14, 2021*; 3:00 pm, SECN		Mississippi Valley State	W 94–44	1–1	18 – Baker	10 – Austin	5 – Tied	SJB Pavilion (1,244); Oxford, MS
November 16, 2021*; 6:00 pm, SECN+		Lamar	W 71–37	2–1	20 – Austin	13 – Austin	8 – Reid	SJB Pavilion (1,232); Oxford, MS
November 19, 2021*; 7:00 pm, SECN+		Louisiana Tech	W 62–44	3–1	12 – Collins	13 – Austin	8 – Reid	SJB Pavilion (1,384); Oxford, MS
November 23, 2021*; 2:00 pm, SECN+		Jackson State	W 79–66	4–1	24 – Austin	10 – Austin	6 – Salary	SJB Pavilion (1,642); Oxford, MS
November 26, 2021*; 5:30 pm		vs. San Diego State	W 62–48	5–1	13 – Austin	9 – Austin	3 – Tied	Haas Pavilion (1,422); Berkeley, CA
November 27, 2021*; 5:00 p.m.		at California	W 64–45	6–1	14 – Austin	11 – Scott	1 – Tied	Haas Pavilion (1,382); Berkeley, CA
December 1, 2021*; 11:00 am, SECN+		New Orleans	W 92–47	7–1	21 – Baker	8 – Austin	9 – Monk	SJB Pavilion (6,896); Oxford, MS
December 5, 2021*; 1:00 pm, ESPN+		at Cincinnati	W 75–63	8–1	18 – Scott	8 – Salary	4 – Salary	Fifth Third Arena (390); Cincinnati, OH
December 11, 2021*; 1:00 pm, FloHoops		at Hofstra	W 59–37	9–1	18 – Austin	9 – Scott	3 – Tied	Mack Sports Complex (616); Hempstead, NY
December 17, 2021*; 1:00 pm, SECN+		Samford	W 73–48	10–1	20 – Austin	9 – Scott	8 – Monk	SJB Pavilion (1,228); Oxford, MS
December 20, 2021*; 12:15 pm, FloHoops		vs. Texas Tech; West Palm Beach Invitational	W 65–50	11–1	24 – Baker	5 – Tied	3 – Tied	Student Life Center; West Palm Beach, FL
December 21, 2021*; 12:15 pm, FloHoops		vs. No. 18 South Florida; West Palm Beach Invitational	W 61–53	12–1	12 – Scott	8 – Austin	3 – Tied	Student Life Center; West Palm Beach, FL
SEC regular season
January 6, 2022; 5:00 pm, SECN+		at Florida	W 74–56	13–1 (1–0)	18 – Austin	10 – Austin	3 – Monk	O'Connell Center (854); Gainesville, FL
January 9, 2022; 12:00 pm, SECN		No. 7 Tennessee	L 58–70	13–2 (1–1)	26 – Austin	9 – Austin	3 – Tied	SJB Pavilion (2,713); Oxford, MS
January 13, 2022; 6:00 pm, SECN+		Alabama	W 86–56	14–2 (2–1)	19 – Monk	10 – Scott	7 – Reid	SJB Pavilion (1,391); Oxford, MS
January 16, 2022; 2:00 pm, SECN		Mississippi State	W 86–71	15–2 (3–1)	21 – Austin	10 – Tied	5 – Tied	SJB Pavilion (2,260); Oxford, MS
January 20, 2022; 7:00 pm, SECN+		at Texas A&M	W 80–63	16–2 (4–1)	16 – Monk	8 – Tied	6 – Tied	Reed Arena (2,813); College Station, TX
January 23, 2022; 11:00 am, SECN		at No. 23 Kentucky	W 63–54	17–2 (5–1)	24 – Austin	8 – Austin	5 – Baker	Rupp Arena (5,204); Lexington, KY
January 27, 2022; 5:00 pm, ESPN	No. 24	at No. 1 South Carolina	L 40–69	17–3 (5–2)	15 – Austin	7 – Austin	2 – Tied	Colonial Life Arena (13,973); Columbia, SC
January 30, 2022; 2:00 pm, SECN+	No. 24	No. 15 Georgia	L 52–62	17–4 (5–3)	13 – Baker	11 – Austin	3 – Baker	SJB Pavilion (3,333); Oxford, MS
February 3, 2022; 4:00 pm, SECN		at Missouri	W 61–45	18–4 (6–3)	17 – Austin	10 – McGee	3 – Monk	Mizzou Arena (2,710); Columbia, MO
February 7, 2022; 6:00 pm, SECN		No. 14 LSU	L 64–68	18–5 (6–4)	20 – Baker	15 – Scott	4 – Monk	SJB Pavilion (2,209); Oxford, MS
February 13, 2022; 3:00 pm, SECN		at Mississippi State	L 59–70	18–6 (6–5)	21 – Baker	14 – Austin	3 – Monk	Humphrey Coliseum (5,100); Starkville, MS
February 17, 2022; 8:00 pm, SECN		Texas A&M	W 74–54	19–6 (7–5)	19 – Monk	14 – Scott	6 – Reid	SJB Pavilion (1,595); Oxford, MS
February 20, 2022; 2:00 pm, SECN+		at Vanderbilt	W 57–47	20–6 (8–5)	22 – Austin	15 – Austin	2 – Tied	Memorial Gymnasium (1,964); Nashville, TN
February 22, 2022; 6:00 pm, SECN+		Arkansas	W 70–62	21–6 (9–5)	16 – Monk	16 – Austin	4 – Tied	SJB Pavilion (1,936); Oxford, MS
February 24, 2022; 7:00 pm, SECN+		at Auburn	W 72–52	22–6 (10–5)	20 – Collins	7 – Scott	4 – Reid	Auburn Arena (1,975); Auburn, AL
February 27, 2022; 1:00 pm, SECN		No. 1 South Carolina	L 57–71	22–7 (10–6)	20 – Austin	8 – Scott	5 – Reid	SJB Pavilion (3,221); Oxford, MS
SEC Tournament
March 4, 2022; 2:30 pm, SECN	(4)	vs. (5) No. 23 Florida; Quarterfinals	W 70–60	23–7	27 – Austin	13 – Austin	6 – Reid	Bridgestone Arena (6,880); Nashville, TN
March 5, 2022; 4:00 pm, ESPNU	(4)	vs. (1) No. 1 South Carolina; Semifinals	L 51–61	23–8	20 – Baker	6 – Tied	3 – Tied	Bridgestone Arena; Nashville, TN
NCAA tournament
March 18, 2022; 12:30 pm, ESPN2	(7 W)	vs. (10 W) South Dakota; First Round	L 61–75	23–9	23 – Baker	11 – Austin	6 – Reid	Ferrell Center; Waco, TX
*Non-conference game. ^{#}Rankings from AP Poll. (#) Tournament seedings in parentheses. W=Wichita Region. All times are in Central Time.

== See also ==
- 2021–22 Ole Miss Rebels men's basketball team
