= 2021–22 Tarleton State Texans women's basketball team =

Intercollegiate basketball season

2021–22 Tarleton State Texans women's basketball
- Conference: Western Athletic Conference
- Record: 16–13 (8–10 WAC)
- Head coach: Misty Wilson (8th season)
- Assistant coaches: Nic Cantrell; Jake Stevens; Brechelle Beachum
- Home arena: Wisdom Gym

2021–22 WAC women's basketball standings
	Conf.				Overall
Team	W		L	PCT	W		L	PCT
Stephen F. Austin †	17	–	1	.944	28	–	5	.848
Grand Canyon	14	–	4	.778	22	–	10	.688
California Baptist*	13	–	5	.722	23	–	9	.719
Utah Valley	10	–	8	.556	16	–	15	.516
Abilene Christian	9	–	9	.500	17	–	13	.567
Sam Houston State	9	–	9	.500	15	–	16	.484
Tarleton State*	8	–	10	.444	16	–	13	.552
Lamar	8	–	10	.444	14	–	15	.483
Texas–Rio Grande Valley	8	–	10	.444	14	–	19	.424
Seattle	6	–	12	.333	11	–	19	.367
Dixie State*	6	–	12	.333	10	–	19	.345
New Mexico State	6	–	12	.333	10	–	19	.345
Chicago State	3	–	15	.167	4	–	23	.148
† 2022 WAC tournament winner * ineligible for the 2022 NCAA tournament due to transition from Division II

The 2021–22 Tarleton State Texans women's basketball team represented Tarleton State University in the 2021–22 NCAA Division I women's basketball season. The Texans, led by eighth-year head coach Misty Wilson, played their home games at the Wisdom Gym in Stephenville, Texas as members of the Western Athletic Conference (WAC).

The Texans finished the season 16–13, 8–10 in WAC play, to finish in a three-way tie for seventh place in the conference.

The season marked Tarleton State's second year of a four-year transition period from Division II to Division I. As a result, the Texans were not eligible for NCAA postseason play and could not participate in the WAC tournament. They would have been eligible to play in the CIT or CBI if invited.

== Schedule and results ==
Date time, TV	Rank^{#}	Opponent^{#}	Result	Record	Site (attendance) city, state
Non-conference regular season
November 10, 2021*; 7:00 p.m., SECN		at Arkansas	L 33–85	0–1	Bud Walton Arena (2,614); Fayetteville, AR
November 13, 2021*; 2:00 p.m., ESPN+		Champion Christian	W 82–66	1–1	Wisdom Gym (712); Stephenville, TX
November 16, 2021*; 6:00 p.m., ESPN+		Paul Quinn	W 70–46	2–1	Wisdom Gym (403); Stephenville, TX
November 20, 2021*; 1:00 p.m., ESPN+		Howard Payne	W 87–44	3–1	Wisdom Gym (501); Stephenville, TX
November 23, 2021*; 6:00 p.m., Flo Hoops		at College of Charleston	W 69–59	4–1	TD Arena (219); Charleston, SC
November 27, 2021*; 2:00 p.m., ESPN+		Western Illinois	L 54–58	4–2	Wisdom Gym (542); Stephenville, TX
December 4, 2021*; 2:00 p.m., ESPN+		Arlington Baptist	W 103–22	5–2	Wisdom Gym (444); Stephenville, TX
December 11, 2021*; 1:00 p.m.		at Weber State	L 54–64	5–3	Dee Events Center (103); Ogden, UT
December 13, 2021*; 6:00 p.m., ESPN+		Oral Roberts	W 59–55	6–3	Wisdom Gym (640); Stephenville, TX
December 18, 2021*; 1:00 p.m., ESPN+		at Northwestern State	W 51–47	7–3	Prather Coliseum (348); Natchitoches, LA
December 22, 2021*; 2:00 p.m., ESPN+		at Incarnate Word	W 58–47	8–3	McDermott Convocation Center (174); San Antonio, TX
WAC conference season
December 30, 2021; 6:00 p.m., ESPN+		Dixie State	L 49–57	8–4 (0–1)	Wisdom Gym (737); Stephenville, TX
January 1, 2022; 2:00 p.m., ESPN+		Utah Valley	W 61–48	9–4 (1–1)	Wisdom Gym (618); Stephenville, TX
January 6, 2022; 6:30 p.m., ESPN+		at Sam Houston State	Postponed – game moved to January 17, 2022		Bernard Johnson Coliseum; Huntsville, TX
January 8, 2022; 2:00 p.m., ESPN+		at Stephen F. Austin	L 45–74	9–5 (1–2)	William R. Johnson Coliseum (1,235); Nacogdoches, TX
January 13, 2022; 6:00 p.m., ESPN+		New Mexico State	W 58–56	10–5 (2–2)	Wisdom Gym (1,002); Stephenville, TX
January 15, 2022; 2:00 p.m., ESPN+		Grand Canyon	L 37–47	10–6 (2–3)	Wisdom Gym (914); Stephenville, TX
January 17, 2022; 2:00 p.m., ESPN+		at Sam Houston State; Game moved from January 6, 2022	W 62–61	11–6 (3–3)	Bernard Johnson Coliseum (94); Huntsville, TX
January 20, 2022; 8:00 p.m., ESPN+		at California Baptist	L 69–85	11–7 (3–4)	CBU Events Center (480); Riverside, CA
January 22, 2022; 4:00 p.m., ESPN+		at Seattle	W 57–56	12–7 (4–4)	Redhawk Center (240); Seattle, WA
January 27, 2022; 6:00 p.m., ESPN+		Lamar	L 45–53	12–8 (4–5)	Wisdom Gym (752); Stephenville, TX
January 29, 2022; 2:00 p.m., ESPN+		Texas–Rio Grande Valley	L 58–64	12–9 (4–6)	Wisdom Gym (1,218); Stephenville, TX
February 5, 2022; 1:00 p.m., ESPN+		at Chicago State	L 48–58	12–10 (4–7)	Emil and Patricia Jones Convocation Center (136); Chicago, IL
February 12, 2022; 1:00 p.m., ESPN+		at Abilene Christian	W 73–67	13–10 (5–7)	Teague Center (677); Abilene, TX
February 16, 2022; 7:00 p.m., ESPN+		at Utah Valley	L 53–75	13–11 (5–8)	UCCU Center (517); Orem, UT
February 19, 2022; 2:00 p.m., ESPN+		Chicago State	W 65–51	14–11 (6–8)	Wisdom Gym (1,326); Stephenville, TX
February 24, 2022; 7:00 p.m., ESPN+		at Texas–Rio Grande Valley	L 55–64	14–12 (6–9)	UTRGV Fieldhouse (512); Edinburg, TX
February 26, 2022; 2:00 p.m., ESPN+		at Lamar	W 67–64	15–12 (7–9)	Montagne Center (1,027); Beaumont, TX
March 2, 2022; 6:00 p.m., ESPN+		Sam Houston State	W 83–63	16–12 (8–9)	Wisdom Gym (1,022); Stephenville, TX
March 5, 2022; 2:00 p.m., ESPN+		Abilene Christian	L 60–80	16–13 (8–10)	Wisdom Gym (1,123); Stephenville, TX
*Non-conference game. ^{#}Rankings from AP poll. (#) Tournament seedings in parentheses. All times are in Central.

== See also ==
- 2021–22 Tarleton State Texans men's basketball team
