= 2021–22 Grand Canyon Antelopes women's basketball team =

Intercollegiate basketball season

2021–22 Grand Canyon Antelopes women's basketball

WNIT
- Conference: Western Athletic Conference
- Record: 22–10 (14–4 WAC)
- Head coach: Molly Miller (2nd season)
- Assistant coaches: Nia Jackson; Buck Scheel; Greg Gottlieb
- Home arena: GCU Arena

2021–22 WAC women's basketball standings
	Conf.				Overall
Team	W		L	PCT	W		L	PCT
Stephen F. Austin †	17	–	1	.944	28	–	5	.848
Grand Canyon	14	–	4	.778	22	–	10	.688
California Baptist*	13	–	5	.722	23	–	9	.719
Utah Valley	10	–	8	.556	16	–	15	.516
Abilene Christian	9	–	9	.500	17	–	13	.567
Sam Houston State	9	–	9	.500	15	–	16	.484
Tarleton State*	8	–	10	.444	16	–	13	.552
Lamar	8	–	10	.444	14	–	15	.483
Texas–Rio Grande Valley	8	–	10	.444	14	–	19	.424
Seattle	6	–	12	.333	11	–	19	.367
Dixie State*	6	–	12	.333	10	–	19	.345
New Mexico State	6	–	12	.333	10	–	19	.345
Chicago State	3	–	15	.167	4	–	23	.148
† 2022 WAC tournament winner * ineligible for the 2022 NCAA tournament due to transition from Division II

The 2021–22 Grand Canyon Antelopes women's basketball team represented Grand Canyon University during the 2021–22 NCAA Division I women's basketball season. The Antelopes, led by second-year head coach Molly Miller, played their home games at the GCU Arena in Phoenix, Arizona as members of the Western Athletic Conference (WAC). They finished the season 22–10, 14–4 in WAC play, to finish in second place. They made it to the WAC tournament, defeating California Baptist, but lost in the championship game, for the second straight year, to Stephen F. Austin. They then lost in the first round of the WNIT to New Mexico State.

== Schedule and results ==
Date time, TV	Rank^{#}	Opponent^{#}	Result	Record	Site (attendance) city, state
Exhibition
October 28, 2021*; 6:00 p.m., ESPN+		Western New Mexico	W 93–56		GCU Arena; Phoenix, AZ
Non-conference regular season
November 10, 2021*; 6:00 p.m., ESPN+		Arizona Christian	W 95–48	1–0	GCU Arena (2,831); Phoenix, AZ
November 16, 2021*; 6:00 p.m., ESPN+		Eastern Washington	W 64–57	2–0	GCU Arena (615); Phoenix, AZ
November 20, 2021*; 2:00 p.m., ESPN+		at Kansas City	L 62–89	2–1	Swinney Recreation Center (1,199); Kansas City, MO
November 26, 2021*; 2:00 p.m., ESPN+		Nicholls; GCU Women's Basketball Classic	W 103–55	3–1	GCU Arena; Phoenix, AZ
November 27, 2021*; 2:00 p.m., ESPN+		Houston Baptist; GCU Women's Basketball Classic	W 63–54	4–1	GCU Arena (263); Phoenix, AZ
December 1, 2021*; 6:00 p.m., ESPN+		Park (AZ)	W 98–48	5–1	GCU Arena (313); Phoenix, AZ
December 4, 2021*; 2:00 p.m.		at Cal State Fullerton	L 53–60	5–2	Titan Gym (287); Fullerton, CA
December 9, 2021*; 6:00 p.m.		at Northern Arizona	L 77–108	5–3	Walkup Skydome (227); Flagstaff, AZ
December 17, 2021*; 3:00 p.m.		vs. Liberty; South Padre Island Classic	L 61–76	5–4	South Padre Island Convention Centre (187); South Padre Island, TX
December 18, 2021*; 4:00 p.m.		vs. UTSA; South Padre Island Classic	W 62–52	6–4	TBA (411); South Padre Island, TX
December 23, 2021*; 12:00 p.m., ESPN+		UC Irvine	W 58–53	7–4	GCU Arena (486); Phoenix, AZ
WAC conference season
December 30, 2021; 6:00 p.m., ESPN+		Chicago State	W 66–49	8–4 (1–0)	GCU Arena (107); Phoenix, AZ
January 6, 2022; 6:00 p.m., ESPN+		Texas–Rio Grande Valley	L 50–62	8–5 (1–1)	GCU Arena (314); Phoenix, AZ
January 8, 2022; 2:00 p.m., ESPN+		Lamar	W 73–72 ^{OT}	9–5 (2–1)	GCU Arena (421); Phoenix, AZ
January 13, 2022; 6:00 p.m., ESPN+		at Abilene Christian	W 74–69	10–5 (3–1)	Teague Center (444); Abilene, TX
January 15, 2022; 2:00 p.m., ESPN+		at Tarleton State	W 47–37	11–5 (4–1)	Wisdom Gymnasium (914); Stephenville, TX
January 20, 2022; 6:00 p.m., ESPN+		Stephen F. Austin	Postponed – game moved to January 31		GCU Arena; Phoenix, AZ
January 22, 2022; 2:00 p.m., ESPN+		Sam Houston State	W 73–54	12–5 (5–1)	GCU Arena (430); Phoenix, AZ
January 29, 2022; 2:00 p.m., ESPN+		New Mexico State	W 61–59	13–5 (6–1)	GCU Arena (491); Phoenix, AZ
January 31, 2022; 6:00 p.m., ESPN+		Stephen F. Austin; Game moved from January 20	L 43–61	13–6 (6–2)	GCU Arena (489); Phoenix, AZ
February 3, 2022; 6:00 p.m., ESPN+		at Seattle	W 64–59	14–6 (7–2)	Redhawk Center (234); Seattle, WA
February 5, 2022; 1:00 p.m., ESPN+		at California Baptist	W 61–52	15–6 (8–2)	CBU Events Center (489); Riverside, CA
February 10, 2022; 6:00 p.m., ESPN+		Utah Valley	L 50–58	15–7 (8–3)	GCU Arena (1,103); Phoenix, AZ
February 12, 2022; 2:00 p.m., ESPN+		Dixie State	W 66–50	16–7 (9–3)	GCU Arena (629); Phoenix, AZ
February 17, 2022; 6:00 p.m., ESPN+		California Baptist	W 75–55	17–7 (10–3)	GCU Arena (501); Phoenix, AZ
February 19, 2022; 2:00 p.m., ESPN+		at New Mexico State	W 46–43	18–7 (11–3)	Pan American Center (723); Las Cruces, NM
February 24, 2022; 6:00 p.m., ESPN+		Chicago State	W 73–55	19–7 (12–3)	GCU Arena (1,016); Phoenix, AZ
February 26, 2022; 3:00 p.m., ESPN+		at Sam Houston State	L 66–69	19–8 (12–4)	Bernard Johnson Coliseum (222); Huntsville, TX
March 3, 2022; 6:00 p.m., ESPN+		at Utah Valley	W 65–63	20–8 (13–4)	UCCU Center (831); Orem, UT
March 5, 2022; 3:00 p.m., ESPN+		at Dixie State	W 65–59	21–8 (14–4)	Burns Arena (547); St. George, UT
WAC tournament
March 11, 2022; 3:30 p.m., ESPN+	(2)	vs. (3) California Baptist; Semifinals	W 64–60	22–8	Orleans Arena; Paradise, NV
March 12, 2022; 3:00 p.m., ESPN+	(2)	vs. (1) Stephen F. Austin; Championship	L 57–74	22–9	Orleans Arena; Paradise, NV
WNIT
March 16, 2022*; 7:00 p.m., MW Network		at New Mexico; First round	L 72–92	22–10	The Pit (2,278); Albuquerque, NM
*Non-conference game. ^{#}Rankings from AP poll. (#) Tournament seedings in parentheses. All times are in Mountain.

== See also ==
- 2021–22 Grand Canyon Antelopes men's basketball team
