= 2021–22 Abilene Christian Wildcats women's basketball team =

Intercollegiate basketball season

2021–22 Abilene Christian Wildcats women's basketball
- Conference: Western Athletic Conference
- Record: 17–13 (9–9 WAC)
- Head coach: Julie Goodenough (10th season)
- Assistant coaches: Erika Lambert; Drew Cole; Sydney Goodson
- Home arena: Teague Center

2021–22 WAC women's basketball standings
	Conf.				Overall
Team	W		L	PCT	W		L	PCT
Stephen F. Austin †	17	–	1	.944	28	–	5	.848
Grand Canyon	14	–	4	.778	22	–	10	.688
California Baptist*	13	–	5	.722	23	–	9	.719
Utah Valley	10	–	8	.556	16	–	15	.516
Abilene Christian	9	–	9	.500	17	–	13	.567
Sam Houston State	9	–	9	.500	15	–	16	.484
Tarleton State*	8	–	10	.444	16	–	13	.552
Lamar	8	–	10	.444	14	–	15	.483
Texas–Rio Grande Valley	8	–	10	.444	14	–	19	.424
Seattle	6	–	12	.333	11	–	19	.367
Dixie State*	6	–	12	.333	10	–	19	.345
New Mexico State	6	–	12	.333	10	–	19	.345
Chicago State	3	–	15	.167	4	–	23	.148
† 2022 WAC tournament winner * ineligible for the 2022 NCAA tournament due to transition from Division II

The 2021–22 Abilene Christian Wildcats women's basketball team represented Abilene Christian University during the 2021–22 NCAA Division I women's basketball season as members of the Western Athletic Conference. The Wildcats, led by tenth-year head coach Julie Goodenough, played their home games at the Teague Center while the Moody Coliseum was undergoing renovation construction.

This season was the Lady Cardinals' first as members of the Western Athletic Conference. Lamar is one of four schools, all from Texas, that left the Southland Conference in July 2021 to join the WAC.

== Previous season ==
The Wildcats finished the season 14–9, 6–7 in Southland Conference play to finish in seventh place. They won their first-round game against tenth seeded Incarnate Word 70–81. Their season ended with a 57–67 loss to sixth seeded Nicholls in the second round of the Southland women's tournament.

== Schedule ==
Date time, TV	Rank^{#}	Opponent^{#}	Result	Record	Site (attendance) city, state
Non-conference regular season (0-0)
Nov 9, 2021*; 6:00 pm, ESPN+		Southwest (NM)	W 99–43	1–0	Teague Center (470); Abilene, TX
Nov 13, 2021*; 6:00 pm, ESPN+		UTSA	W 72–53	2–0	Teague Center (554); Abilene, TX
Nov 17, 2021*; 11:00 am, ESPN+		Angelo State	W 88–53	3–0	Teague Center (902); Abilene, TX
Nov 23, 2021*; 6:30 pm, ESPN+		at Kansas State	L 53–93	3–1	Bramlage Coliseum (2,406); Manhattan, KS
Nov 27, 2021*; 11:00 am		vs. Little Rock; ORU Thanksgiving Tournament	W 66–61	4–1	Mabee Center; Tulsa, OK
Nov 28, 2021*; 11:00 am		vs. Arkansas State; ORU Thanksgiving Tournament	W 81–69	5–1	Mabee Center; Tulsa, OK
Dec 4, 2021*; 1:00 pm		Nicholls	W 97–71	6–1	Stopher Gymnasium (204); Thibodaux, LA
Dec 12, 2021*; 1:00 pm, ESPN+		UNT Dallas	W 92–47	7–1	Teague Center (359); Abilene, TX
Dec 15, 2021*; 5:30 pm, ESPN+		Oral Roberts	L 66–69	7–2	Teague Center (251); Abilene, TX
Dec 19, 2021; 1:00 pm, ESPN+		Northern Colorado	L 58–70	7–3	Teague Center (516); Abilene, TX
Dec 21, 2021; 1:00 pm, ESPN+		McMurry	W 93–35	8–3	Teague Center (298); Abilene, TX
WAC regular season (0-0)
Dec 30, 2021; 1:00 pm, ESPN+		Utah Valley	W 69–63	9–3 (1–0)	Teague Center (364); Abilene, TX
Jan 1, 2022; 1:00 pm, ESPN+		at Dixie State	W 71–53	10–3 (2–0)	Teague Center (385); Abilene, TX
Jan 8, 2022; 3:00 pm, ESPN+		at Sam Houston State	W 70–59	11–3 (3–0)	Bernard Johnson Coliseum (95); Huntsville, TX
Jan 10, 2022; 6:30 pm, ESPN+		at Stephen F. Austin	L 65–81	11–4 (3–1)	William R. Johnson Coliseum (1,201); Nacogdoches, Texas
Jan 13, 2022; 6:00 pm, ESPN+		Grand Canyon	L 69–74	11–5 (3–2)	Teague Center (444); Abilene, TX
Jan 15, 2022; 6:00 pm, ESPN+		New Mexico State	W 76–73	12–5 (4–2)	Teague Center (534); Abilene, TX
Jan 20, 2022; 8:00 pm, ESPN+		at Seattle	L 61–75	12–6 (4–3)	Redhawk Center (236); Seattle, WS
Jan 22, 2022; 3:00 pm, ESPN+		at California Baptist	L 71–77	12–7 (4–4)	CBU Events Center (419); Riverside, CA
Jan 27, 2022; 6:00 pm, ESPN+		Texas–Rio Grande Valley	W 88–69	13–7 (5–4)	Teague Center (629); Abilene, TX
Jan 29, 2022; 1:00 pm, ESPN+		Lamar	W 66–54	14–7 (6–4)	Teague Center (546); Abilene, TX
Feb 5, 2022; 2:00 pm, ESPN+		at Texas–Rio Grande Valley	L 62–82	14–8 (6–5)	UTRGV Fieldhouse (818); Edinburg, TX
Feb 7, 2022; 1:00 pm, ESPN+		at Chicago State	W 75–52	15–8 (7–5)	Emil and Patricia Jones Convocation Center (102); Chicago, IL
Feb 12, 2022; 1:00 pm, ESPN+		Tarleton State	L 67–73	15–9 (7–6)	Teague Center (677); Abilene, TX
Feb 17, 2022; 6:00 pm, ESPN+		Sam Houston State	W 88–71	16–9 (8–6)	Teague Center (507); Abilene, TX
Feb 26, 2022; 1:00 pm, ESPN+		Stephen F. Austin	L 62–80	16–10 (8–7)	Teague Center (722); Abilene, TX
Feb 28, 2022; 6:30 pm, ESPN+		at Lamar	L 60–70	16–11 (8–8)	Montagne Center (1,086); Beaumont, TX
Mar 2, 2022; 8:00 pm, ESPN+		at Dixie State	L 81–95	16–12 (8–9)	Burns Arena (497); St. George, UT
Mar 5, 2022; 2:00 pm, ESPN+		at Tarleton State	W 80–60	17–12 (9–9)	Wisdom Gymnasium (1,123); Stephenville, TX
WAC Tournament (0-0)
March 9, 2022; 2:00 pm, ESPN+	(5)	vs. (8) Texas–Rio Grande Valley	L 70–73	17–13	Orleans Arena; Paradise, NV
*Non-conference game. ^{#}Rankings from AP Poll. (#) Tournament seedings in parentheses. C=Chicago Region. All times are in Central Time.

== See also ==
- 2021–22 Abilene Christian Wildcats men's basketball team
