= 2021–22 Seattle Redhawks women's basketball team =

Intercollegiate basketball season

2021–22 Seattle Redhawks women's basketball
- Conference: Western Athletic Conference
- Record: 11–19 (6–12 WAC)
- Head coach: Suzy Barcomb (6th season)
- Assistant coaches: Cheryl Sorenson; Lexi Petersen; Brittaney Aikens
- Home arena: Redhawk Center

2021–22 WAC women's basketball standings
	Conf.				Overall
Team	W		L	PCT	W		L	PCT
Stephen F. Austin †	17	–	1	.944	28	–	5	.848
Grand Canyon	14	–	4	.778	22	–	10	.688
California Baptist*	13	–	5	.722	23	–	9	.719
Utah Valley	10	–	8	.556	16	–	15	.516
Abilene Christian	9	–	9	.500	17	–	13	.567
Sam Houston State	9	–	9	.500	15	–	16	.484
Tarleton State*	8	–	10	.444	16	–	13	.552
Lamar	8	–	10	.444	14	–	15	.483
Texas–Rio Grande Valley	8	–	10	.444	14	–	19	.424
Seattle	6	–	12	.333	11	–	19	.367
Dixie State*	6	–	12	.333	10	–	19	.345
New Mexico State	6	–	12	.333	10	–	19	.345
Chicago State	3	–	15	.167	4	–	23	.148
† 2022 WAC tournament winner * ineligible for the 2022 NCAA tournament due to transition from Division II

The 2021–22 Seattle Redhawks women's basketball team represented Seattle University during the 2021–22 NCAA Division I women's basketball season. The Redhawks, led by sixth-year head coach Suzy Barcomb, played their home games at the Redhawk Center and were members of the Western Athletic Conference (WAC).

== Schedule ==
Date time, TV	Rank^{#}	Opponent^{#}	Result	Record	Site (attendance) city, state
Exhibition
November 4, 2021*; 6:00 p.m., ESPN+		Central Washington	L 72–78		Redhawk Center; Seattle, WA
Non-conference schedule
November 9, 2021*; 6:00 p.m., ESPN+		Northwest (WA)	W 89–32	1–0	Redhawk Center; Seattle, WA
November 13, 2021*; 2:00 p.m., ESPN+		UC San Diego	L 44–60	1–1	Redhawk Center (388); Seattle, WA
November 18, 2021*; 7:00 p.m., ESPN+		at Long Beach State	L 63–86	1–2	Walter Pyramid (471); Long Beach, CA
November 20, 2021*; 2:00 p.m.		at Sacramento State	W 71–67	2–2	Colberg Court (316); Sacramento, CA
November 25, 2021*; 5:00 p.m.		vs. SMU; South Point Shootout	W 70–66	3–2	South Point Arena (114); Las Vegas, NV
November 26, 2021*; 3:00 p.m.		vs. UTEP; South Point Shootout	L 57–62	3–3	South Point Arena; Las Vegas, NV
December 2, 2021*; 6:30 p.m.		at Boise State	W 63–61	4–3	Taco Bell Arena (427); Boise, ID
December 10, 2021*; 6:00 p.m., ESPN+		Washington	L 59–77	4–4	Redhawk Center (497); Seattle, WA
December 16, 2021*; 6:00 p.m.		at Montana	L 57–83	4–5	Dahlberg Arena (2,131); Missoula, MT
December 18, 2021*; 1:00 p.m.		at Montana State	L 49–76	4–6	Worthington Arena (372); Bozeman, MT
December 20, 2021*; 2:00 p.m., ESPN+		Western Oregon	W 61–38	5–6	Redhawk Center (194); Seattle, WA
WAC conference schedule
December 30, 2021; 5:00 p.m., ESPN+		at New Mexico State	Postponed – game moved to February 8, 2022		Pan American Center; Las Cruces, NM
January 2, 2022; 2:00 p.m., ESPN+		California Baptist	Postponed – game moved to January 17, 2022		Redhawk Center; Seattle, WA
January 6, 2022; 11:00 a.m., ESPN+		Chicago State	Postponed – game moved to January 10, 2022		Redhawk Center; Seattle, WA
January 10, 2022; 1:00 p.m., ESPN+		Chicago State; Game moved from January 6, 2022	L 57–64	5–7 (0–1)	Redhawk Center (217); Seattle, WA
January 13, 2022; 5:00 p.m., ESPN+		at Utah Valley	Postponed – game moved to January 24, 2022		UCCU Center; Orem, UT
January 15, 2022; 2:00 p.m., ESPN+		at Dixie State	L 69–75	5–8 (0–2)	Burns Arena (451); St. George, UT
January 17, 2022; 2:00 p.m., ESPN+		California Baptist; Game moved from January 2, 2022	L 66–76	5–9 (0–3)	Redhawk Center (224); Seattle, WA
January 20, 2022; 6:00 p.m., ESPN+		Abilene Christian	W 75–61	6–9 (1–3)	Redhawk Center (236); Seattle, WA
January 22, 2022; 2:00 p.m., ESPN+		Tarleton State	L 56–57	6–10 (1–4)	Redhawk Center (240); Seattle, WA
January 24, 2022; 1:00 p.m., ESPN+		at Utah Valley; Game moved from January 13, 2022	L 51–65	6–11 (1–5)	UCCU Center (491); Orem, UT
January 27, 2022; 4:30 p.m., ESPN+		at Stephen F. Austin	L 57–76	6–12 (1–6)	William R. Johnson Coliseum (1,293); Nacogdoches, TX
January 29, 2022; 1:00 p.m., ESPN+		at Sam Houston State	L 54–73	6–13 (1–7)	Bernard Johnson Coliseum (262); Huntsville, TX
February 3, 2022; 6:00 p.m., ESPN+		Grand Canyon	L 59–64	6–14 (1–8)	Redhawk Center (234); Seattle, WA
February 5, 2022; 2:00 p.m., ESPN+		New Mexico State	W 81–73 ^{OT}	7–14 (2–8)	Redhawk Center (536); Seattle, WA
February 8, 2022; 4:00 p.m., ESPN+		at New Mexico State; Game moved from December 30, 2021	L 54–59	7–15 (2–9)	Pan American Center (283); Las Cruces, NM
February 10, 2022; 5:00 p.m., ESPN+		at Texas–Rio Grande Valley	L 60–68	7–16 (2–10)	UTRGV Fieldhouse (618); Edinburg, TX
February 12, 2022; 12:00 p.m., ESPN+		at Lamar	W 65–56	8–16 (3–10)	Montagne Center (1,054); Beaumont, TX
February 16, 2022; 6:00 p.m., ESPN+		Texas–Rio Grande Valley	W 71–68 ^{OT}	9–16 (4–10)	Redhawk Center (315); Seattle, WA
February 19, 2022; 1:00 p.m., ESPN+		at California Baptist	L 73–83	9–17 (4–11)	CBU Events Center (467); Riverside, CA
February 24, 2022; 6:00 p.m., ESPN+		Utah Valley	L 61–67	9–18 (4–12)	Redhawk Center (283); Seattle, WA
February 26, 2022; 2:00 p.m., ESPN+		Dixie State	W 69–61	10–18 (5–12)	Redhawk Center (443); Seattle, WA
March 5, 2022; 10:00 a.m., ESPN+		at Chicago State	W 57–54	11–18 (6–12)	Emil and Patricia Jones Convocation Center (137); Chicago, IL
WAC tournament
March 8, 2022; 12:00 p.m., ESPN+	(9)	vs. (8) Texas–Rio Grande Valley; First round	L 61–71	11–19	Orleans Arena (303); Paradise, NV
*Non-conference game. ^{#}Rankings from AP poll. (#) Tournament seedings in parentheses. All times are in Pacific.

== See also ==
- 2021–22 Seattle Redhawks men's basketball team
