= 2021–22 New Mexico State Aggies women's basketball team =

Intercollegiate basketball season

2021–22 New Mexico State Aggies women's basketball
- Conference: Western Athletic Conference
- Record: 10–19 (6–12 WAC)
- Head coach: Brooke Atkinson (4th season)
- Assistant coaches: Aisha Stewart; DeAudra Brown
- Home arena: Pan American Center

2021–22 WAC women's basketball standings
	Conf.				Overall
Team	W		L	PCT	W		L	PCT
Stephen F. Austin †	17	–	1	.944	28	–	5	.848
Grand Canyon	14	–	4	.778	22	–	10	.688
California Baptist*	13	–	5	.722	23	–	9	.719
Utah Valley	10	–	8	.556	16	–	15	.516
Abilene Christian	9	–	9	.500	17	–	13	.567
Sam Houston State	9	–	9	.500	15	–	16	.484
Tarleton State*	8	–	10	.444	16	–	13	.552
Lamar	8	–	10	.444	14	–	15	.483
Texas–Rio Grande Valley	8	–	10	.444	14	–	19	.424
Seattle	6	–	12	.333	11	–	19	.367
Dixie State*	6	–	12	.333	10	–	19	.345
New Mexico State	6	–	12	.333	10	–	19	.345
Chicago State	3	–	15	.167	4	–	23	.148
† 2022 WAC tournament winner * ineligible for the 2022 NCAA tournament due to transition from Division II

The 2021–22 New Mexico State Aggies women's basketball team represented New Mexico State University during the 2021–22 NCAA Division I women's basketball season. The Aggies, led by fourth-year head coach Brooke Atkinson, played their home games at the Pan American Center in Las Cruces, New Mexico and were members of the Western Athletic Conference (WAC). The Aggies finished the season 10–19, 6–12 in WAC play, to finish in three-way tie for tenth place.

== Schedule ==
Date time, TV	Rank^{#}	Opponent^{#}	Result	Record	Site (attendance) city, state
Non-conference regular season
November 9, 2021*; 4:00 p.m., ESPN+		Western New Mexico	W 94–40	1–0	Pan American Center (1,388); Las Cruces, NM
November 13, 2021*; 4:00 p.m., ESPN+		Incarnate Word	W 57–48	2–0	Pan American Center (1,023); Las Cruces, NM
November 17, 2021*; 7:00 p.m.		at UTEP; Battle of I-10	L 61–76	2–1	Don Haskins Center (1,088); El Paso, TX
November 26, 2021*; 1:30 p.m.		vs. LSU; San Juan Shootout	L 52–72	2–2	Coliseo Roberto Clemente (200); San Juan, Puerto Rico
November 27, 2021*; 1:30 p.m.		vs. Tennessee Tech; San Juan Shootout	W 66–54	3–2	Coliseo Roberto Clemente (200); San Juan, Puerto Rico
December 1, 2021*; 6:00 p.m.		UTEP; Battle of I-10	Game postponed due to COVID-19 pandemic-related issues		Pan American Center; Las Cruces, NM
December 3, 2021*; 7:00 p.m., ESPN+		at New Mexico	L 58–77	3–3	The Pit (5,123); Albuquerque, NM
December 5, 2021*; 2:00 p.m., ESPN+		New Mexico	L 66–73	3–4	Pan American Center (754); Las Cruces, NM
December 15, 2021*; 7:00 p.m., ESPN+		UTEP; Rescheduled from December 1, Battle of I-10	L 78–82 ^{OT}	3–5	Pan American Center (637); Las Cruces, NM
December 18, 2021*; 1:00 p.m.		at Weber State	L 63–65	3–6	Dee Events Center (150); Ogden, UT
December 21, 2021*; 12:00 p.m., ESPN+		Houston Baptist	Cancelled due to health and safety protocols within HBU program		Pan American Center; Las Cruces, NM
December 28, 2021*; 2:00 p.m., ESPN+		SAGU American Indian College	W 110–40	4–6	Pan American Center (581); Las Cruces, NM
WAC conference season
December 30, 2021; 6:00 p.m., ESPN+		Seattle	Postponed – game moved to February 8, 2022		Pan American Center; Las Cruces, NM
January 1, 2022; 12:00 p.m., ESPN+		at Chicago State	Postponed – game moved to January 25, 2022		Emil and Patricia Jones Convocation Center; Chicago, IL
January 6, 2022; 6:00 p.m., ESPN+		Lamar	Game postponed due to COVID-19 protocols within Lamar team		Pan American Center; Las Cruces, NM
January 8, 2022; 2:00 p.m., ESPN+		Texas–Rio Grande Valley	Postponed – game moved to January 31, 2022		Pan American Center; Las Cruces, NM
January 10, 2022; 2:00 p.m., ESPN+		Lamar; Game moved from January 6, 2022	W 57–53	5–6 (1–0)	Pan American Center (701); Las Cruces, NM
January 13, 2022; 6:00 p.m., ESPN+		at Tarleton State	L 56–58	5–7 (1–1)	Wisdom Gymnasium (1,002); Stephenville, TX
January 15, 2022; 5:00 p.m., ESPN+		at Abilene Christian	L 73–76	5–8 (1–2)	Teague Center (534); Abilene, TX
January 20, 2022; 6:00 p.m., ESPN+		Sam Houston State	W 72–59	6–8 (2–2)	Pan American Center (251); Las Cruces, NM
January 22, 2022; 12:00 p.m., ESPN+		Stephen F. Austin	Postponed – game moved to February 14, 2022		Pan American Center; Las Cruces, NM
January 25, 2022; 10:00 a.m., ESPN+		at Chicago State; Game moved from January 1, 2022	L 64–67	6–9 (2–3)	Emil and Patricia Jones Convocation Center (75); Chicago, IL
January 29, 2022; 2:00 p.m., ESPN+		at Grand Canyon	L 59–61	6–10 (2–4)	Grand Canyon University Arena (491); Phoenix, AZ
January 31, 2022; 12:00 p.m., ESPN+		Texas–Rio Grande Valley; Game moved from January 8, 2022	W 63–51	7–10 (3–4)	Pan American Center (502); Las Cruces, NM
February 3, 2022; 7:00 p.m., ESPN+		at California Baptist	L 64–92	7–11 (3–5)	CBU Events Center (497); Riverside, CA
February 5, 2022; 3:00 p.m., ESPN+		at Seattle	L 73–81 ^{OT}	7–12 (3–6)	Redhawk Center (536); Seattle, WA
February 8, 2022; 2:00 p.m., ESPN+		Seattle; Game moved from December 30, 2021	W 59–54	8–12 (4–6)	Pan American Center (283); Las Cruces, NM
February 10, 2022; 6:00 p.m., ESPN+		Dixie State	W 84–82 ^{3OT}	9–12 (5–6)	Pan American Center (524); Las Cruces, NM
February 12, 2022; 12:00 p.m., ESPN+		Utah Valley	L 32–66	9–13 (5–7)	Pan American Center (482); Las Cruces, NM
February 14, 2022; 2:00 p.m., ESPN+		Stephen F. Austin; Game moved from January 22, 2022	L 55–69	9–14 (5–8)	Pan American Center (381); Las Cruces, NM
February 17, 2022; 7:00 p.m., ESPN+		at Dixie State	L 69–72	9–15 (5–9)	Burns Arena (452); St. George, UT
February 19, 2022; 2:00 p.m., ESPN+		Grand Canyon	L 43–46	9–16 (5–10)	Pan American Center (723); Las Cruces, NM
February 26, 2022; 2:00 p.m., ESPN+		Chicago State	W 80–71	10–16 (6–10)	Pan American Center (853); Las Cruces, NM
March 3, 2022; 5:30 p.m., ESPN+		at Stephen F. Austin	L 56–64	10–17 (6–11)	William R. Johnson Coliseum (1,423); Nacogdoches, TX
March 5, 2022; 12:00 p.m., ESPN+		at Utah Valley	L 51–60	10–18 (6–12)	UCCU Center (632); Orem, UT
WAC tournament
March 8, 2022; 3:30 p.m., ESPN+	(10)	vs. (7) Lamar; First round	L 54–65	10–19	Orleans Arena (303); Paradise, NV
*Non-conference game. ^{#}Rankings from AP poll. (#) Tournament seedings in parentheses. C=Chicago Region. All times are in Mountain.

== See also ==
- 2021–22 New Mexico State Aggies men's basketball team
