= 2021–22 Texas–Rio Grande Valley Vaqueros women's basketball team =

Intercollegiate basketball season

2021–22 Texas–Rio Grande Valley Vaqueros women's basketball
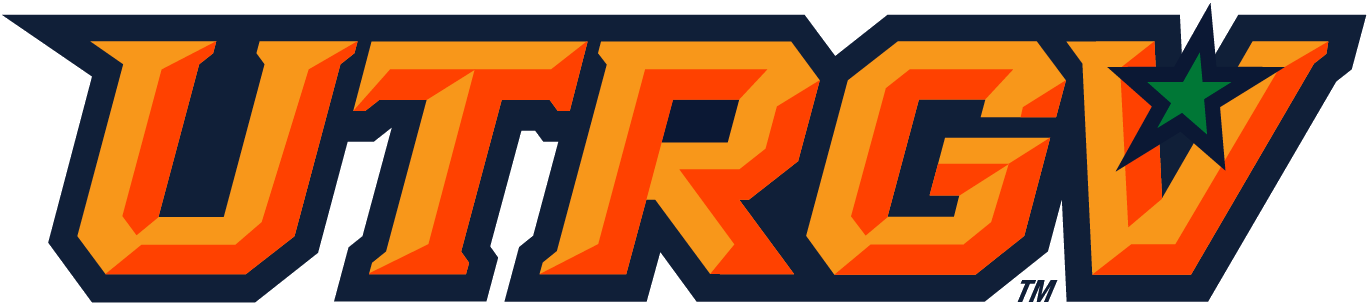
- Conference: Western Athletic Conference
- Record: 14–19 (8–10 WAC)
- Head coach: Lane Lord (4th season)
- Assistant coaches: Kevin Hackerott; Ipek Turkyilmaz; Keanna Keys
- Home arena: UTRGV Fieldhouse

2021–22 WAC women's basketball standings
	Conf.				Overall
Team	W		L	PCT	W		L	PCT
Stephen F. Austin †	17	–	1	.944	28	–	5	.848
Grand Canyon	14	–	4	.778	22	–	10	.688
California Baptist*	13	–	5	.722	23	–	9	.719
Utah Valley	10	–	8	.556	16	–	15	.516
Abilene Christian	9	–	9	.500	17	–	13	.567
Sam Houston State	9	–	9	.500	15	–	16	.484
Tarleton State*	8	–	10	.444	16	–	13	.552
Lamar	8	–	10	.444	14	–	15	.483
Texas–Rio Grande Valley	8	–	10	.444	14	–	19	.424
Seattle	6	–	12	.333	11	–	19	.367
Dixie State*	6	–	12	.333	10	–	19	.345
New Mexico State	6	–	12	.333	10	–	19	.345
Chicago State	3	–	15	.167	4	–	23	.148
† 2022 WAC tournament winner * ineligible for the 2022 NCAA tournament due to transition from Division II

The 2021–22 Texas–Rio Grande Valley Vaqueros women's basketball team represented the University of Texas Rio Grande Valley (UTRGV) during the 2021–22 NCAA Division I women's basketball season. Lane Lord was in his fourth season as UTRGV's head coach. The Vaqueros played their home games at the UTRGV Fieldhouse and were members of the Western Athletic Conference (WAC).

== Schedule ==
Date time, TV	Rank^{#}	Opponent^{#}	Result	Record	Site (attendance) city, state
Exhibition
November 6, 2021*; 6:30 p.m.		Dallas Christian	W 92–42		UTRGV Fieldhouse (511); Edinburg, TX
Non-conference regular schedule
November 9, 2021*; 7:00 p.m., ESPN+		No. 21 South Florida	L 56–63	0–1	Yuengling Center (2,710); Tampa, FL
November 14, 2021*; 2:00 p.m., ESPN+		at Texas A&M–Corpus Christi; South Texas Showdown	L 57–66	0–2	American Bank Center (716); Corpus Christi, TX
November 16, 2021*; 7:00 p.m., ESPN+		at Northern Colorado	L 58–60	0–3	Bank of Colorado Arena (651); Greeley, CO
November 21, 2021*; 2:00 p.m., ESPN+		McNeese State	W 74–70	1–3	UTRGV Fieldhouse (782); Edinburg, TX
November 27, 2021*; 1:00 p.m., ESPN+		Southern Utah	L 67–80	1–4	UTRGV Fieldhouse (728); Edinburg, TX
December 1, 2021*; 7:00 p.m., ESPN+		at Kansas	L 44–75	1–5	Allen Fieldhouse (1,110); Lawrence, KS
December 6, 2021*; 6:00 p.m., ESPN+		Houston Baptist	W 67–58	2–5	UTRGV Fieldhouse (651); Edinburg, TX
December 11, 2021*; 1:00 p.m., ESPN+		Incarnate Word	W 62–57	3–5	UTRGV Fieldhouse (521); Edinburg, TX
December 14, 2021*; 5:00 p.m., ESPN+		Texas A&M–Corpus Christi; South Texas Showdown	W 52–43	4–5	Bert Ogden Arena; Edinburg, TX
December 17, 2021*; 6:00 p.m., ESPN+		vs. UTSA; UTRGV South Padre Island Classic	L 59–66	4–6	South Padre Island Convention Centre (364); South Padre Island, TX
December 18, 2021*; 1:00 p.m., ESPN+		vs. Liberty; UTRGV South Padre Island Classic	L 32–54	4–7	South Padre Island Convention Centre (411); South Padre Island, TX
WAC conference schedule
December 30, 2021; 7:00 p.m., ESPN+		Stephen F. Austin	L 50–65	4–8 (0–1)	UTRGV Fieldhouse (342); Edinburg, TX
January 1, 2022; 2:00 p.m., ESPN+		Sam Houston State	Postponed - game moved to January 24, 2022		UTRGV Fieldhouse; Edinburg, TX
January 6, 2022; 7:00 p.m., ESPN+		at Grand Canyon	W 62–50	5–8 (1–1)	Grand Canyon University Arena (314); Phoenix, AZ
January 8, 2022; 3:00 p.m., ESPN+		at New Mexico State	Postponed - game moved to January 31, 2022		Pan American Center; Las Cruces, NM
January 9, 2022*; 2:00 p.m., LHN		at No. 9 Texas	L 58–93	5–9	Frank Erwin Center (1,956); Austin, TX
January 13, 2022; 6:00 p.m., ESPN+		at Chicago State	W 58–47	6–9 (2–1)	Emil and Patricia Jones Convocation Center (45); Chicago, IL
January 20, 2022; 7:00 p.m., ESPN+		Utah Valley	L 56–59	6–10 (2–2)	UTRGV Fieldhouse (314); Edinburg, TX
January 22, 2022; 2:00 p.m., ESPN+		Dixie State	W 75–68	7–10 (3–2)	UTRGV Fieldhouse (383); Edinburg, TX
January 24, 2022; 6:00 p.m., ESPN+		Sam Houston State; Game moved from January 1, 2022	L 52–66	7–11 (3–3)	UTRGV Fieldhouse (312); Edinburg, TX
January 27, 2022; 6:00 p.m., ESPN+		at Abilene Christian	L 69–88	7–12 (3–4)	Teague Center (629); Abilene, TX
January 29, 2022; 2:00 p.m., ESPN+		at Tarleton State	W 64–58	8–12 (4–4)	Wisdom Gymnasium (1,218); Stephenville, TX
January 31, 2022; 1:00 p.m., ESPN+		at New Mexico State; Game moved from January 8, 2022	L 51–63	8–13 (4–5)	Pan American Center (502); Las Cruces, NM
February 3, 2022; 7:00 p.m., ESPN+		at Lamar	L 39–53	8–14 (4–6)	Montagne Center (1,016); Beaumont, TX
February 5, 2022; 2:00 p.m., ESPN+		Abilene Christian	W 82–62	9–14 (5–6)	UTRGV Fieldhouse (818); Edinburg, TX
February 10, 2022; 7:00 p.m., ESPN+		Seattle	W 68–60	10–14 (6–6)	UTRGV Fieldhouse (618); Edinburg, TX
February 12, 2022; 12:00 p.m., ESPN+		California Baptist	L 78–94	10–15 (6–7)	UTRGV Fieldhouse (527); Edinburg, TX
February 16, 2022; 8:00 p.m., ESPN+		at Seattle	L 68–71 ^{OT}	10–16 (6–8)	Redhawk Center (315); Seattle, WA
February 19, 2022; 3:00 p.m., ESPN+		at Sam Houston State	L 49–69	10–17 (6–9)	Bernard Johnson Coliseum (205); Huntsville, TX
February 24, 2022; 7:00 p.m., ESPN+		Tarleton State	W 64–55	11–17 (7–9)	UTRGV Fieldhouse (512); Edinburg, TX
March 3, 2022; 7:00 p.m., ESPN+		Lamar	L 61–69	11–18 (7–10)	UTRGV Fieldhouse (886); Edinburg, TX
March 5, 2022; 2:00 p.m., ESPN+		Stephen F. Austin	W 76–74	12–18 (8–10)	William R. Johnson Coliseum (1,327); Nacogdoches, TX
WAC tournament
March 8, 2022; 2:00 p.m., ESPN+	(8)	vs. (9) Seattle; First round	W 71–61	13–18	Orleans Arena (303); Paradise, NV
March 9, 2022; 2:00 p.m., ESPN+	(8)	vs. (5) Abilene Christian; Second round	W 73–70	14–18	Orleans Arena; Paradise, NV
March 10, 2022; 2:00 p.m., ESPN+	(8)	vs. (4) Utah Valley; Third round	L 52–72	14–19	Orleans Arena; Paradise, NV Sources:
*Non-conference game. ^{#}Rankings from AP poll. (#) Tournament seedings in parentheses. All times are in Central.

== See also ==
- 2021–22 Texas–Rio Grande Valley Vaqueros men's basketball team
