= Mark Kellogg (basketball) =

American basketball coach (born 1975)

Current position
- Title: Head coach
- Team: West Virginia
- Conference: Big 12
- Record: 78–23 (.772)

Biographical details
- Born: December 8, 1975 (age 50)
- Education: Austin College (BS); West Texas A&M University (MS)

Playing career
- 1994–1998: Austin College
- Position: Guard

Coaching career (HC unless noted)
- 1998–2000: West Texas A&M (men's GA)
- 2001–2005: Montana State (assistant)
- 2005–2012: Fort Lewis
- 2012–2013: Northwest Missouri State
- 2013–2015: West Texas A&M
- 2015–2023: Stephen F. Austin
- 2023–present: West Virginia

Head coaching record
- Overall: 523–143 (.785)
- Tournaments: 2–4 (NCAA D1)

Accomplishments and honors

Championships
- WAC Conference Regular Season Champion; WAC Conference Tournament Champion; Southland Conference Regular Season Champion; Southland Conference Tournament Champion; 2× Lone Star Conference Regular Season Champion; 2× Lone Star Conference Tournament Championship; 2× RMAC tournament Championship; 4× RMAC Regular Season Champion

Awards
- 2022 WAC Coach of the Year; 2021 Southland Coach of the Year; 2014 Lone Star Conference Coach of the Year; 2014 Captain U National Coach of the Year; 2010 RMAC Coach of the Year

Mark Kellogg (born December 8, 1975) is an American basketball coach who is currently the head women's basketball coach at West Virginia University. He was previously the head coach at Stephen F. Austin, West Texas A&M, Northwest Missouri State, and Fort Lewis At the conclusion of the 2022–23 season he ranked third among active women's college basketball coaches with 523 wins.

== Early life and education ==
Kellogg is from Richardson, Texas. He earned his bachelor's degree in communications and physical education from Austin College in 1998 and his master's degree in sport and exercise science from West Texas A&M University in 2000.

== Coaching career ==
Kellogg's first coaching position was as a graduate assistant with the men's basketball team at West Texas A&M from 1998 to 2000. His first job as an assistant with a women's basketball team was in 2001 with Montana State where he remained for four seasons.

=== Fort Lewis ===
Kellogg's first head coaching position was at Fort Lewis College. Under Kellogg the Skyhawks went to five straight Division II NCAA tournaments from 2008 to 2012. His team reached the final 16 in 2009 and lost the championship game in 2010. He won four regular season Rocky Mountain Athletic Conference championships. Over seven seasons his record was 173–46.

=== Northwest Missouri State ===
Kellogg was the head coach at Northwest Missouri State during the 2012–13 season where his Bearcats went 15–13.

=== West Texas A&M ===
Kellogg was the head coach at West Texas A&M for two seasons. His teams won the Lone Star Conference regular season and tournament titles both years. The Lady Buffs were the NCAA Division II runner-up in 2014 and reached the Elite Eight in 2015

=== Stephen F. Austin ===
Kellogg's first NCAA Division I head coaching job was at Stephen F. Austin State University He guided the Ladyjacks to a Southland regular season and conference tournament championship in 2021. When his team moved to the WAC the following year he repeated the feat winning the conference and tournament again. They were knocked out of the NCAA tournament in the first round in both seasons. He took the Ladyjacks to the WNIT in 2018, 2019, and 2023. In eight seasons he compiled a 195–55 record

=== West Virginia ===
Kellogg was announced as the head coach at West Virginia University on April 3, 2023.

== Head coaching record ==
Record table
Season	Team	Overall	Conference	Standing	Postseason
Fort Lewis (Rocky Mountain Athletic Conference) (2005–2012)
2005–06	Fort Lewis	16–13	12–7	1st	
2006–07	Fort Lewis	14–13	11–8	3rd (West)	
2007–08	Fort Lewis	26–4	18–1	1st	NCAA DII 1st Round
2008–09	Fort Lewis	28–4	18–1	1st	NCAA DII Sweet Sixteen
2009–10	Fort Lewis	35–4	18–1	1st	NCAA DII Runner-up
2010–11	Fort Lewis	28–3	20–2	2nd	NCAA DII 1st Round
2011–12	Fort Lewis	26–5	19–3	2nd	NCAA DII 2nd Round
Fort Lewis:		173–46 (.790)	116–23 (.835)		
Northwest Missouri State (Mid-America Intercollegiate Athletics Association) (2012–2013)
2012–13	Northwest Missouri State	15–13	8–10	8th	
Northwest Missouri State:		15–13 (.536)	8–10 (.444)		
West Texas A&M (Lone Star Conference) (2013–2015)
2013–14	West Texas A&M	32–3	15–0	1st	NCAA DII Runner-up
2014–15	West Texas A&M	30–3	16–1	1st	NCAA DII Elite Eight
West Texas A&M:		62–6 (.912)	30–2 (.938)		
Stephen F. Austin (Southland Conference) (2015–2021)
2015–16	Stephen F. Austin	18–12	12–6	4th	
2016–17	Stephen F. Austin	25–8	14–4	4th	
2017–18	Stephen F. Austin	25–7	16–2	2nd	WNIT First Round
2018–19	Stephen F. Austin	25–7	16–2	2nd	WNIT First Round
2019–20	Stephen F. Austin	23–6	16–4	T–2nd	Cancelled
2020–21	Stephen F. Austin	24–3	14–0	1st	NCAA DI First Round
Stephen F. Austin (Western Athletic Conference) (2021–2023)
2021–22	Stephen F. Austin	28–5	17–1	1st	NCAA DI First Round
2022–23	Stephen F. Austin	27–7	15–3	2nd	WNIT Second Round
Stephen F. Austin:		195–55 (.780)	120–22 (.845)		
West Virginia Mountaineers (Big 12 Conference) (2023–present)
2023–24	West Virginia	25–8	12–6	T–4th	NCAA DI Second Round
2024–25	West Virginia	25–8	13–5	T–4th	NCAA DI Second Round
2025–26	West Virginia	28–7	14–4	2nd	NCAA DI Second Round
West Virginia:		78–23 (.772)	39–15 (.722)		
Total:		523–143 (.785)			
National champion Postseason invitational champion Conference regular season champion Conference regular season and conference tournament champion Division regular season champion Division regular season and conference tournament champion Conference tournament champion

== Personal life ==
Kellogg and his wife Trisha have two children named Camden and Kayli
