= 2021–22 Arkansas Razorbacks women's basketball team =

Intercollegiate basketball season

2021–22 Arkansas Razorbacks women's basketball

NCAA tournament, first round
- Conference: Southeastern Conference
- Record: 18–14 (7–9 SEC)
- Head coach: Mike Neighbors (5th season)
- Assistant coaches: Todd Schaefer; Lacey Goldwire; Pauline Love
- Home arena: Bud Walton Arena

2021–22 SEC women's basketball standings
	Conf.				Overall
Team	W		L	PCT	W		L	PCT
No. 1 South Carolina	15	–	1	.938	35	–	2	.946
No. 9 LSU	13	–	3	.813	26	–	6	.813
No. 18 Tennessee	11	–	5	.688	25	–	9	.735
Ole Miss	10	–	6	.625	23	–	9	.719
Florida	10	–	6	.625	21	–	11	.656
Georgia	9	–	7	.563	21	–	10	.677
No. 15 Kentucky †	8	–	8	.500	19	–	12	.613
Missouri	7	–	9	.438	18	–	13	.581
Arkansas	7	–	9	.438	18	–	14	.563
Alabama	6	–	10	.375	20	–	14	.588
Mississippi State	6	–	10	.375	15	–	14	.517
Texas A&M	4	–	12	.250	14	–	15	.483
Vanderbilt	4	–	12	.250	16	–	19	.457
Auburn	2	–	14	.125	10	–	18	.357
† 2022 SEC tournament winner Rankings from AP poll

The 2021–22 Arkansas Razorbacks women's basketball team represented the University of Arkansas during the 2021–22 NCAA Division I women's basketball season. The Razorbacks, led by fifth-year head coach Mike Neighbors, played their home games at Bud Walton Arena and competed as members of the Southeastern Conference (SEC).

== Previous season ==
The Razorbacks finished the season 19–9 (9–6 SEC) to finish tied for fifth place in the conference. The Razorbacks were invited to the 2021 NCAA Division I women's basketball tournament where they lost to Wright State in the First Round.

== Offseason ==
=== Departures ===
Arkansas Departures
Name	Number	Pos.	Height	Year	Hometown	Notes
Destiny Slocum	12	G	5'7"	RS Senior	Meridian, ID	Drafted 14th overall by the Las Vegas Aces
Grayce Spangler	13	G	5'11"	Senior	Fayetteville, AR	Graduated
Jailyn Mason	14	G	5'9"	RS Senior	Mason, OH	Transferred to Rutgers
Taylah Thomas	24	F	6'1"	Senior	Arlington, TX	Transferred to Texas Tech
Macy Weaver	30	F	6'3"	Senior	Davis Junction, IL	Transferred to Southern Miss
Chelsea Dungee	33	G	5'11"	RS Senior	Sapulpa, OK	Drafted 5th overall by the Dallas Wings

=== 2021 recruiting class ===
College recruiting information
Name	Hometown	School	Height	Weight	Commit date
Jersey Wolfenbarger; G/F	Fort Smith, AR	Northside HS	6 ft 5 in (1.96 m)	N/A	
Jersey Wolfenbarger; G/F	Recruit ratings: ESPN: (97)				
Maryam Dauda; F	Bentonville, AR	Bentonville HS	6 ft 4 in (1.93 m)	N/A	
Maryam Dauda; F	Recruit ratings: ESPN: (96)				
Emrie Ellis; F	Ada, OK	Vanoss HS	6 ft 3 in (1.91 m)	N/A	
Emrie Ellis; F	Recruit ratings: No ratings found				
Ashlyn Sage; G	Weatherford, OK	Weatherford HS	6 ft 2 in (1.88 m)	N/A	
Ashlyn Sage; G	Recruit ratings: No ratings found				
Samara Spencer; G	Fort Lauderdale, FL	St. Thomas Aquinas HS	5 ft 9 in (1.75 m)	N/A	
Samara Spencer; G	Recruit ratings: No ratings found				
Overall recruit ranking:
Note: In many cases, Scout, Rivals, 247Sports, On3, and ESPN may conflict in their listings of height and weight.; In these cases, the average was taken. ESPN grades are on a 100-point scale.; Sources:

=== Incoming transfer ===
Arkansas Incoming Transfer
Name	Number	Pos.	Height	Year	Hometown	Previous school
Sasha Goforth	13	G	6'1"	Sophomore	Fayetteville, AR	Oregon State

== Roster ==
2021–22 Arkansas Razorbacks women's basketball team
Players
Coaches

Pos.	#	Name	Height	Year	Previous school	Hometown
G	1	Marquesha Davis	6 ft 0 in (1.83 m)	Jr	Springdale HS	McGehee, AR
G	2	Samara Spencer	5 ft 9 in (1.75 m)	Fr	St. Thomas Aquinas HS	Fort Lauderdale, FL
G	3	Elauna Eaton	6 ft 0 in (1.83 m)	RS Fr	Nettleton HS	Helena, AR
G	4	Erynn Barnum	6 ft 2 in (1.88 m)	RS Jr	Little Rock Central HS	Little Rock, AR
G	11	Rylee Langerman	5 ft 9 in (1.75 m)	So	Christian Heritage Academy	Del City, OK
G	13	Sasha Goforth	6 ft 1 in (1.85 m)	So	Fayetteville HS; Oregon State	Fayetteville, AR
G	15	Ashlyn Sage	6 ft 2 in (1.88 m)	Fr	Weatherford HS	Weatherford, OK
G	22	Avery Hughes	5 ft 7 in (1.7 m)	Jr	Bentonville HS	Bentonville, AR
G	23	Amber Ramirez	5 ft 9 in (1.75 m)	RS Sr	Wagner HS; TCU	San Antonio, TX
G/F	24	Jersey Wolfenbarger	6 ft 5 in (1.96 m)	Fr	Northside HS	Fort Smith, AR
F	25	Destinee Oberg	6 ft 3 in (1.91 m)	Jr	Academy of Holy Angels	Burnsville, MN
F	30	Maryam Dauda	6 ft 4 in (1.93 m)	Fr	Bentonville HS	Bentonville, AR
G	43	Makayla Daniels	5 ft 9 in (1.75 m)	Jr	Frederick HS	Frederick, MD
F	55	Emrie Ellis	6 ft 3 in (1.91 m)	Fr	Vanoss HS	Ada, OK

Head coach

- Mike Neighbors (Arkansas)

Assistant coach(es)

- Todd Schaefer (Thomas More)
- Lacey Goldwire (Oklahoma State)
- Pauline Love (Southern Miss)

Legend

- (C) Team captain
- (S) Suspended
- (I) Ineligible
- (W) Walk-on
- Injured
- Current redshirt

Roster

== Schedule ==
Date time, TV	Rank^{#}	Opponent^{#}	Result	Record	High points	High rebounds	High assists	Site (attendance) city, state
Exhibition
November 5, 2021*; 6:00 pm		Arkansas–Fort Smith	W 114–55		17 – Goforth	9 – Tied	5 – Tied	Bud Walton Arena (2,639); Fayetteville, AR
Non-conference regular season
November 10, 2021*; 7:00 pm, SECN+		Tarleton State	W 85–33	1–0	15 – Daniels	6 – Tied	3 – Langerman	Bud Walton Arena (2,614); Fayetteville, AR
November 12, 2021*; 12:00 pm, SECN+		Arkansas–Pine Bluff	W 96–53	2–0	15 – Barnum	6 – Barnum	4 – Tied	Bud Walton Arena (2,425); Fayetteville, AR
November 14, 2021*; 12:00 pm, SNY		at No. 2 UConn	L 80–95	2–1	20 – Ramirez	8 – Barnum	3 – Daniels	XL Center (9,359); Hartford, CT
November 19, 2021*; 6:00 pm, ESPN+		at Arkansas State	W 94–71	3–1	22 – Daniels	8 – Daniels	5 – Daniels	First National Bank Arena (2,574); Jonesboro, AR
November 22, 2021*; 7:00 pm, SECN+		SMU	W 65–58	4–1	18 – Barnum	9 – Barnum	2 – Tied	Bud Walton Arena (3,060); Fayetteville, AR
November 27, 2021*; 2:00 pm, SECN+		Sam Houston State	W 92–66	5–1	17 – Ramirez	6 – Goforth	6 – Daniels	Bud Walton Arena (3,335); Fayetteville, AR
November 28, 2021*; 7:00 pm, SECN+		Belmont	W 83–63	6–1	15 – Barnum	7 – Barnum	5 – Daniels	Bud Walton Arena (2,834); Fayetteville, AR
December 2, 2021*; 5:00 pm, ESPN+		at UCF	L 51–52	6–2	18 – Daniels	6 – Tied	3 – Tied	Addition Financial Arena (2,777); Orlando, FL
December 5, 2021*; 1:00 pm, SECN+		California	W 84–67	7–2	32 – Daniels	11 – Ramirez	4 – Barnum	Bud Walton Arena (3,100); Fayetteville, AR
December 9, 2021*; 7:00 pm, SECN+		Jackson State	W 66–62	8–2	16 – Daniels	10 – Goforth	4 – Spencer	Bud Walton Arena (2,522); Fayetteville, AR
December 12, 2021*; 4:00 pm, SECN		Little Rock	W 73–39	9–2	14 – Tied	10 – Oberg	5 – Daniels	Bud Walton Arena (3,451); Fayetteville, AR
December 18, 2021*; 1:00 pm, SECN+		vs. Central Arkansas	W 82–44	10–2	17 – Goforth	8 – Langerman	6 – Spencer	Simmons Bank Arena (3,177); North Little Rock, AR
December 21, 2021*; 1:00 pm, SECN+		Creighton	L 72–81	10–3	34 – Daniels	7 – Goforth	3 – Spencer	Bud Walton Arena (3,216); Fayetteville, AR
SEC regular season
January 2, 2022; 12:00 pm, SECN/ESPN2		No. 7 Tennessee	L 63–70	10–4 (0–1)	26 – Ramirez	6 – Tied	2 – Tied	Bud Walton Arena (3,655); Fayetteville, AR
January 6, 2022; 7:30 pm, SECN		at Vanderbilt	L 51–54	10–5 (0–2)	17 – Goforth	11 – Goforth	4 – Spencer	Memorial Gymnasium (194); Nashville, TN
January 9, 2022; 2:00 pm, SECN+		Missouri	W 83–73	11–5 (1–2)	21 – Ramirez	8 – Daniels	4 – Tied	Bud Walton Arena (3,632); Fayetteville, AR
January 16, 2022; 2:00 pm, ESPN2		No. 1 South Carolina	L 52–61	11–6 (1–3)	17 – Daniels	5 – Daniels	2 – Tied	Bud Walton Arena (4,265); Fayetteville, AR
January 20, 2022; 8:00 pm, SECN		at Alabama	W 99–71	12–6 (2–3)	19 – Ramirez	9 – Ramirez	7 – Ramirez	Coleman Coliseum (1,911); Tuscaloosa, AL
January 23, 2022; 3:00 pm, SECN		Mississippi State	W 74–54	13–6 (3–3)	19 – Spencer	11 – Goforth	3 – Tied	Bud Walton Arena (4,177); Fayetteville, AR
January 27, 2022; 7:30 pm, SECN		No. 12 LSU	W 90–76	14–6 (4–3)	25 – Ramirez	6 – Wolfenbarger	4 – Tied	Bud Walton Arena (3,574); Fayetteville, AR
January 31, 2022; 6:00 pm, SECN		at No. 7 Tennessee	L 83–86 ^{OT}	14–7 (4–4)	29 – Ramirez	8 – Ramirez	4 – Spencer	Thompson–Boling Arena (7,071); Knoxville, TN
February 3, 2022; 8:00 pm, SECN		at Texas A&M	L 64–77	14–8 (4–5)	20 – Spencer	11 – Langerman	3 – Spencer	Reed Arena (3,092); College Station, TX
February 10, 2022; 7:00 pm, SECN+		Auburn	W 68–66	15–8 (5–5)	30 – Ramirez	9 – Barnum	2 – Tied	Bud Walton Arena (2,862); Fayetteville, AR
February 13, 2022; 2:00 pm, SECN+		at Missouri	W 88–71	16–8 (6–5)	25 – Ramirez	11 – Wolfenbarger	4 – Spencer	Mizzou Arena (n/a); Columbia, MO
February 17, 2022; 5:00 pm, SECN+		at No. 17 Florida	L 67–76	16–9 (6–6)	19 – Spencer	10 – Ramirez	3 – Spencer	O'Connell Center (1,369); Gainesville, FL
February 20, 2022; 1:00 pm, SECN		Kentucky	L 55–78	16–10 (6–7)	18 – Ramirez	7 – Goforth	5 – Spencer	Bud Walton Arena (8,292); Fayetteville, AR
February 22, 2022; 6:00 pm, SECN+		at Ole Miss	L 62–70	16–11 (6–8)	19 – Spencer	7 – Wolfenbarger	5 – Spencer	SJB Pavilion (1,936); Oxford, MS
February 24, 2022; 7:00 pm, SECN+		No. 25 Georgia	L 62–63	16–12 (6–9)	21 – Daniels	7 – Wolfenbarger	– Tied	Bud Walton Arena (2,726); Fayetteville, AR
February 27, 2022; 5:00 pm, SECN		at Mississippi State	W 87–79	17–12 (7–9)	20 – Goforth	8 – Ramirez	6 – Spencer	Humphrey Coliseum (4,840); Starkville, MS
SEC Tournament
March 3, 2022; 11:00 am, SECN	(8)	vs. (9) Missouri; Second Round	W 61–52 ^{OT}	18–12	15 – Ramirez	14 – Daniels	5 – Daniels	Bridgestone Arena; Nashville, TN
March 4, 2022; 11:00 am, SECN	(8)	vs. (1) No. 1 South Carolina; Quarterfinals	L 54–76	18–13	10 – Spencer	9 – Daniels	3 – Ramirez	Bridgestone Arena; Nashville, TN
NCAA tournament
March 18, 2022; 4:30 pm, ESPNews	(10 S)	vs. (7 S) Utah; First Round	L 69–92	18–14	24 – Ramirez	12 – Barnum	3 – Spencer	Frank Erwin Center; Austin, TX
*Non-conference game. ^{#}Rankings from AP Poll. (#) Tournament seedings in parentheses. All times are in Central Time.

== See also ==
- 2021–22 Arkansas Razorbacks men's basketball team
