= 2021–22 Chicago State Cougars women's basketball team =

Intercollegiate basketball season

2021–22 Chicago State Cougars women's basketball
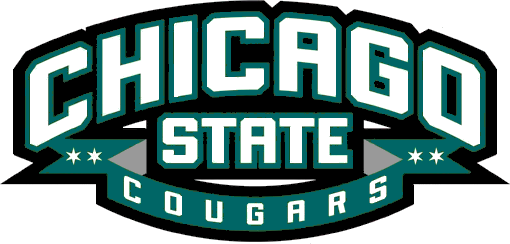
- Conference: Western Athletic Conference
- Record: 4–23 (3–15 WAC)
- Head coach: Tiffany Sardin (2nd season)
- Assistant coaches: Nan Moore; Tiffany Conner; Diana Martinez
- Home arena: Jones Convocation Center (Capacity: 7,000)

2021–22 WAC women's basketball standings
	Conf.				Overall
Team	W		L	PCT	W		L	PCT
Stephen F. Austin †	17	–	1	.944	28	–	5	.848
Grand Canyon	14	–	4	.778	22	–	10	.688
California Baptist*	13	–	5	.722	23	–	9	.719
Utah Valley	10	–	8	.556	16	–	15	.516
Abilene Christian	9	–	9	.500	17	–	13	.567
Sam Houston State	9	–	9	.500	15	–	16	.484
Tarleton State*	8	–	10	.444	16	–	13	.552
Lamar	8	–	10	.444	14	–	15	.483
Texas–Rio Grande Valley	8	–	10	.444	14	–	19	.424
Seattle	6	–	12	.333	11	–	19	.367
Dixie State*	6	–	12	.333	10	–	19	.345
New Mexico State	6	–	12	.333	10	–	19	.345
Chicago State	3	–	15	.167	4	–	23	.148
† 2022 WAC tournament winner * ineligible for the 2022 NCAA tournament due to transition from Division II

The 2021–22 Chicago State Cougars women's basketball team represented Chicago State University in the 2021–22 NCAA Division I women's basketball season. They were led by second-year head coach Tiffany Sardin and played their home games at the Emil and Patricia Jones Convocation Center in Chicago, Illinois as members of the Western Athletic Conference (WAC).

They finished the season 4–23, 3–15 in WAC play, to finish in 13th (last) place.

== Schedule ==
Date time, TV	Rank^{#}	Opponent^{#}	Result	Record	Site (attendance) city, state
Non-conference regular season
November 9, 2021*; 12:00 p.m., ESPN+		at Wichita State	L 34–78	0–1	Charles Koch Arena (1,364); Wichita, KS
November 13, 2021*; 12:00 p.m., ESPN+		at UAB	L 50–81	0–2	Bartow Arena (120); Birmingham, AL
November 17, 2021*; 6:00 p.m., ESPN+		at Western Illinois	L 50–77	0–3	Western Hall (387); Macomb, IL
November 20, 2021*; 12:00 p.m.		at Loyola Chicago	L 59–71	0–4	Joseph J. Gentile Center (372); Chicago, IL
November 22, 2021*; 6:30 p.m.		at Wisconsin	W 71–63 ^{OT}	1–4	Kohl Center (2,139); Madison, WI
November 26, 2021*; 12:00 p.m.		at FIU; Florida International University Thanksgiving Tournament	L 46–64	1–5	U.S. Century Bank Arena (319); Miami, FL
November 27, 2021*; 11:00 a.m.		vs. Delaware; Florida International University Thanksgiving Tournament	L 63–72	1–6	U.S. Century Bank Arena; Miami, FL
December 1, 2021*; 6:00 p.m., ESPN+		Illinois State	L 58–59	1–7	Jones Convocation Center (52); Chicago, IL
December 4, 2021*; 12:00 p.m., ESPN+		St. Thomas (Minnesota)	L 57–62	1–8	Jones Convocation Center (178); Chicago, IL
December 16, 2021*; 7:00 p.m., ESPN+		Green Bay	Canceled due to COVID-19 issues		Jones Convocation Center; Chicago, IL
December 19, 2021*; 1:00 p.m., ESPN+		Evansville	Canceled due to COVID-19 issues		Jones Convocation Center; Chicago, IL
WAC conference season
December 30, 2021; 6:00 p.m., ESPN+		Grand Canyon	L 49–66	1–9 (0–1)	Jones Convocation Center (107); Chicago, IL
January 1, 2022; 1:00 p.m., ESPN+		New Mexico State	Postponed - Game moved to January 25, 2022		Jones Convocation Center; Chicago, IL
January 6, 2022; 1:00 p.m., ESPN+		at Seattle	Postponed - Game moved to January 10, 2022		Redhawk Center; Seattle, WA
January 8, 2022; 3:00 p.m., ESPN+		at California Baptist	L 60–73	1–10 (0–2)	CBU Events Center (673); Riverside, CA
January 10, 2022; 3:00 p.m., ESPN+		at Seattle; Game moved from January 6, 2022	W 64–57	2–10 (1–2)	Redhawk Center (217); Seattle, WA
January 13, 2022; 6:00 p.m., ESPN+		Texas–Rio Grande Valley	L 47–58	2–11 (1–3)	Jones Convocation Center (45); Chicago, IL
January 15, 2022; 1:00 p.m., ESPN+		Lamar	L 47–55	2–12 (1–4)	Jones Convocation Center (100); Chicago, IL
January 25, 2022; 11:00 a.m., ESPN+		New Mexico State; Game moved from January 1, 2022	W 67–64	3–12 (2–4)	Jones Convocation Center (75); Chicago, IL
January 27, 2022; 7:00 p.m., ESPN+		at Utah Valley	L 62–82	3–13 (2–5)	UCCU Center (575); Orem, UT
January 29, 2022; 4:00 p.m., ESPN+		at Dixie State	L 70–82	3–14 (2–6)	Burns Arena (482); St. George, UT
February 2, 2022; 6:00 p.m., ESPN+		Abilene Christian	Postponed – Game moved to February 7, 2022		Jones Convocation Center; Chicago, IL
February 5, 2022; 1:00 p.m., ESPN+		Tarleton State	W 58–48	4–14 (3–6)	Jones Convocation Center (136); Chicago, IL
February 7, 2022; 1:00 p.m., ESPN+		Abilene Christian; Game moved from February 2, 2022	L 52–75	4–15 (3–7)	Jones Convocation Center (102); Chicago, IL
February 10, 2022; 6:30 p.m., ESPN+		at Stephen F. Austin	L 55–84	4–16 (3–8)	William R. Johnson Coliseum (1,329); Nacogdoches, TX
February 12, 2022; 3:00 p.m., ESPN+		at Sam Houston State	L 58–61	4–17 (3–9)	Bernard Johnson Coliseum (248); Huntsville, TX
February 16, 2022; 6:00 p.m., ESPN+		Stephen F. Austin	L 49–73	4–18 (3–10)	Jones Convocation Center (121); Chicago, IL
February 19, 2022; 2:00 p.m., ESPN+		at Tarleton State	L 51–65	4–19 (3–11)	Wisdom Gymnasium (1,326); Stephenville, TX
February 24, 2022; 8:00 p.m., ESPN+		at Grand Canyon	L 55–73	4–20 (3–12)	Grand Canyon University Arena (1,016); Phoenix, AZ
February 26, 2022; 3:00 p.m., ESPN+		at New Mexico State	L 71–80	4–21 (3–13)	Pan American Center (853); Las Cruces, NM
March 2, 2022; 6:00 p.m., ESPN+		California Baptist	L 69–76 ^{OT}	4–22 (3–14)	Jones Convocation Center (115); Chicago, IL
March 5, 2022; 1:00 p.m., ESPN+		Seattle	L 54–57	4–23 (3–15)	Jones Convocation Center (137); Chicago, IL
*Non-conference game. ^{#}Rankings from AP poll. (#) Tournament seedings in parentheses. All times are in Central.

== See also ==
- 2021–22 Chicago State Cougars men's basketball team
