= Sam Houston Bearkats women's basketball =

Women's college basketball team

2026–27 Sam Houston Bearkats women's basketball team
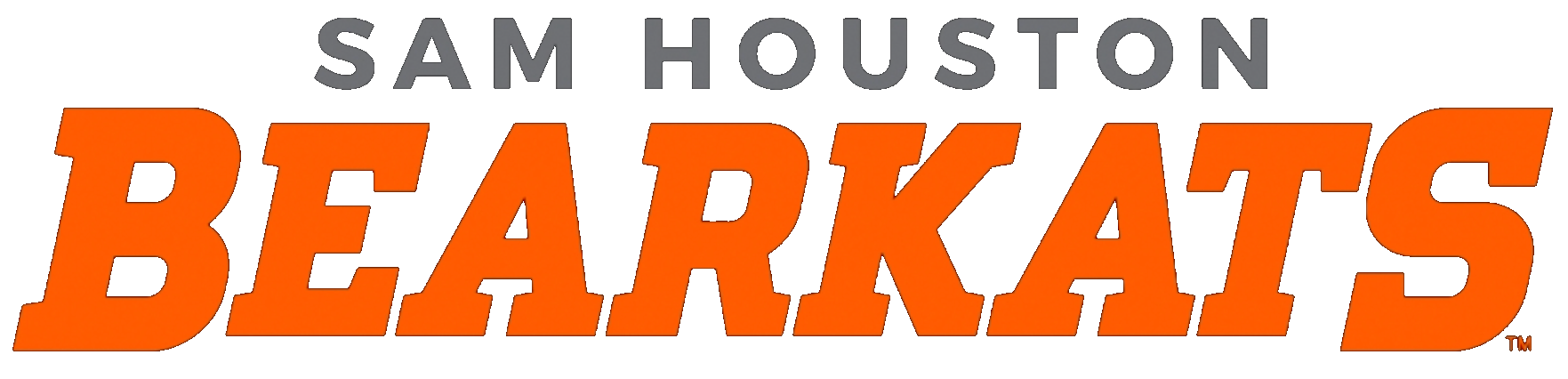
- University: Sam Houston State University
- Head coach: Ravon Justice (9th season)
- Location: Huntsville, Texas
- Arena: Bernard Johnson Coliseum (capacity: 6,100)
- Conference: Conference USA
- Nickname: Bearkats
- Colors: Orange and white

Uniforms
Home	Away

For information on all Sam Houston State University sports, please see Sam Houston Bearkats

The Sam Houston Bearkats women's basketball program is the team playing in women's basketball as they represent Sam Houston State University in Huntsville, Texas. The Bearkats are currently members of Conference USA. Sam Houston joined the Western Athletic Conference on July 1, 2021 after playing the previous 34 seasons in the Southland Conference, the Bearkats played in the WAC until the conclusion of the 2023 season. The Bearkats are currently coached by Ravon Justice.

== History ==
The Bearkats have played basketball since the 1969–70 season. They reached the Southland Tournament finals in 2013 and 2016, losing to Oral Roberts 72–66 and Central Arkansas 69–62, respectively. They played in the TWIAFAF Texas Association of Intercollegiate Athletics for Women (TAIAW) from 1969 to 1982, the Lone Star Conference (Division II) from 1982 to 1984, and the Gulf Star Conference (Division II) from 1984 to 1987 until they settled into the Southland Conference, starting play there in the 1987–88 season. They have reached the WNIT once, in 2013, losing to Tulane 65–57. They also participated in the 2012 Women's Basketball Invitational, beating Rice 73–55 but losing to Northern Iowa 78–69. The most wins the Bearkats have had in one season was 27 in 1981–82, with the most Division I wins being in 1987–88, 1995–96, 2011–12 and 2012–13, with 18. They have a 575–708 all-time record as of the end of the 2015–16 season.

== Postseason history ==
The Bearkats have made two postseason appearances, with one being the Women's Basketball Invitational and one being in the Women's National Invitation Tournament. They have never made the NCAA Tournament.

=== WNIT appearances ===
The Bearkats have appeared in the Women's National Invitation Tournament twice. They have a record of 0–2.

Year	Round	Opponent	Result
2013	First Round	Tulane	L 57–65
2026	First Round	Portland	L 68–78

=== WBI appearances ===
The Bearkats have appeared in the Women's Basketball Invitational (WBI) once. They have a record of 1–1.

Year	Round	Opponent	Result
2012	First Round; Second Round	Rice; Northern Iowa	W 77-55; L 69-78
