= 2021–22 Marshall Thundering Herd women's basketball team =

Intercollegiate basketball season

2021–22 Marshall Thundering Herd women's basketball
- Conference: Conference USA
- East
- Record: 15–13 (10–8 CUSA)
- Head coach: Tony Kemper (5th season)
- Assistant coaches: Janko Popovic; Jenna Burdette; Lexie Barrier
- Home arena: Cam Henderson Center

2021–22 Conference USA women's basketball standings
	Conf.				Overall
Team	W		L	PCT	W		L	PCT
East
Charlotte †	15	–	3	.833	22	–	10	.688
Middle Tennessee	14	–	4	.778	27	–	8	.771
Old Dominion	12	–	6	.667	24	–	10	.706
Western Kentucky	11	–	7	.611	18	–	12	.600
Marshall	10	–	8	.556	15	–	13	.536
FIU	6	–	12	.333	15	–	16	.484
Florida Atlantic	1	–	17	.056	5	–	25	.167
West
Louisiana Tech	11	–	7	.611	21	–	12	.636
North Texas	10	–	7	.588	17	–	13	.567
Southern Miss	9	–	8	.529	18	–	12	.600
Rice	8	–	9	.471	14	–	13	.519
UAB	8	–	10	.444	16	–	15	.516
UTEP	6	–	12	.333	14	–	15	.483
UTSA	3	–	14	.176	7	–	23	.233
† 2022 C-USA tournament winner

The 2021–22 Marshall Thundering Herd women's basketball team represented Marshall University during the 2021–22 NCAA Division I women's basketball season. The Thundering Herd, led by fifth-year head coach Tony Kemper, played their home games at Cam Henderson Center in Huntington, West Virginia as members of the Conference USA. They finished with a record of 15–13, 10–8 in C-USA play to finish in fifth place in the East Division. They lost to Rice in the second round of the C-USA tournament.

== Schedule and results ==
Date time, TV	Rank^{#}	Opponent^{#}	Result	Record	Site (attendance) city, state
Non-conference regular season
November 9, 2021*; 6:00 p.m., ESPN+		Bluefield State	W 108–45	1–0	Cam Henderson Center (467); Huntington, WV
November 14, 2021*; 2:00 p.m., ESPN+		at Radford	W 68–64	2–0	Dedmon Center (745); Radford, VA
November 19, 2021*; 6:00 p.m., ESPN+		Morehead State	W 65–58	3–0	Cam Henderson Center (737); Huntington, WV
November 22, 2021*; 7:00 p.m., BTN+		at Purdue	L 60–70	3–1	Mackey Arena (1,526); West Lafayette, IN
November 28, 2021*; 2:00 p.m., BTN		at Michigan State	L 75–85	3–2	Breslin Center (3,938); East Lansing, MI
November 30, 2021*; 6:00 p.m.		Wright State	Canceled (Note: Game was canceled due to COVID-19 pandemic related issues.)		Cam Henderson Center; Huntington, WV
December 4, 2021*; 1:00 p.m., ESPN+		Coppin State	L 69–77	3–3	Cam Henderson Center (431); Huntington, WV
December 12, 2021*; 12:00 p.m., ESPN+		at St. Bonaventure	L 47–50	3–4	Reilly Center (339); St. Bonaventure, NY
December 15, 2021*; 6:00 p.m., ESPN+		Alderson Broaddus	W 88–56	4–4	Cam Henderson Center (209); Huntington, WV
December 20, 2021*; 8:00 p.m., FloHoops		vs. Oakland; Las Vegas Holiday Hoops Classic	W 79–58	5–4	South Point Arena; Las Vegas, NV
December 21, 2021*; 8:30 p.m.		vs. Akron; Las Vegas Holiday Hoops Classic	Canceled		South Point Arena; Las Vegas, NV
C-USA regular season
December 30, 2021; 6:00 p.m., ESPN+		Louisiana Tech	W 62–44	6–4 (1–0)	Cam Henderson Center (437); Huntington, WV
January 1, 2022; 1:00 p.m., ESPN+		Southern Miss	W 72–55	7–4 (2–0)	Cam Henderson Center (461); Huntington, WV
January 8, 2022; 2:00 p.m., ESPN+		at Florida Atlantic	W 66–51	8–4 (3–0)	FAU Arena (351); Boca Raton, FL
January 13, 2022; 7:30 p.m., ESPN+		at North Texas	L 54–64	8–5 (3–1)	UNT Coliseum (1,052); Denton, TX
January 15, 2022; 3:00 p.m., CUSA.tv		at Rice	W 66–53	9–5 (4–1)	Tudor Fieldhouse (464); Houston, TX
January 20, 2022; 6:00 p.m., ESPN+		FIU	W 62–59	10–5 (5–1)	Cam Henderson Center (610); Huntington, WV
January 22, 2022; 1:00 p.m., ESPN+		Florida Atlantic	W 57–44 ^{OT}	11–5 (6–1)	Cam Henderson Center (651); Huntington, WV
January 27, 2022; 7:00 p.m., CUSA.tv		at Middle Tennessee	L 41–80	11–6 (6–2)	Murphy Center (3,025); Murfreesboro, TN
January 29, 2022; 3:00 p.m., CUSA.tv		at UAB	L 65–77	11–7 (6–3)	Bartow Arena (324); Birmingham, AL
February 3, 2022; 6:00 p.m., ESPN+		Old Dominion	L 47–62	11–8 (6–4)	Cam Henderson Center (412); Huntington, WV
February 5, 2022; 1:00 p.m., ESPN+		Charlotte	L 37–39 ^{OT}	11–9 (6–5)	Cam Henderson Center (613); Huntington, WV
February 10, 2022; 7:00 p.m., CUSA.tv		at FIU	L 66–70	11–10 (6–6)	Ocean Bank Convocation Center (312); Miami, FL
February 13, 2022; 1:00 p.m., ESPN+		UTEP	W 60–48	12–10 (7–6)	Cam Henderson Center (549); Huntington, WV
February 17, 2022; 6:30 p.m., CUSA.tv		at Old Dominion	W 64–48	13–10 (8–6)	Chartway Arena (1,765); Norfolk, VA
February 19, 2022; 4:00 p.m., ESPN+		at Charlotte	L 47–65	13–11 (8–7)	Dale F. Halton Arena (1,015); Charlotte, NC
February 24, 2022; 6:00 p.m., ESPN+		Middle Tennessee	L 57–65	13–12 (8–8)	Cam Henderson Center (573); Huntington, WV
March 2, 2022; 7:30 p.m.		at Western Kentucky	W 80–62	14–12 (9–8)	E. A. Diddle Arena (713); Bowling Green, KY
March 5, 2022; 1:00 p.m., ESPN+		Western Kentucky	W 58–51	15–12 (10–8)	Cam Henderson Center (1,153); Huntington, WV
C-USA Tournament
March 9, 2022; 12:00 p.m., ESPN+	(5E)	vs. (4W) Rice; Second Round	L 62–80	15–13	Ford Center at The Star; Frisco, TX
*Non-conference game. ^{#}Rankings from AP Poll. (#) Tournament seedings in parentheses. All times are in Eastern.

- Source: Marshall University Athletics

== See also ==
- 2021–22 Marshall Thundering Herd men's basketball team
