= 2021–22 UAB Blazers women's basketball team =

American college basketball season

2021–22 UAB Blazers women's basketball
- Conference: Conference USA
- West Division
- Record: 16–15 (8–10 CUSA)
- Head coach: Randy Norton (9th season)
- Associate head coach: Taren Martin
- Assistant coaches: Kayla Alexander; Alison Seberger
- Home arena: Bartow Arena

2021–22 Conference USA women's basketball standings
	Conf.				Overall
Team	W		L	PCT	W		L	PCT
East
Charlotte †	15	–	3	.833	22	–	10	.688
Middle Tennessee	14	–	4	.778	27	–	8	.771
Old Dominion	12	–	6	.667	24	–	10	.706
Western Kentucky	11	–	7	.611	18	–	12	.600
Marshall	10	–	8	.556	15	–	13	.536
FIU	6	–	12	.333	15	–	16	.484
Florida Atlantic	1	–	17	.056	5	–	25	.167
West
Louisiana Tech	11	–	7	.611	21	–	12	.636
North Texas	10	–	7	.588	17	–	13	.567
Southern Miss	9	–	8	.529	18	–	12	.600
Rice	8	–	9	.471	14	–	13	.519
UAB	8	–	10	.444	16	–	15	.516
UTEP	6	–	12	.333	14	–	15	.483
UTSA	3	–	14	.176	7	–	23	.233
† 2022 C-USA tournament winner

The 2021–22 UAB Blazers women's basketball team represented the University of Alabama at Birmingham during the 2021–22 NCAA Division I women's basketball season. The team was led by ninth-year head coach Randy Norton, and played their home games at the Bartow Arena in Birmingham, Alabama as a member of Conference USA.

== Schedule and results ==
Date time, TV	Rank^{#}	Opponent^{#}	Result	Record	Site (attendance) city, state
Exhibition
November 5, 2021*; 6:00 p.m.		Spring Hill	W 85–57		Bartow Arena (317); Birmingham, AL
Non-conference regular season
November 10, 2021*; 6:00 p.m.		Shorter	W 76–45	1–0	Bartow Arena (330); Birmingham, AL
November 13, 2021*; 12:00 p.m., ESPN+		at Chicago State	W 81–50	2–0	Jones Convocation Center (120); Chicago, IL
November 19, 2021*; 11:00 a.m.		Mississippi Valley State	W 76–62	3–0	Bartow Arena (186); Birmingham, AL
November 22, 2021*; 3:00 p.m.		at San Diego State	L 51–55	3–1	Viejas Arena (786); San Diego, CA
November 24, 2021*; 4:00 p.m.		at Pepperdine	L 50–66	3–2	Firestone Fieldhouse (121); Malibu, CA
November 29, 2021*; 6:00 p.m.		Chattanooga	W 67–52	4–2	Bartow Arena (203); Birmingham, AL
December 5, 2021*; 2:00 p.m.		Miles	W 72–52	5–2	Bartow Arena (361); Birmingham, AL
December 12, 2021*; 2:00 p.m., ESPN+		at Samford	L 68–77	5–3	Pete Hanna Center (364); Homewood, AL
December 15, 2021*; 6:00 p.m.		Arkansas–Pine Bluff	W 89–64	6–3	Bartow Arena; Birmingham, AL
December 19, 2021*; 2:00 p.m., ESPN+		at Mercer	L 62–71	6–4	Hawkins Arena (872); Macon, GA
December 21, 2021*; 11:00 a.m.		Grambling State	W 77–43	7–4	Bartow Arena (226); Birmingham, AL
CUSA regular season
December 30, 2021; 7:00 p.m.		at UTEP	W 76–74 ^{OT}	8–4 (1–0)	Don Haskins Center (643); El Paso, TX
January 1, 2022; 2:00 p.m.		at UTSA	L 60–68	8–5 (1–1)	Convocation Center (379); San Antonio, TX
January 6, 2022; 6:00 p.m., ESPN+		North Texas	Postponed (Note: Game was postponed due to COVID-19 pandemic related issues.)		Bartow Arena; Birmingham, AL
January 8, 2022; 2:00 p.m.		Rice	Postponed		Bartow Arena; Birmingham, AL
January 13, 2022; 7:00 p.m.		at FIU	W 65–56	9–5 (2–1)	Ocean Bank Convocation Center; Miami, FL
January 15, 2022; 2:00 p.m.		at Florida Atlantic	W 82–65	10–5 (3–1)	FAU Arena (396); Boca Raton, FL
January 22, 2022; 2:00 p.m.		Louisiana Tech	L 52–58	10–6 (3–2)	Bartow Arena (387); Birmingham, AL
January 27, 2022; 6:00 p.m.		Western Kentucky	W 86–70	11–6 (4–2)	Bartow Arena (412); Birmingham, AL
January 29, 2022; 2:00 p.m.		Marshall	W 77–65	12–6 (5–2)	Bartow Arena (324); Birmingham, AL
February 5, 2022; 5:00 p.m.		at Middle Tennessee	L 55–75	12–7 (5–3)	Murphy Center (3,678); Murfreesboro, TN
February 7, 2022; 2:00 p.m., ESPN+		North Texas; Rescheduled from January 6	L 54–67	12–8 (5–4)	Bartow Arena (207); Birmingham, AL
February 10, 2022; 6:00 p.m.		at Southern Miss	W 68–61	13–8 (6–4)	Reed Green Coliseum (1,524); Hattiesburg, MS
February 13, 2022; 2:00 p.m.		Old Dominion	L 75–81	13–9 (6–5)	Bartow Arena (321); Birmingham, AL
February 17, 2022; 7:00 p.m.		at Rice	L 76–81	13–10 (6–6)	Tudor Fieldhouse (479); Houston, TX
February 19, 2022; 11:30 p.m., ESPN+		at North Texas	L 60–67	13–11 (6–7)	UNT Coliseum (1,446); Denton, TX
February 21, 2022; 5:00 p.m.		Rice	L 55–60	13–12 (6–8)	Bartow Arena (137); Birmingham, AL
February 23, 2022; 6:00 p.m.		UTSA	W 57–50	14–12 (7–8)	Bartow Arena (149); Birmingham, AL
February 26, 2022; 2:00 p.m.		UTEP	W 65–49	15–12 (8–8)	Bartow Arena (363); Birmingham, AL
March 3, 2022; 6:00 p.m.		Southern Miss	L 57–67	15–13 (8–9)	Bartow Arena (312); Birmingham, AL
March 5, 2022; 2:00 p.m.		at Louisiana Tech	L 56–82	15–14 (8–10)	Thomas Assembly Center (2,219); Ruston, LA
CUSA Tournament
March 9, 2022; 1:30 p.m.	(5W)	vs. (4E) Western Kentucky; Second Round	W 74–62	16–14	Ford Center at The Star; Frisco, TX
March 10, 2022; 1:30 p.m.	(5W)	vs. (1W) Louisiana Tech; Quarterfinals	L 65–71	16–15	Ford Center at The Star; Frisco, TX
*Non-conference game. ^{#}Rankings from AP Poll. (#) Tournament seedings in parentheses. All times are in Central.

== See also ==
- 2021–22 UAB Blazers men's basketball team
