= 2021–22 Rice Owls women's basketball team =

American college basketball season

2021–22 Rice Owls women's basketball
- Conference: Conference USA
- West Division
- Record: 14–13 (8–9 CUSA)
- Head coach: Lindsay Edmonds (1st season)
- Assistant coaches: Lakevia Boykin; Nick Grant; Tiffany Morton
- Home arena: Tudor Fieldhouse

2021–22 Conference USA women's basketball standings
	Conf.				Overall
Team	W		L	PCT	W		L	PCT
East
Charlotte †	15	–	3	.833	22	–	10	.688
Middle Tennessee	14	–	4	.778	27	–	8	.771
Old Dominion	12	–	6	.667	24	–	10	.706
Western Kentucky	11	–	7	.611	18	–	12	.600
Marshall	10	–	8	.556	15	–	13	.536
FIU	6	–	12	.333	15	–	16	.484
Florida Atlantic	1	–	17	.056	5	–	25	.167
West
Louisiana Tech	11	–	7	.611	21	–	12	.636
North Texas	10	–	7	.588	17	–	13	.567
Southern Miss	9	–	8	.529	18	–	12	.600
Rice	8	–	9	.471	14	–	13	.519
UAB	8	–	10	.444	16	–	15	.516
UTEP	6	–	12	.333	14	–	15	.483
UTSA	3	–	14	.176	7	–	23	.233
† 2022 C-USA tournament winner

The 2021–22 Rice Owls women's basketball team represented Rice University during the 2021–22 NCAA Division I women's basketball season. The team was led by first-year head coach Lindsay Edmonds, and played their home games at the Tudor Fieldhouse in Houston, Texas as a member of Conference USA.

== Schedule and results ==
Date time, TV	Rank^{#}	Opponent^{#}	Result	Record	Site (attendance) city, state
Non-conference regular season
November 9, 2021*; 5:00 p.m., CUSA.tv		St. Edward's	W 84–41	1–0	Tudor Fieldhouse (328); Houston, TX
November 13, 2021*; 7:00 p.m., CUSA.tv		Louisiana	L 69–73	1–1	Tudor Fieldhouse (462); Houston, TX
November 17, 2021*; 6:00 p.m., CUSA.tv		Texas Southern	W 59–47	2–1	Tudor Fieldhouse (475); Houston, TX
November 20, 2021*; 2:00 p.m., ESPN+		Oklahoma State	L 48–68	2–2	Tudor Fieldhouse (622); Houston, TX
November 24, 2021*; 1:00 p.m., CUSA.tv		Pacific	W 81–73	3–2	Tudor Fieldhouse (529); Houston, TX
December 4, 2021*; 2:00 p.m., ESPN+		at UT Arlington	L 65–73	3–3	College Park Center (680); Arlington, TX
December 11, 2021*; 2:00 p.m., CUSA.tv		Texas A&M–Corpus Christi	W 69–61	4–3	Tudor Fieldhouse (432); Houston, TX
December 16, 2021*; 6:30 p.m., ESPN+		at Sam Houston	W 74–64	5–3	Bernard Johnson Coliseum (204); Huntsville, TX
December 19, 2021*; 2:00 p.m., SEC+		at No. 23 Texas A&M	Canceled (Note: Game was canceled due to COVID-19 pandemic related issues.)		Reed Arena; College Station, TX
December 29, 2021*; 6:00 p.m., CUSA.tv		Texas College	Canceled		Tudor Fieldhouse; Houston, TX
CUSA regular season
January 1, 2022; 2:00 p.m., ESPN+		North Texas	Postponed (Note: Game was postponed due to COVID-19 pandemic related issues.)		Tudor Fieldhouse; Houston, TX
January 7, 2022; 1:00 p.m., ESPN+		at Middle Tennessee	L 63–87	5–4 (0–1)	Murphy Center (1,806); Murfreesboro, TN
January 8, 2022; 2:00 p.m.		at UAB	Postponed		Bartow Arena; Birmingham, AL
January 13, 2022; 7:00 p.m., CUSA.tv		Western Kentucky	L 61–78	5–5 (0–2)	Tudor Fieldhouse (241); Houston, TX
January 15, 2022; 2:00 p.m., CUSA.tv		Marshall	L 53–66	5–6 (0–3)	Tudor Fieldhouse (464); Houston, TX
January 20, 2022; 2:00 p.m., ESPN+		at Old Dominion	L 59–69	5–7 (0–4)	Chartway Arena (1,393); Norfolk, VA
January 22, 2022; 1:00 p.m., ESPN+		at Charlotte	L 83–88 ^{4OT}	5–8 (0–5)	Dale F. Halton Arena (35); Charlotte, NC
January 27, 2022; 7:00 p.m., CUSA.tv		Louisiana Tech	W 72–64	6–8 (1–5)	Tudor Fieldhouse (523); Houston, TX
January 29, 2022; 2:00 p.m., ESPN+		Southern Miss	L 55–78	6–9 (1–6)	Tudor Fieldhouse (538); Houston, TX
February 3, 2022; 7:00 p.m., CUSA.tv		at UTSA	Postponed (Note: Game was postponed due to weather concerns.)		Convocation Center; San Antonio, TX
February 5, 2022; 2:00 p.m., CUSA.tv		at UTEP	W 72–69	7–9 (2–6)	Don Haskins Center (1,165); El Paso, TX
February 10, 2022; 6:30 p.m., ESPN+		at North Texas	L 50–57	7–10 (2–7)	UNT Coliseum (1,353); Denton, TX
February 13, 2022; 2:00 p.m., YouTube		North Texas; Rescheduled from January 1	L 42–55	7–11 (2–8)	Tudor Fieldhouse (374); Houston, TX
February 17, 2022; 7:00 p.m., CUSA.tv		UAB	W 81–76	8–11 (3–8)	Tudor Fieldhouse (479); Houston, TX
February 19, 2022; 2:00 p.m., ESPN+		FIU	W 73–67	9–11 (4–8)	Tudor Fieldhouse (1,869); Houston, TX
February 21, 2022; 5:00 p.m., CUSA.tv		at UAB; Rescheduled from January 8	W 60-55	10-11 (5-8)	Bartow Arena (137); Birmingham, AL
February 24, 2022; 6:30 p.m., ESPN+		at Louisiana Tech	L 80-90 ^{2OT}	10-12 (5-9)	Thomas Assembly Center (1,423); Ruston, LA
February 26, 2022; 12:00 p.m., ESPN+		at Southern Miss	W 51-46	11-12 (6-9)	Reed Green Coliseum (1,421); Hattiesburg, MS
March 3, 2022; 7:00 p.m., ESPN+		UTEP	W 82-62	12-12 (7-9)	Tudor Fieldhouse (342); Houston, TX
March 5, 2022; 2:00 p.m., CUSA.tv		UTSA	W 86-48	13-12 (8-9)	Tudor Fieldhouse (826); Houston, TX
Conference USA Tournament
March 9, 2022; 11:00 a.m., ESPN+		vs. Marshall	W 80-62	14-12	Ford Center at the Star; Frisco, TX
March 10, 2022; 11:00 a.m., Stadium	(4 W)	vs. (1 E) Charlotte	L 53-59	14-13	Ford Center at the Star; Frisco, TX
*Non-conference game. ^{#}Rankings from AP Poll. (#) Tournament seedings in parentheses. All times are in Central.

== See also ==
- 2021–22 Rice Owls men's basketball team
