= 2021–22 UTEP Miners women's basketball team =

American college basketball season

2021–22 UTEP Miners women's basketball
- Conference: Conference USA
- West Division
- Record: 14–15 (6–12 CUSA)
- Head coach: Kevin Baker (5th season)
- Associate head coach: Todd Buchanan
- Assistant coaches: Anthony Anderson; Heather Karner
- Home arena: Don Haskins Center

2021–22 Conference USA women's basketball standings
	Conf.				Overall
Team	W		L	PCT	W		L	PCT
East
Charlotte †	15	–	3	.833	22	–	10	.688
Middle Tennessee	14	–	4	.778	27	–	8	.771
Old Dominion	12	–	6	.667	24	–	10	.706
Western Kentucky	11	–	7	.611	18	–	12	.600
Marshall	10	–	8	.556	15	–	13	.536
FIU	6	–	12	.333	15	–	16	.484
Florida Atlantic	1	–	17	.056	5	–	25	.167
West
Louisiana Tech	11	–	7	.611	21	–	12	.636
North Texas	10	–	7	.588	17	–	13	.567
Southern Miss	9	–	8	.529	18	–	12	.600
Rice	8	–	9	.471	14	–	13	.519
UAB	8	–	10	.444	16	–	15	.516
UTEP	6	–	12	.333	14	–	15	.483
UTSA	3	–	14	.176	7	–	23	.233
† 2022 C-USA tournament winner

The 2021–22 UTEP Miners women's basketball team represented the University of Texas at El Paso during the 2021–22 NCAA Division I women's basketball season. The team is led by fifth-year head coach Kevin Baker, and played their home games at the Don Haskins Center in El Paso, Texas as a member of Conference USA.

== Schedule and results ==
Date time, TV	Rank^{#}	Opponent^{#}	Result	Record	Site (attendance) city, state
Exhibition
November 7, 2021*; 1:00 p.m.		St. Mary's	W 83–45		Don Haskins Center (442); El Paso, TX
Non-conference regular season
November 11, 2021*; 7:00 p.m.		Incarnate Word	W 81–47	1–0	Don Haskins Center (796); El Paso, TX
November 13, 2021*; 1:00 p.m.		North Dakota	W 89–69	2–0	Don Haskins Center (751); El Paso, TX
November 17, 2021*; 7:00 p.m.		New Mexico State; Battle of I-10	W 76–61	3–0	Don Haskins Center (1,088); El Paso, TX
November 20, 2021*; 7:00 p.m.		Northern Arizona	W 72–62	4–0	Don Haskins Center (815); El Paso, TX
November 26, 2021*; 5:00 p.m.		vs. Seattle; South Point Thanksgiving Shootout	W 62–57	5–0	South Point Arena; Enterprise, NV
November 27, 2021*; 5:00 p.m.		vs. Kansas; South Point Thanksgiving Shootout	L 55–81	5–1	South Point Arena; Enterprise, NV
December 1, 2021*; 6:00 p.m.		at New Mexico State; Battle of I-10	Postponed (Note: Game was postponed due to COVID-19 pandemic related issues.)		Pan American Center; Las Cruces, NM
December 4, 2021*; 1:00 p.m.		Utah State	Canceled (Note: Game was canceled due to the COVID-19 pandemic related issues.)		Don Haskins Center; El Paso, TX
December 13, 2021*; 6:00 p.m.		at Texas State	W 69–57	6–1	Strahan Arena (735); San Marcos, TX
December 15, 2021*; 6:00 p.m., ESPN+		at New Mexico State; Battle of I-10	W 82–78	7–1	Pan American Center (637); Las Cruces, NM
December 19, 2021*; 6:00 p.m.		at New Mexico	L 66–78	7–2	The Pit (4,458); Albuquerque, NM
December 21, 2021*; 11:00 a.m.		Air Force	W 93–85 ^{2OT}	8–2	Don Haskins Center; El Paso, TX
CUSA regular season
December 30, 2021; 7:00 p.m.		UAB	L 74–76 ^{OT}	8–3 (0–1)	Don Haskins Center (643); El Paso, TX
January 1, 2022; 1:00 p.m.		Middle Tennessee	W 56–55	9–3 (1–1)	Don Haskins Center (798); El Paso, TX
January 6, 2022; 5:30 p.m.		at Louisiana Tech	Postponed		Thomas Assembly Center; Ruston, LA
January 8, 2022; 1:00 p.m., ESPN+		at Southern Miss	Postponed		Reed Green Coliseum; Hattiesburg, MS
January 13, 2022; 7:00 p.m., ESPN+		Charlotte	L 59–71	9–4 (1–2)	Don Haskins Center (716); El Paso, TX
January 15, 2022; 1:00 p.m.		Old Dominion	W 53–48	10–4 (2–2)	Don Haskins Center (782); El Paso, TX
January 17, 2022; 12:00 p.m., ESPN+		at Southern Miss; Rescheduled from January 8	L 49–55	10–5 (2–3)	Reed Green Coliseum (1,422); Hattiesburg, MS
January 20, 2022; 6:00 p.m., ESPN+		at UTSA	W 69–52	11–5 (3–3)	Convocation Center (547); San Antonio, TX
January 23, 2022; 1:00 p.m.		UTSA	W 71–59	12–5 (4–3)	Don Haskins Center (1,151); El Paso, TX
January 27, 2022; 4:00 p.m.		at Florida Atlantic	L 52–54	12–6 (4–4)	FAU Arena (405); Boca Raton, FL
January 29, 2022; 10:00 a.m.		at FIU	L 45–72	12–7 (4–5)	Ocean Bank Convocation Center; Miami, FL
February 3, 2022; 7:00 p.m., ESPN+		North Texas	W 75–62	13–7 (5–5)	Don Haskins Center (675); El Paso, TX
February 5, 2022; 1:00 p.m.		Rice	L 69–72	13–8 (5–6)	Don Haskins Center (1,165); El Paso, TX
February 7, 2022; 5:30 p.m.		at Louisiana Tech; Rescheduled from January 6	L 65–68	13–9 (5–7)	Thomas Assembly Center (1,302); Ruston, LA
February 13, 2022; 11:00 a.m., ESPN+		at Marshall	L 48–60	13–10 (5–8)	Cam Henderson Center (549); Huntington, WV
February 17, 2022; 7:00 p.m.		Louisiana Tech	L 60–77	13–11 (5–9)	Don Haskins Center (1,012); El Paso, TX
February 19, 2022; 12:00 p.m.		Southern Miss	W 86–79 ^{OT}	14–11 (6–9)	Don Haskins Center (959); El Paso, TX
February 26, 2022; 1:00 p.m.		at UAB	L 49-65	14-12 (6-10)	Bartow Arena (363); Birmingham, AL
March 3, 2022; 6:00 p.m., ESPN+		at Rice	L 62-82	14-13 (6-11)	Tudor Fieldhouse (342); Houston, TX
March 5, 2022; 2:00 p.m.		at North Texas	L 47-56	14-14 (6-12)	UNT Coliseum (2,266); Denton, TX
Conference USA Tournament
March 8, 2022; 4:00 p.m., ESPN+	(6 W)	vs. (7 W) UTSA; First round	L 57-58	14-15	Ford Center at the Star; Frisco, TX
*Non-conference game. ^{#}Rankings from AP Poll. (#) Tournament seedings in parentheses. All times are in Mountain.

== See also ==
- 2021–22 UTEP Miners men's basketball team
