= 2021–22 Old Dominion Monarchs women's basketball team =

American college basketball season

2021–22 Old Dominion Monarchs women's basketball

WNIT, Second Round
- Conference: Conference USA
- East Division
- Record: 24–10 (12–6 C-USA)
- Head coach: DeLisha Milton-Jones (2nd season)
- Assistant coaches: Shammond Williams; Danielle Bell; Roland Jones
- Home arena: Chartway Arena

2021–22 Conference USA women's basketball standings
	Conf.				Overall
Team	W		L	PCT	W		L	PCT
East
Charlotte †	15	–	3	.833	22	–	10	.688
Middle Tennessee	14	–	4	.778	27	–	8	.771
Old Dominion	12	–	6	.667	24	–	10	.706
Western Kentucky	11	–	7	.611	18	–	12	.600
Marshall	10	–	8	.556	15	–	13	.536
FIU	6	–	12	.333	15	–	16	.484
Florida Atlantic	1	–	17	.056	5	–	25	.167
West
Louisiana Tech	11	–	7	.611	21	–	12	.636
North Texas	10	–	7	.588	17	–	13	.567
Southern Miss	9	–	8	.529	18	–	12	.600
Rice	8	–	9	.471	14	–	13	.519
UAB	8	–	10	.444	16	–	15	.516
UTEP	6	–	12	.333	14	–	15	.483
UTSA	3	–	14	.176	7	–	23	.233
† 2022 C-USA tournament winner

The 2021–22 Old Dominion Monarchs women’s basketball team represented Old Dominion University during the 2021–22 NCAA Division I women's basketball season. The team was led by second-year head coach DeLisha Milton-Jones, and played their home games at the Chartway Arena in Norfolk, Virginia as a member of Conference USA.

On October 27, 2021, Old Dominion announced that this will be the last season for the team in the C-USA and become the Sun Belt Conference on July 1, 2022.

== Schedule and results ==
Date time, TV	Rank^{#}	Opponent^{#}	Result	Record	Site (attendance) city, state
Exhibition
November 1, 2021*; 6:30 p.m.		Christopher Newport	W 87–70		Chartway Arena; Norfolk, VA
Non-conference regular season
November 9, 2021*; 6:30 p.m.		South Carolina State	W 80–52	1–0	Chartway Arena (1,649); Norfolk, VA
November 14, 2021*; 2:00 p.m., ESPN+		Auburn	W 57–44	2–0	Chartway Arena (1,776); Norfolk, VA
November 18, 2021*; 6:30 p.m.		George Washington	L 45–47	2–1	Chartway Arena (1,719); Norfolk, VA
November 21, 2021*; 1:00 p.m., ESPN+		at VCU	L 48–71	2–2	Siegel Center (641); Richmond, VA
November 26, 2021*; 12:00 p.m.		vs. Saint Joseph's; Van Chancellor Classic	W 67–50	3–2	Merrell Center; Katy, TX
November 27, 2021*; 2:30 p.m.		vs. Texas Tech; Van Chancellor Classic	W 59–45	4–2	Merrell Center; Katy, TX
November 28, 2021*; 12:00 p.m.		vs. Stetson; Van Chancellor Classic	W 61–51	5–2	Merrell Center; Katy, TX
December 5, 2021*; 2:00 p.m.		at William & Mary; Rivalry	W 68–55	6–2	Kaplan Arena (221); Williamsburg, VA
December 8, 2021*; 6:30 p.m.		Bowie State	W 70–29	7–2	Chartway Arena (1,591); Norfolk, VA
December 12, 2021*; 2:00 p.m.		Norfolk State; Rivalry	W 76–47	8–2	Chartway Arena (1,924); Norfolk, VA
December 18, 2021*; 2:00 p.m.		at Appalachian State	W 85–49	9–2	Holmes Center (204); Boone, NC
December 22, 2021*; 12:00 p.m., ESPN+		at Temple	W 71–68	10–2	Liacouras Center (3,122); Philadelphia, PA
C-USA regular season
December 30, 2021; 6:30 p.m.		FIU	Postponed (Note: Game was postponed due to COVID-19 pandemic related issues.)		Chartway Arena; Norfolk, VA
January 1, 2022; 2:00 p.m.		Florida Atlantic	Postponed		Chartway Arena; Norfolk, VA
January 8, 2022; 2:00 p.m.		Charlotte	Postponed		Chartway Arena; Norfolk, VA
January 13, 2022; 8:00 p.m.		at UTSA	W 57–46	11–2 (1–0)	Convocation Center (UTSA) (455); San Antonio, TX
January 15, 2022; 3:00 p.m.		at UTEP	L 48–53	11–3 (1–1)	Don Haskins Center (782); El Paso, TX
January 17, 2022; 6:30 p.m., ESPN+		Florida Atlantic; Rescheduled from January 1	W 61–48	12–3 (2–1)	Chartway Arena (1,477); Norfolk, VA
January 20, 2022; 3:00 p.m., ESPN+		Rice	W 69–59	13–3 (3–1)	Chartway Arena (1,393); Norfolk, VA
January 22, 2022; 3:00 p.m.		North Texas	W 67–57	14–3 (4–1)	Chartway Arena (558); Norfolk, VA
January 26, 2022; 6:30 p.m., ESPN+		Charlotte; Rescheduled from January 8	L 61–64	14–4 (4–2)	Chartway Arena (1,620); Norfolk, VA
January 29, 2022; 4:00 p.m., ESPN+		at Charlotte	W 54–45	15–4 (5–2)	Dale F. Halton Arena (819); Charlotte, NC
February 3, 2022; 6:00 p.m., ESPN+		at Marshall	W 62–47	16–4 (6–2)	Cam Henderson Center (412); Huntington, WV
February 5, 2022; 3:00 p.m., ESPN+		at Western Kentucky	L 57–71	16–5 (6–3)	E. A. Diddle Arena (1,156); Bowling Green, KY
February 7, 2022; 6:30 p.m.		FIU; Rescheduled from December 30	W 73–61	17–5 (7–3)	Chartway Arena (1,615); Norfolk, VA
February 10, 2022; 6:30 p.m.		Middle Tennessee	W 58–56	18–5 (8–3)	Chartway Arena (1,574); Norfolk, VA
February 13, 2022; 3:00 p.m.		at UAB	W 81–75	19–5 (9–3)	Bartow Arena (321); Birmingham, AL
February 17, 2022; 6:30 p.m.		Marshall	L 48–64	19–6 (9–4)	Chartway Arena (1,765); Norfolk, VA
February 19, 2022; 2:00 p.m.		Western Kentucky	W 75–55	20–6 (10–4)	Chartway Arena (2,085); Norfolk, VA
February 24, 2022; 6:00 p.m.		at Florida Atlantic	W 70-55	21-6 (11-4)	FAU Arena (410); Boca Raton, FL
February 26, 2022; 12:00 p.m.		at FIU	W 81-69	22-6 (12-4)	Ocean Bank Convocation Center (376); Miami, FL
March 2, 2022; 6:30 p.m.		Louisiana Tech	L 62-65	22-7 (12-5)	Chartway Arena (2,373); Norfolk, VA
March 5, 2022; 3:00 p.m.		at Middle Tennessee	L 44-62	22-8 (12-6)	Murphy Center (3,606); Murfreesboro, TN
C-USA Tournament
March 9, 2022; 12:30 p.m.	(3E)	vs. (7W) UTSA; Second Round	W 65–45	23–8	Ford Center at The Star; Frisco, TX
March 10, 2022; 12:30 p.m.	(3E)	vs. (2W) North Texas; Quarterfinals	L 58–65	23–9	Ford Center at The Star; Frisco, TX
WNIT
March 18, 2022; 7:00 p.m.		at Towson; First Round	W 72–66	24–9	SECU Arena (657); Towson, MD
March 20, 2022; 2:00 p.m.		Columbia; Second Round	L 59–62	24–10	Chartway Arena (493); Norfolk, VA
*Non-conference game. ^{#}Rankings from AP Poll. (#) Tournament seedings in parentheses. All times are in Eastern.

- Source: Old Dominion Athletics

== See also ==
- 2021–22 Old Dominion Monarchs men's basketball team
