= 2021–22 North Texas Mean Green women's basketball team =

American college basketball season

2021–22 North Texas Mean Green women's basketball
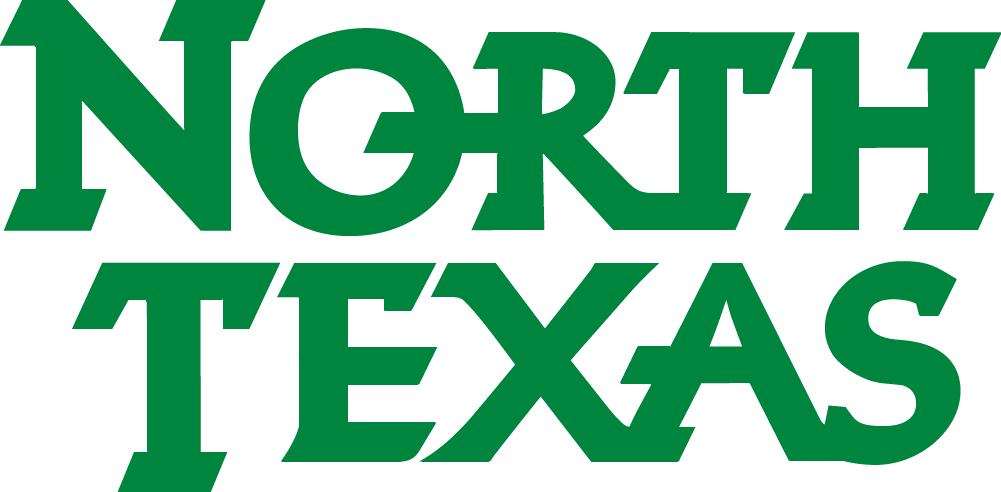

WNIT, first round
- Conference: Conference USA
- West Division
- Record: 17–12 (10–7 C-USA)
- Head coach: Jalie Mitchell (7th season)
- Assistant coaches: Ciara Carl; Durmon Jennings; Kelby Jones
- Home arena: UNT Coliseum

2021–22 Conference USA women's basketball standings
	Conf.				Overall
Team	W		L	PCT	W		L	PCT
East
Charlotte †	15	–	3	.833	22	–	10	.688
Middle Tennessee	14	–	4	.778	27	–	8	.771
Old Dominion	12	–	6	.667	24	–	10	.706
Western Kentucky	11	–	7	.611	18	–	12	.600
Marshall	10	–	8	.556	15	–	13	.536
FIU	6	–	12	.333	15	–	16	.484
Florida Atlantic	1	–	17	.056	5	–	25	.167
West
Louisiana Tech	11	–	7	.611	21	–	12	.636
North Texas	10	–	7	.588	17	–	13	.567
Southern Miss	9	–	8	.529	18	–	12	.600
Rice	8	–	9	.471	14	–	13	.519
UAB	8	–	10	.444	16	–	15	.516
UTEP	6	–	12	.333	14	–	15	.483
UTSA	3	–	14	.176	7	–	23	.233
† 2022 C-USA tournament winner

The 2021–22 North Texas Mean Green women's basketball team represented the University of North Texas during the 2021–22 NCAA Division I women's basketball season. The team was led by seventh-year head coach Jalie Mitchell, and played their home games at the UNT Coliseum in Denton, Texas as a member of Conference USA (C-USA).

== Schedule and results ==
Date time, TV	Rank^{#}	Opponent^{#}	Result	Record	Site (attendance) city, state
Exhibition
November 4, 2021*; 6:30 p.m.		Texas Woman's	W 76–62		UNT Coliseum (1,373); Denton, TX
Non-conference regular season
November 9, 2021*; 5:30 p.m.		USAO	W 93–58	1–0	UNT Coliseum (1,088); Denton, TX
November 11, 2021*; 6:30 p.m., ESPN+		Howard	W 94–56	2–0	UNT Coliseum (1,285); Denton, TX
November 14, 2021*; 1:00 p.m., ESPN3		at Missouri State	L 50–56	2–1	JQH Arena (2,575); Springfield, MO
November 20, 2021*; 3:30 p.m.		UT Arlington	L 74–75	2–2	UNT Coliseum (1,376); Denton, TX
November 26, 2021*; 4:30 p.m.		vs. Montana State; Holiday Beach Classic	W 87–78	3–2	Robert A. Mott Athletics Center (323); San Luis Obispo, CA
November 27, 2021*; 2:00 p.m.		vs. St. Thomas; Holiday Beach Classic	W 81–54	4–2	Robert A. Mott Athletics Center (50); San Luis Obispo, CA
December 3, 2021*; 6:30 p.m., ESPN+		SMU	W 84–58	5–2	UNT Coliseum (1,552); Denton, TX
December 13, 2021*; 11:30 a.m.		Southern	W 65–49	6–2	UNT Coliseum (1,276); Denton, TX
December 17, 2021*; 6:30 p.m., ESPN+		Wichita State	L 64–67	6–3	UNT Coliseum (1,232); Denton, TX
December 21, 2021*; 1:00 p.m.		at Oklahoma State	Canceled (Note: Game canceled due to COVID-19 pandemic-related issues)		Gallagher-Iba Arena; Stillwater, OK
December 29, 2021; 7:00 p.m., ESPN+		at No. 10 Baylor	L 65–86	6–4	Ferrell Center (4,158); Waco, TX
C-USA regular season
January 1, 2022; 2:00 p.m.		at Rice	Postponed (Note: Game postponed due to COVID-19 pandemic-related issues)		Tudor Fieldhouse; Houston, TX
January 6, 2022; 6:00 p.m., ESPN+		at UAB	Postponed		Bartow Arena; Birmingham, AL
January 9, 2022; 12:30 p.m., CUSA.tv		at Middle Tennessee	L 52–80	6–5 (0–1)	Murphy Center (2,842); Murfreesboro, TN
January 13, 2022; 6:30 p.m., ESPN+		Marshall	W 64–54	7–5 (1–1)	UNT Coliseum (1,052); Denton, TX
January 15, 2022; 2:00 p.m., ESPN+		Western Kentucky	L 54–61	7–6 (1–2)	UNT Coliseum (1,005); Denton, TX
January 20, 2022; 5:00 p.m., ESPN+		at Charlotte	L 67–72	7–7 (1–3)	Dale F. Halton Arena (19); Charlotte, NC
January 22, 2022; 2:00 p.m., CUSA.tv		at Old Dominion	L 57–67	7–8 (1–4)	Chartway Arena (558); Norfolk, VA
January 27, 2022; 6:30 p.m., ESPN+		Southern Miss	W 72–66	8–8 (2–4)	UNT Coliseum (1,320); Denton, TX
January 29, 2022; 3:30 p.m., ESPN+		Louisiana Tech	L 60–72	8–9 (2–5)	UNT Coliseum (1,546); Denton, TX
February 3, 2022; 8:00 p.m., ESPN+		at UTEP	L 62–75	8–10 (2–6)	Don Haskins Center (675); El Paso, TX
February 5, 2022; 2:00 p.m., CUSA.tv		at UTSA	W 70–57	9–10 (3–6)	Convocation Center (571); San Antonio, TX
February 7, 2022; 2:00 p.m., ESPN+		at UAB; Rescheduled from January 6	W 67–54	10–10 (4–6)	Bartow Arena (207); Birmingham, AL
February 10, 2022; 6:30 p.m., ESPN+		Rice	W 57–50	11–10 (5–6)	UNT Coliseum (1,353); Denton, TX
February 13, 2022; 2:00 p.m., YouTube		at Rice; Rescheduled from January 1	W 55–42	12–10 (6–6)	Tudor Fieldhouse (374); Houston, TX
February 17, 2022; 6:30 p.m., ESPN+		Florida Atlantic	W 76–45	13–10 (7–6)	UNT Coliseum (1,580); Denton, TX
February 19, 2022; 11:30 a.m., ESPN+		UAB	W 67–60	14–10 (8–6)	UNT Coliseum (1,446); Denton, TX
February 24, 2022; 6:00 p.m., ESPN+		at Southern Miss	Canceled (Note: Game canceled due to inclement weather)		Reed Green Coliseum; Hattiesburg, MS
February 26, 2022; 6:00 p.m., CUSA.tv		at Louisiana Tech	L 54–62	14–11 (8–7)	Thomas Assembly Center; Ruston, LA
March 3, 2022; 6:30 p.m., ESPN+/YouTube		UTSA	W 53–51	15–11 (9–7)	UNT Coliseum (1,587); Denton, TX
March 5, 2022; 2:00 p.m., ESPN+/YouTube		UTEP	W 56–47	16–11 (10–7)	UNT Coliseum (2,266); Denton, TX
C-USA tournament
March 10, 2022; 11:30 a.m., ESPN+	(2W)	vs. (3E) Old Dominion; Quarterfinals	W 65–58	17–11	Ford Center at The Star; Frisco, TX
March 11, 2022; 4:30 p.m., Stadium	(2W)	vs. (1E) Charlotte; Semifinals	L 63–66	17–12	Ford Center at The Star; Frisco, TX
WNIT
March 17, 2022*; 7:00 p.m., ESPN3		Tulsa; First round	L 62–75	17–13	UNT Coliseum (1,021); Denton, TX
*Non-conference game. ^{#}Rankings from AP poll. (#) Tournament seedings in parentheses. All times are in Central.

== See also ==
- 2021–22 North Texas Mean Green men's basketball team
