= 2021–22 Southern Miss Lady Eagles basketball team =

American college basketball season

2021–22 Southern Miss Lady Eagles basketball
- Conference: Conference USA
- West Division
- Record: 18–12 (9–8 C-USA)
- Head coach: Joye Lee-McNelis (18th season)
- Assistant coaches: Jack Trosper; Patosha Jeffery; Kaitlynn Pacholke
- Home arena: Reed Green Coliseum

2021–22 Conference USA women's basketball standings
| | Conf. | | | | Overall |
| Team | W | | L | PCT | W | | L | PCT |
|---|---|---|---|---|---|---|---|---|
East
| Charlotte † | 15 | – | 3 | .833 | 22 | – | 10 | .688 |
| Middle Tennessee | 14 | – | 4 | .778 | 27 | – | 8 | .771 |
| Old Dominion | 12 | – | 6 | .667 | 24 | – | 10 | .706 |
| Western Kentucky | 11 | – | 7 | .611 | 18 | – | 12 | .600 |
| Marshall | 10 | – | 8 | .556 | 15 | – | 13 | .536 |
| FIU | 6 | – | 12 | .333 | 15 | – | 16 | .484 |
| Florida Atlantic | 1 | – | 17 | .056 | 5 | – | 25 | .167 |
West
| Louisiana Tech | 11 | – | 7 | .611 | 21 | – | 12 | .636 |
| North Texas | 10 | – | 7 | .588 | 17 | – | 13 | .567 |
| Southern Miss | 9 | – | 8 | .529 | 18 | – | 12 | .600 |
| Rice | 8 | – | 9 | .471 | 14 | – | 13 | .519 |
| UAB | 8 | – | 10 | .444 | 16 | – | 15 | .516 |
| UTEP | 6 | – | 12 | .333 | 14 | – | 15 | .483 |
| UTSA | 3 | – | 14 | .176 | 7 | – | 23 | .233 |
† 2022 C-USA tournament winner

The 2021–22 Southern Miss Lady Eagles basketball team represented the University of Southern Mississippi during the 2021–22 NCAA Division I women's basketball season. The team was led by 18th-year head coach Joye Lee-McNelis, and played their home games at the Reed Green Coliseum in Hattiesburg, Mississippi as a member of Conference USA (C-USA).

On March 31, 2022, Southern Miss announced that this will be the last season for the team in the C-USA and will join the Sun Belt Conference on July 1, 2022.

== Schedule and results ==
| Date time, TV | Rank^{#} | Opponent^{#} | Result | Record | Site (attendance) city, state |
Exhibition
| November 1, 2021*; 6:00 p.m. | | Southeastern Baptist | W 109–18 | | Reed Green Coliseum (350); Hattiesburg, MS |
Non-conference regular season
| November 9, 2021*; 11:00 a.m. | | William Carey | W 72–42 | 1–0 | Reed Green Coliseum (2,388); Hattiesburg, MS |
| November 13, 2021*; 2:00 p.m. | | Louisiana–Monroe | W 77–60 | 2–0 | Reed Green Coliseum (1,607); Hattiesburg, MS |
| November 17, 2021*; 6:00 p.m., SECN+ | | at Alabama | L 54–86 | 2–1 | Coleman Coliseum (1,784); Tuscaloosa, AL |
| November 20, 2021*; 2:00 p.m. | | Samford | W 71–66 | 3–1 | Reed Green Coliseum (1,555); Hattiesburg, MS |
| November 26, 2021*; 1:00 p.m. | | Arkansas–Pine Bluff; Lady Eagle Thanksgiving Classic | L 57–76 | 3–2 | Reed Green Coliseum (1,410); Hattiesburg, MS |
| November 27, 2021*; 11:00 a.m. | | Mississippi Valley State; Lady Eagle Thanksgiving Classic | W 72–53 | 4–2 | Reed Green Coliseum (1,425); Hattiesburg, MS |
| December 1, 2021*; 4:30 p.m. | | at Georgia State | W 64–56 | 5–2 | GSU Sports Arena (427); Atlanta, GA |
| December 5, 2021*; 3:00 p.m. | | at South Alabama | W 71–51 | 6–2 | Mitchell Center (313); Mobile, AL |
| December 13, 2021*; 6:00 p.m. | | Blue Mountain | W 75–50 | 7–2 | Reed Green Coliseum (1,324); Hattiesburg, MS |
| December 19, 2021*; 1:30 p.m. | | vs. Alabama A&M; FAU Holiday Classic | W 70–55 | 8–2 | FAU Arena (477); Boca Raton, FL |
| December 20, 2021*; 11:00 a.m. | | vs. Richmond; FAU Holiday Classic | L 75–87 | 8–3 | FAU Arena (360); Boca Raton, FL |
C-USA regular season
| December 30, 2021; 6:30 p.m. | | at Western Kentucky | L 88–98 | 8–4 (0–1) | E. A. Diddle Arena (1,222); Bowling Green, KY |
| January 1, 2022; 12:00 p.m. | | at Marshall | L 55–72 | 8–5 (0–2) | Cam Henderson Center (461); Huntington, WV |
| January 9, 2022; 2:00 p.m. | | at Louisiana Tech | W 65–59 | 9–5 (1–2) | Thomas Assembly Center (1,632); Ruston, LA |
| January 13, 2022; 6:00 p.m. | | Louisiana Tech | W 65–60 | 10–5 (2–2) | Reed Green Coliseum (1,329); Hattiesburg, MS |
| January 17, 2022; 1:00 p.m., ESPN+ | | UTEP | W 55–49 | 11–5 (3–2) | Reed Green Coliseum (1,422); Hattiesburg, MS |
| January 22, 2022; 2:00 p.m. | | Middle Tennessee | L 71–81 | 11–6 (3–3) | Reed Green Coliseum (1,611); Hattiesburg, MS |
| January 27, 2022; 6:30 p.m. | | at North Texas | L 66–72 | 11–7 (3–4) | UNT Coliseum (1,320); Denton, TX |
| January 29, 2022; 2:00 p.m., ESPN+ | | at Rice | W 78–55 | 12–7 (4–4) | Tudor Fieldhouse (538); Houston, TX |
| February 3, 2022; 6:00 p.m. | | FIU | W 65–64 | 13–7 (5–4) | Reed Green Coliseum (1,442); Hattiesburg, MS |
| February 5, 2022; 2:00 p.m. | | Florida Atlantic | W 79–60 | 14–7 (6–4) | Reed Green Coliseum (1,535); Hattiesburg, MS |
| February 8, 2022; 6:00 p.m. | | UTSA | W 60–57 ^{OT} | 15–7 (7–4) | Reed Green Coliseum (1,315); Hattiesburg, MS |
| February 10, 2022; 6:00 p.m. | | UAB | L 61–68 | 15–8 (7–5) | Reed Green Coliseum (1,524); Hattiesburg, MS |
| February 17, 2022; 7:00 p.m. | | at UTSA | W 66–50 | 16–8 (8–5) | Convocation Center (587); San Antonio, TX |
| February 19, 2022; 1:00 p.m. | | at UTEP | L 79–86 ^{OT} | 16–9 (8–6) | Don Haskins Center (959); El Paso, TX |
| February 24, 2022; 6:00 p.m. | | North Texas | Canceled (Note: Game was canceled due to inclement weather.) | | Reed Green Coliseum; Hattiesburg, MS |
| February 26, 2022; 12:00 p.m., ESPN+ | | Rice | L 46–51 | 16–10 (8–7) | Reed Green Coliseum (1,421); Hattiesburg, MS |
| March 3, 2022; 6:00 p.m. | | at UAB | W 67–57 | 17–10 (9–7) | Bartow Arena (312); Birmingham, AL |
| March 5, 2022; 1:00 p.m. | | at Charlotte | L 49–70 | 17–11 (9–8) | Dale F. Halton Arena (1,009); Charlotte, NC |
C-USA tournament
| March 9, 2022; 2:00 p.m., ESPN+ | (W3) | vs. (E6) FIU; Second round | W 78–60 | 18–11 | Ford Center at The Star; Frisco, TX |
| March 10, 2022; 2:00 p.m., ESPN+ | (W3) | vs. (E2) Middle Tennessee; Quarterfinals | L 50–70 | 18–12 | Ford Center at The Star; Frisco, TX |
*Non-conference game. ^{#}Rankings from AP poll. (#) Tournament seedings in parentheses. All times are in Central.

== See also ==
- 2021–22 Southern Miss Golden Eagles basketball team
