= 2021–22 Louisiana Tech Lady Techsters basketball team =

American college basketball season

2021–22 Louisiana Tech Lady Techsters basketball

C-USA West Division regular season champions

WNIT, First Round
- Conference: Conference USA
- West Division
- Record: 21–12 (11–7 C-USA)
- Head coach: Brooke Stoehr (6th season)
- Assistant coaches: Scott Stoehr; Bojan Jankovic; Kasondra McKay
- Home arena: Thomas Assembly Center

2021–22 Conference USA women's basketball standings
| | Conf. | | | | Overall |
| Team | W | | L | PCT | W | | L | PCT |
|---|---|---|---|---|---|---|---|---|
East
| Charlotte † | 15 | – | 3 | .833 | 22 | – | 10 | .688 |
| Middle Tennessee | 14 | – | 4 | .778 | 27 | – | 8 | .771 |
| Old Dominion | 12 | – | 6 | .667 | 24 | – | 10 | .706 |
| Western Kentucky | 11 | – | 7 | .611 | 18 | – | 12 | .600 |
| Marshall | 10 | – | 8 | .556 | 15 | – | 13 | .536 |
| FIU | 6 | – | 12 | .333 | 15 | – | 16 | .484 |
| Florida Atlantic | 1 | – | 17 | .056 | 5 | – | 25 | .167 |
West
| Louisiana Tech | 11 | – | 7 | .611 | 21 | – | 12 | .636 |
| North Texas | 10 | – | 7 | .588 | 17 | – | 13 | .567 |
| Southern Miss | 9 | – | 8 | .529 | 18 | – | 12 | .600 |
| Rice | 8 | – | 9 | .471 | 14 | – | 13 | .519 |
| UAB | 8 | – | 10 | .444 | 16 | – | 15 | .516 |
| UTEP | 6 | – | 12 | .333 | 14 | – | 15 | .483 |
| UTSA | 3 | – | 14 | .176 | 7 | – | 23 | .233 |
† 2022 C-USA tournament winner

The 2021–22 Louisiana Tech Lady Techsters basketball team represented Louisiana Tech University during the 2021–22 NCAA Division I women's basketball season. The team was led by sixth-year head coach Brooke Stoehr, and played their home games at the Thomas Assembly Center in Ruston, Louisiana as a member of Conference USA.

== Schedule and results ==
| Date time, TV | Rank^{#} | Opponent^{#} | Result | Record | Site (attendance) city, state |
Non-conference regular season
| November 9, 2021*; 6:30 p.m. | | Jarvis Christian | W 103–53 | 1–0 | Thomas Assembly Center (1,148); Ruston, LA |
| November 12, 2021*; 11:00 a.m. | | Central Baptist Mustangs | Canceled (Note: Game was canceled due to COVID-19 pandemic related issues.) | | Thomas Assembly Center; Ruston, LA |
| November 12, 2021*; 11:00 a.m. | | LSU–Alexandria | W 95–48 | 2–0 | Thomas Assembly Center; Ruston, LA |
| November 19, 2021*; 7:00 p.m., SECN+ | | at Ole Miss | L 44–62 | 2–1 | SJB Pavilion (1,384); Oxford, MS |
| November 22, 2021*; 6:30 p.m. | | Nicholls | W 77–48 | 3–1 | Thomas Assembly Center (1,050); Ruston, LA |
| November 26, 2021*; 3:00 p.m. | | vs. Boise State; Rocky Mountain Hoops Classic | W 60–57 | 4–1 | CU Events Center (212); Boulder, CO |
| November 27, 2021*; 2:00 p.m. | | at Colorado; Rocky Mountain Hoops Classic | L 48–59 | 4–2 | CU Events Center; Boulder, CO |
| December 2, 2021*; 6:30 p.m., ESPN+ | | at Louisiana–Monroe | W 64–48 | 5–2 | Fant–Ewing Coliseum (915); Monroe, LA |
| December 5, 2021*; 2:00 p.m. | | Mississippi Valley State | W 69–59 | 6–2 | Thomas Assembly Center (1,460); Ruston, LA |
| December 10, 2021*; 6:30 p.m. | | Sam Houston | W 77–52 | 7–2 | Thomas Assembly Center (1,737); Ruston, LA |
| December 19, 2021*; 4:00 p.m., ESPN+ | | at Louisiana | L 57–69 | 7–3 | Cajundome (303); Lafayette, LA |
| December 22, 2021*; 6:30 p.m. | | at McNeese State | W 74–57 | 8–3 | The Legacy Center (1,254); Lake Charles, LA |
CUSA regular season
| December 30, 2021; 5:00 p.m., ESPN+ | | at Marshall | L 44–62 | 8–4 (0–1) | Cam Henderson Center (437); Huntington, WV |
| January 1, 2022; 2:00 p.m., CUSA.tv | | at Western Kentucky | L 50–64 | 8–5 (0–2) | E. A. Diddle Arena (526); Bowling Green, KY |
| January 6, 2022; 6:30 p.m. | | UTEP | Postponed (Note: Game was postponed due to COVID-19 pandemic related issues.) | | Thomas Assembly Center; Ruston, LA |
| January 8, 2022; 2:00 p.m. | | UTSA | Postponed | | Thomas Assembly Center; Ruston, LA |
| January 9, 2022; 2:00 p.m. | | Southern Miss | L 59–65 | 8–6 (0–3) | Thomas Assembly Center (1,632); Ruston, LA |
| January 13, 2022; 6:00 p.m., ESPN+ | | at Southern Miss | L 60–65 | 8–7 (0–4) | Reed Green Coliseum (1,329); Hattiesburg, MS |
| January 17, 2022; 1:00 p.m. | | UTSA; Rescheduled from January 8 | W 79–64 | 9–7 (1–4) | Thomas Assembly Center; Ruston, LA |
| January 22, 2022; 2:00 p.m. | | at UAB | W 58–52 | 10–7 (2–4) | Bartow Arena (387); Birmingham, AL |
| January 27, 2022; 7:00 p.m. | | at Rice | L 64–72 | 10–8 (2–5) | Tudor Fieldhouse (523); Houston, TX |
| January 29, 2022; 3:30 p.m., ESPN+ | | at North Texas | W 72–60 | 11–8 (3–5) | UNT Coliseum (1,546); Denton, TX |
| February 3, 2022; 6:30 p.m. | | Florida Atlantic | W 64–49 | 12–8 (4–5) | Thomas Assembly Center (1,352); Ruston, LA |
| February 5, 2022; 2:00 p.m., ESPN+ | | FIU | W 81–62 | 13–8 (5–5) | Thomas Assembly Center (1,348); Ruston, LA |
| February 7, 2022; 6:30 p.m. | | UTEP; Rescheduled from January 6 | W 68–65 | 14–8 (6–5) | Thomas Assembly Center (1,302); Ruston, LA |
| February 10, 2022; 6:30 p.m. | | Charlotte | L 56–59 | 14–9 (6–6) | Thomas Assembly Center (1,319); Ruston, LA |
| February 17, 2022; 8:00 p.m. | | at UTEP | W 77–60 | 15–9 (7–6) | Don Haskins Center (1,012); El Paso, TX |
| February 19, 2022; 2:00 p.m. | | at UTSA | L 49–59 | 15–10 (7–7) | Convocation Center (564); San Antonio, TX |
| February 24, 2022; 6:30 p.m., ESPN+ | | Rice | W 90–80 ^{OT} | 16–10 (8–7) | Thomas Assembly Center (1,423); Ruston, LA |
| February 26, 2022; 2:00 p.m. | | North Texas | W 62–54 | 17–10 (9–7) | Thomas Assembly Center; Ruston, LA |
| March 2, 2022; 5:30 p.m. | | at Old Dominion | W 65–62 | 18–10 (10–7) | Chartway Arena (2,373); Norfolk, VA |
| March 5, 2022; 2:00 p.m. | | UAB | W 82–56 | 19–10 (11–7) | Thomas Assembly Center (2,219); Ruston, LA |
CUSA Tournament
| March 10, 2022; 1:30 p.m. | (1W) | vs. (5W) UAB; Quarterfinals | W 71–65 | 20–10 | Ford Center at The Star; Frisco, TX |
| March 11, 2022; 8:00 p.m. | (1W) | vs. (2E) Middle Tennessee; Semifinals | W 80–72 | 21–10 | Ford Center at The Star; Frisco, TX |
| March 10, 2022; 4:30 p.m. | (1W) | vs. (1E) Charlotte; Championship | L 63–68 | 21–11 | Ford Center at The Star; Frisco, TX |
WNIT
| March 17, 2022*; 6:00 p.m. | | Houston; First Round | L 52–63 | 21–12 | Thomas Assembly Center (1,890); Ruston, LA |
*Non-conference game. ^{#}Rankings from AP Poll. (#) Tournament seedings in parentheses. All times are in Central.

== See also ==
- 2021–22 Louisiana Tech Bulldogs basketball team
