= 2021–22 Charlotte 49ers women's basketball team =

American college basketball season

2021–22 Charlotte 49ers women's basketball
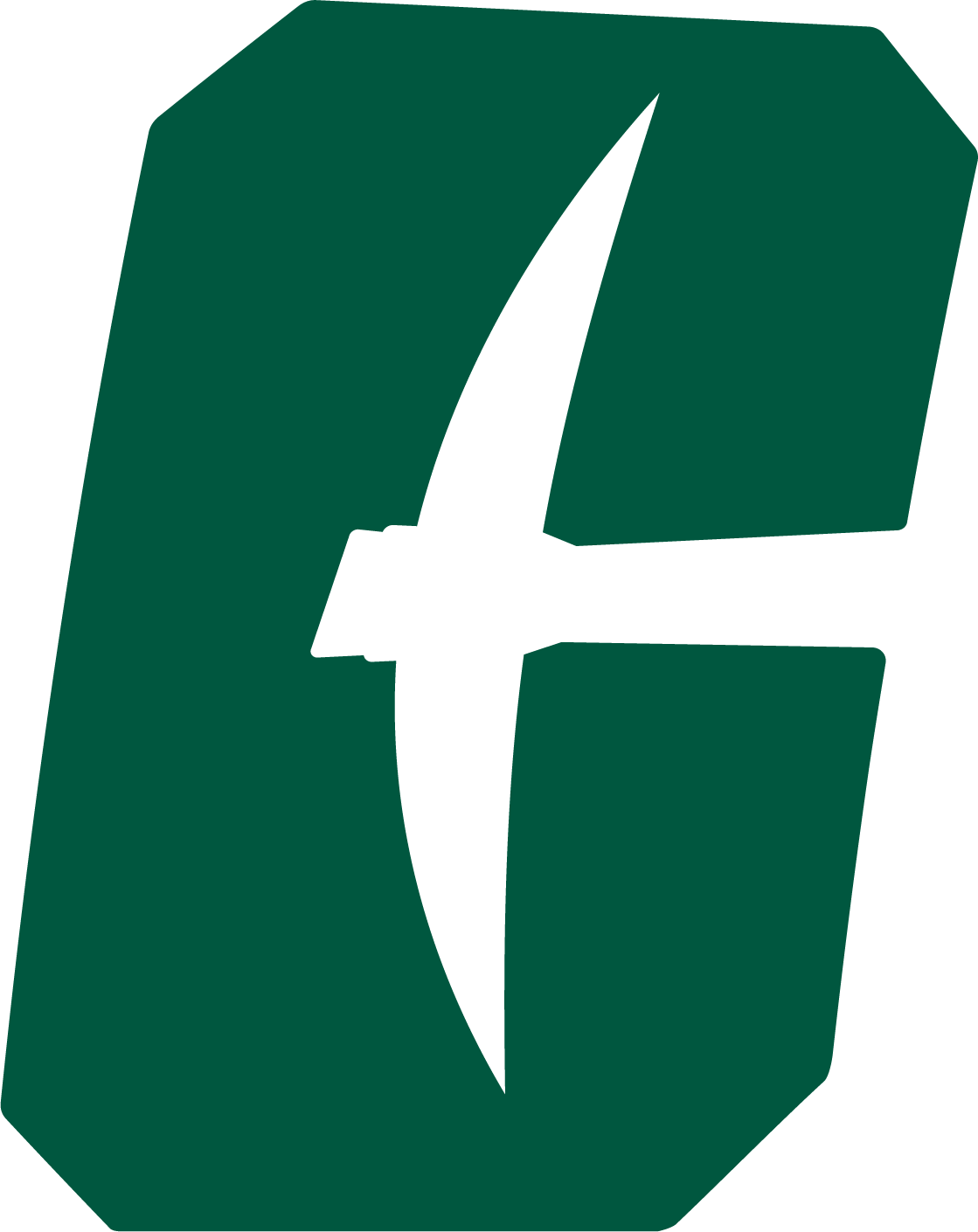

C-USA tournament champions C-USA East Division regular-season champions

NCAA tournament, first round
- Conference: Conference USA
- East Division
- Record: 22–10 (15–3 C-USA)
- Head coach: Cara Consuegra (11th season)
- Assistant coaches: Nicole Woods; Cait Wetmore-Banx; Ciara Gregory
- Home arena: Dale F. Halton Arena

2021–22 Conference USA women's basketball standings
	Conf.				Overall
Team	W		L	PCT	W		L	PCT
East
Charlotte †	15	–	3	.833	22	–	10	.688
Middle Tennessee	14	–	4	.778	27	–	8	.771
Old Dominion	12	–	6	.667	24	–	10	.706
Western Kentucky	11	–	7	.611	18	–	12	.600
Marshall	10	–	8	.556	15	–	13	.536
FIU	6	–	12	.333	15	–	16	.484
Florida Atlantic	1	–	17	.056	5	–	25	.167
West
Louisiana Tech	11	–	7	.611	21	–	12	.636
North Texas	10	–	7	.588	17	–	13	.567
Southern Miss	9	–	8	.529	18	–	12	.600
Rice	8	–	9	.471	14	–	13	.519
UAB	8	–	10	.444	16	–	15	.516
UTEP	6	–	12	.333	14	–	15	.483
UTSA	3	–	14	.176	7	–	23	.233
† 2022 C-USA tournament winner

The 2021–22 Charlotte 49ers women's basketball team represented the University of North Carolina at Charlotte during the 2021–22 NCAA Division I women's basketball season. The team was led by eleventh-year head coach Cara Consuegra, and played their home games at the Dale F. Halton Arena in Charlotte, North Carolina as a member of Conference USA.

== Schedule and results ==
Date time, TV	Rank^{#}	Opponent^{#}	Result	Record	Site (attendance) city, state
Non-conference regular season
November 9, 2021*; 3:00 p.m., ESPN+		at Richmond	W 63–45	1–0	Robins Center (633); Richmond, VA
November 14, 2021*; 3:30 p.m., ESPN+		North Carolina	L 33–89	1–1	Dale F. Halton Arena (2,621); Charlotte, NC
November 18, 2021*; 7:00 p.m., ESPN3		at Wake Forest	L 49–55	1–2	LJVM Coliseum (207); Winston-Salem, NC
November 21, 2021*; 1:00 p.m., FloSports		at Delaware	L 57–73	1–3	Bob Carpenter Center; Newark, DE
November 26, 2021*; 5:00 p.m., FloSports		vs. No. 13 Iowa State; Gulf Coast Showcase	L 59–75	1–4	Hertz Arena (276); Estero, FL
November 27, 2021*; 1:30 p.m.		vs. St. John's; Gulf Coast Showcase	W 82–64	2–4	Hertz Arena (200); Estero, FL
November 28, 2021*; 1:30 p.m.		vs. South Dakota State; Gulf Coast Showcase	Canceled (Note: Game was canceled due to a medical emergency with the South Dakota State team.)		Hertz Arena; Estero, FL
December 3, 2021*; 6:00 p.m.		Gardner–Webb	W 79–57	3–4	Dale F. Halton Arena (619); Charlotte, NC
December 7, 2021*; 7:00 p.m., ESPN+		at West Virginia	L 54–65	3–5	WVU Coliseum (1,205); Morgantown, WV
December 19, 2021*; 4:00 p.m.		Winthrop	W 78–42	4–5	Dale F. Halton Arena (150); Charlotte, NC
December 22, 2021*; 2:30 p.m.		Davidson	L 65–79	4–6	Dale F. Halton Arena (2,511); Charlotte, NC
C-USA regular season
December 30, 2021; 6:00 p.m.		Florida Atlantic	Postponed (Note: Game was postponed due to COVID-19 pandemic-related issues.)		Dale F. Halton Arena; Charlotte, NC
January 1, 2022; 4:00 p.m.		FIU	Postponed		Dale F. Halton Arena; Charlotte, NC
January 8, 2022; 2:00 p.m.		at Old Dominion	Postponed		Chartway Arena; Norfolk, VA
January 13, 2022; 9:00 p.m., ESPN+		at UTEP	W 71–59	5–6 (1–0)	Don Haskins Center (716); El Paso, TX
January 15, 2022; 1:00 p.m., ESPN+		at UTSA	W 58–33	6–6 (2–0)	Convocation Center (471); San Antonio, TX
January 20, 2022; 6:00 p.m., ESPN+		North Texas	W 72–67	7–6 (3–0)	Dale F. Halton Arena (19); Charlotte, NC
January 22, 2022; 2:00 p.m., ESPN+		Rice	W 88–83 ^{4OT}	8–6 (4–0)	Dale F. Halton Arena (35); Charlotte, NC
January 26, 2022; 6:30 p.m., ESPN+		at Old Dominion; Rescheduled from January 8	W 64–61	9–6 (5–0)	Chartway Arena (1,620); Norfolk, VA
January 29, 2022; 4:00 p.m., ESPN+		Old Dominion	L 45–54	9–7 (5–1)	Dale F. Halton Arena (819); Charlotte, NC
February 3, 2022; 3:00 p.m., ESPN+		at Western Kentucky	W 79–74 ^{OT}	10–7 (6–1)	E. A. Diddle Arena (386); Bowling Green, KY
February 5, 2022; 1:00 p.m., ESPN+		at Marshall	W 39–37 ^{OT}	11–7 (7–1)	Cam Henderson Center (613); Huntington, WV
February 7, 2022; 5:00 p.m.		Florida Atlantic; Rescheduled from December 30	W 57–55	12–7 (8–1)	Dale F. Halton Arena (333); Charlotte, NC
February 10, 2022; 7:30 p.m.		at Louisiana Tech	W 59–56	13–7 (9–1)	Thomas Assembly Center (1,319); Ruston, LA
February 13, 2022; 1:00 p.m., ESPN+		Middle Tennessee	L 45–46	13–8 (9–2)	Dale F. Halton Arena (556); Charlotte, NC
February 17, 2022; 6:00 p.m., ESPN+		Western Kentucky	W 89–43	14–8 (10–2)	Dale F. Halton Arena (745); Charlotte, NC
February 19, 2022; 4:00 p.m., ESPN+		Marshall	W 65–47	15–8 (11–2)	Dale F. Halton Arena (1,015); Charlotte, NC
February 21, 2022; 5:30 p.m.		FIU; Rescheduled from January 1	W 53–41	16–8 (12–2)	Dale F. Halton Arena; Charlotte, NC
February 24, 2022; 7:00 p.m.		at FIU	W 65–55	17–8 (13–2)	Ocean Bank Convocation Center; Miami, FL
February 26, 2022; 12:00 p.m., ESPN+		at Florida Atlantic	W 76–47	18–8 (14–2)	FAU Arena; Boca Raton, FL
March 2, 2022; 7:00 p.m., ESPN+		at Middle Tennessee	L 65–72	18–9 (14–3)	Murphy Center; Murfreesboro, TN
March 5, 2022; 2:00 p.m., CUSA.TV		Southern Miss	W 70–49	19–9 (15–3)	Dale F. Halton Arena; Charlotte, NC
C-USA tournament
March 10, 2022; 12:00 p.m., Stadium	(1 E)	vs. (4 W) Rice	W 59–53	20–9	Ford Center at the Star; Frisco, TX
March 11, 2022; 5:30 p.m., Stadium	(1 E)	vs. (2 W) North Texas	W 66–63	21–9	Ford Center at the Star; Frisco, TX
March 12, 2022; 5:30 p.m., CBSSN	(1 E)	vs. (1 W) Louisiana Tech	W 68–63	22–9	Ford Center at the Star; Frisco, TX
NCAA tournament
March 19, 2022; 1:30 p.m., ESPN2	(13 B)	at (4 B) No. 11 Indiana	L 51–85	22–10	Simon Skjodt Assembly Hall; Bloomington, IN
*Non-conference game. ^{#}Rankings from AP poll. (#) Tournament seedings in parentheses. All times are in Eastern.

== See also ==
- 2021–22 Charlotte 49ers men's basketball team
