= 2021–22 UTSA Roadrunners women's basketball team =

American college basketball season

2021–22 UTSA Roadrunners women's basketball
- Conference: Conference USA
- West Division
- Record: 7-23 (3–11 CUSA)
- Head coach: Karen Aston (1st season)
- Associate head coach: Jamie Carey
- Assistant coaches: Empress Davenport; Cameron Miles
- Home arena: Convocation Center

2021–22 Conference USA women's basketball standings
	Conf.				Overall
Team	W		L	PCT	W		L	PCT
East
Charlotte †	15	–	3	.833	22	–	10	.688
Middle Tennessee	14	–	4	.778	27	–	8	.771
Old Dominion	12	–	6	.667	24	–	10	.706
Western Kentucky	11	–	7	.611	18	–	12	.600
Marshall	10	–	8	.556	15	–	13	.536
FIU	6	–	12	.333	15	–	16	.484
Florida Atlantic	1	–	17	.056	5	–	25	.167
West
Louisiana Tech	11	–	7	.611	21	–	12	.636
North Texas	10	–	7	.588	17	–	13	.567
Southern Miss	9	–	8	.529	18	–	12	.600
Rice	8	–	9	.471	14	–	13	.519
UAB	8	–	10	.444	16	–	15	.516
UTEP	6	–	12	.333	14	–	15	.483
UTSA	3	–	14	.176	7	–	23	.233
† 2022 C-USA tournament winner

The 2021–22 UTSA Roadrunners women's basketball team represented the University of Texas at San Antonio during the 2021–22 NCAA Division I women's basketball season. The team was led by first-year head coach Karen Aston, and played their home games at the Convocation Center in San Antonio, Texas as a member of Conference USA.

== Schedule and results ==
Date time, TV	Rank^{#}	Opponent^{#}	Result	Record	Site (attendance) city, state
Non-conference regular season
November 9, 2021*; 5:00 p.m.		Stephen F. Austin	L 50–77	0–1	Convocation Center (541); San Antonio, TX
November 13, 2021*; 6:00 p.m., ESPN+		at Abilene Christian	L 53–72	0–2	Teague Center (554); Abilene, TX
November 18, 2021*; 7:00 p.m.		Texas State; I-35 Rivalry	L 62–76	0–3	Convocation Center (608); San Antonio, TX
November 21, 2021*; 12:00 p.m.		Incarnate Word	W 66–60	1–3	Convocation Center (394); San Antonio, TX
November 28, 2021*; 2:00 p.m., BTN+		at Minnesota	L 52–81	1–4	Williams Arena (3,150); Minneapolis, MN
December 4, 2021*; 2:00 p.m.		at Arizona State; ASU Classic	L 44–68	1–5	Desert Financial Arena (1,700); Tempe, AZ
December 5, 2021*; 3:30 p.m.		vs. Colorado State; ASU Classic	L 48–52	1–6	Desert Financial Arena (1,530); Tempe, AZ
December 13, 2021*; 7:00 p.m.		Dartmouth	W 49–39	2–6	Convocation Center (458); San Antonio, TX
December 17, 2021*; 6:00 p.m., ESPN+		at UTRGV; UTRGV South Padre Island Classic	W 66–59	3–6	South Padre Island Convention Centre (364); South Padre Island, TX
December 18, 2021*; 4:00 p.m., ESPN+		vs. Grand Canyon; UTRGV South Padre Island Classic	L 52–62	3–7	South Padre Island Convention Centre (411); South Padre Island, TX
December 20, 2021*; 2:00 p.m., SEC+		at No. 23 Texas A&M	L 51–77	3–8	Reed Arena (3,391); College Station, TX
CUSA regular season
December 30, 2021; 7:00 p.m.		Middle Tennessee	L 56–85	3–9 (0–1)	Convocation Center (317); San Antonio, TX
January 1, 2022; 2:00 p.m.		UAB	W 68–60 ^{OT}	4–9 (1–1)	Convocation Center (379); San Antonio, TX
January 6, 2022; 6:00 p.m., ESPN+		at Southern Miss	Postponed (Note: Game was postponed due to COVID-19 pandemic related issues.)		Reed Green Coliseum; Hattiesburg, MS
January 8, 2022; 2:00 p.m.		at Louisiana Tech	Postponed		Thomas Assembly Center; Ruston, LA
January 13, 2022; 7:00 p.m.		Old Dominion	L 46–57	4–10 (1–2)	Convocation Center (455); San Antonio, TX
January 15, 2022; 12:00 p.m., ESPN+		Charlotte	L 33–58	4–11 (1–3)	Convocation Center (471); San Antonio, TX
January 17, 2022; 1:00 p.m.		at Louisiana Tech; Rescheduled from January 8	L 64–79	4–12 (1–4)	Thomas Assembly Center; Ruston, LA
January 20, 2022; 7:00 p.m., ESPN+		UTEP	L 52–69	4–13 (1–5)	Convocation Center (547); San Antonio, TX
January 23, 2022; 2:00 p.m.		at UTEP	L 59–71	4–14 (1–6)	Don Haskins Center (1,151); El Paso, TX
January 27, 2022; 6:00 p.m.		at FIU	L 53–81	4–15 (1–7)	Ocean Bank Convocation Center (203); Miami, FL
January 29, 2022; 1:00 p.m.		at Florida Atlantic	W 49–44	5–15 (2–7)	FAU Arena (577); Boca Raton, FL
February 3, 2022; 7:00 p.m.		Rice	Postponed (Note: Game was postponed due to weather concerns.)		Convocation Center; San Antonio, TX
February 5, 2022; 2:00 p.m.		North Texas	L 57–70	5–16 (2–8)	Convocation Center (571); San Antonio, TX
February 7, 2022; 6:00 p.m., ESPN+		at Southern Miss; Rescheduled from January 6	L 57–60 ^{OT}	5–17 (2–9)	Reed Green Coliseum (1,315); Hattiesburg, MS
February 13, 2022; 1:00 p.m.		at Western Kentucky	L 70–81	5–18 (2–10)	E. A. Diddle Arena (589); Bowling Green, KY
February 17, 2022; 7:00 p.m.		Southern Miss	L 50–66	5–19 (2–11)	Convocation Center (587); San Antonio, TX
February 19, 2022; 2:00 p.m.		Louisiana Tech	W 59–49	6–19 (3–11)	Convocation Center (564); San Antonio, TX
February 23, 2022; 6:00 p.m.		at UAB	L 50–57	6–20 (3–12)	Bartow Arena (149); Birmingham, AL
March 3, 2022; 6:30 p.m.		at North Texas	L 51–53	6–21 (3–13)	UNT Coliseum (1,587); Denton, TX
March 5, 2022; 2:00 p.m.		at Rice	L 48–86	6–22 (3–14)	Tudor Fieldhouse (826); Houston, TX
CUSA Tournament
March 8, 2022; 4:00 p.m., ESPN+		vs. UTEP; First Round	W 58–57 ^{OT}	7–22 (3–14)	Ford Center at The Star; Frisco, TX
March 9, 2022; 11:30 a.m., ESPN+		vs. Old Dominion; Second Round	L 45–65	7–23 (3–14)	Ford Center at The Star; Frisco, TX
*Non-conference game. ^{#}Rankings from AP Poll. (#) Tournament seedings in parentheses. All times are in Central.

== See also ==
- 2021–22 UTSA Roadrunners men's basketball team
