= 2022 Conference USA women's basketball tournament =

- Classification: Division I
- Season: 2021–22
- Teams: 14
- Site: Ford Center at The Star; Frisco, Texas
- Television: Stadium, ESPN+, CBSSN

The 2022 Conference USA women's basketball tournament was the concluding event of the 2021–22 Conference USA (C-USA) women's basketball season. It was held from March 8–12, 2022 alongside the 2022 Conference USA men's basketball tournament in Frisco, Texas, at the Ford Center at The Star.

2021–22 Conference USA women's basketball standings
	Conf.				Overall
Team	W		L	PCT	W		L	PCT
East
Charlotte †	15	–	3	.833	22	–	10	.688
Middle Tennessee	14	–	4	.778	27	–	8	.771
Old Dominion	12	–	6	.667	24	–	10	.706
Western Kentucky	11	–	7	.611	18	–	12	.600
Marshall	10	–	8	.556	15	–	13	.536
FIU	6	–	12	.333	15	–	16	.484
Florida Atlantic	1	–	17	.056	5	–	25	.167
West
Louisiana Tech	11	–	7	.611	21	–	12	.636
North Texas	10	–	7	.588	17	–	13	.567
Southern Miss	9	–	8	.529	18	–	12	.600
Rice	8	–	9	.471	14	–	13	.519
UAB	8	–	10	.444	16	–	15	.516
UTEP	6	–	12	.333	14	–	15	.483
UTSA	3	–	14	.176	7	–	23	.233
† 2022 C-USA tournament winner

== Seeds ==
East seed	School	Conf.	Over.
1	Charlotte	15–3	19–9
2	Middle Tennessee	14–4	22–6
3	Old Dominion	12–6	22–8
4	Western Kentucky	11–7	18–11
5	Marshall	10–8	15–12
6	FIU	6–12	14–15
7	Florida Atlantic	1–17	5–24
West seed	School	Conf.	Over.
1	Louisiana Tech	11–7	19–10
2	North Texas	10–7	16–11
3	Southern Miss	9–8	17–11
4	Rice	8–9	13–12
5	UAB	10–9	15–14
6	UTEP	6–12	14–14
7	UTSA	3–14	6–22

== Schedule ==
Game	Time	Matchup	Score	Television
First round – Tuesday, March 8
1	4:00 pm	W6 UTEP vs. W7 UTSA	57–58^{OT}	ESPN+
2	4:30 pm	E6 FIU vs. E7 Florida Atlantic	68–60	ESPN+
Second round – Wednesday, March 9
3	11:00am	W4 Rice vs. E5 Marshall	80–62	ESPN+
4	11:30am	E3 Old Dominion vs. W7 UTSA	65–45	ESPN+
5	1:30pm	E4 Western Kentucky vs. W5 UAB	62–74	ESPN+
6	2:00pm	W3 Southern Miss vs. E6 FIU	78–60	ESPN+
Quarterfinals – Thursday, March 10
7	11:00am	E1 Charlotte vs. W4 Rice	59-53	Stadium
8	11:30am	W2 North Texas vs. E3 Old Dominion	65-58	ESPN+
9	1:30pm	W1 Louisiana Tech vs. W5 UAB	71-65	Stadium
10	2:00pm	E2 Middle Tennessee vs. W3 Southern Miss	70-50	ESPN+
Semifinals – Friday, March 11
11	4:30 pm	E1 Charlotte vs. W2 North Texas	66–63	Stadium
12	7:00 pm	W1 Louisiana Tech vs. E2 Middle Tennessee	80–72	Stadium
Championship – Saturday, March 12
13	4:30 pm	E1 Charlotte vs. W1 Louisiana Tech	68-63	CBSSN
*Game times in CT. #-Rankings denote tournament seed

== Bracket ==
First round Tuesday, March 8 ESPN+
6E	Florida International	68
7E	Florida Atlantic	60
6W	UTEP	56
7W	UTSA	57*

Second round Wednesday, March 9 ESPN+
4E	Western Kentucky	62
5W	UAB	74
3W	Southern Miss	78
6E	Florida International	60
4W	Rice	80
5E	Marshall	62
3E	Old Dominion	65
7W	UTSA	45

Quarterfinals; Thursday, March 10; Stadium
1W	Louisiana Tech	71
5W	UAB	65
2E	Middle Tennessee	70
3W	Southern Miss	50
1E	Charlotte	59
4W	Rice	53
2W	North Texas	65
3E	Old Dominion	58

Semifinals; Friday, March 11; Stadium
1W	Louisiana Tech	80
2E	Middle Tennessee	72
1E	Charlotte	66
2W	North Texas	63

Championship; Saturday, March 12; CBSSN
1W	Louisiana Tech	63
1E	Charlotte	68

* denotes overtime period.
