= Larry Inman =

Larry Inman may refer to:

- Larry C. Inman (born 1954), American politician and member of the Michigan House of Representatives
- Larry Joe Inman (born 1948), American basketball coach
