= Jennifer Sullivan =

Jennifer Sullivan may refer to:

- Jennifer Sullivan (writer), Welsh children's author and former literary critic
- Jennifer Sullivan (politician), member of the Florida House of Representatives
- Jennifer Sullivan (basketball), American basketball coach
- Jenny Sullivan, American actress
