= List of teams with the most victories in NCAA Division I women's college basketball =

Division I Winningest Teams (All-time by Victories and All-time by Percentage)

This is a list of top Women's Division I college basketball teams ranked by the number of wins through the end of the 2024–25 season (minimum of 10 years as a Division I institution).

== Most victories ==
Rank	School	First season	Seasons	Wins	Losses	Winning Percentage
1	Tennessee	1974–75	51	1,495	395	.791
2	UConn	1974–75	51	1,341	327	.804
3	Stanford	1974–75	51	1,256	373	.771
4	James Madison	1920–21	103	1,255	604	.675
5	Texas	1974–75	51	1,251	445	.738
6	Stephen F. Austin	1968–69	57	1,233	496	.713
7	Louisiana Tech	1974–75	51	1,225	422	.744
8	Old Dominion	1969–70	56	1,183	518	.695
9	South Dakota State	1966–67	59	1,154	463	.714
10	Maryland	1971–72	54	1,150	472	.709
11	Green Bay	1973–74	52	1,142	397	.742
12	Notre Dame	1977–78	48	1,129	389	.744
13	Baylor	1974–75	51	1,128	538	.677
14	Ohio State	1965–66	60	1,127	494	.695
15	Belmont	1968–69	57	1,109	576	.658
16	Western Kentucky	1914–15	62	1,108	567	.661
17	North Carolina	1974–75	51	1,094	519	.678
18	Georgia	1973–74	52	1,086	508	.681
19	NC State	1974–75	51	1,077	504	.681
20	LSU	1975–76	50	1,073	507	.679
21	Kansas State	1968–69	57	1,071	672	.614
22	Tennessee Tech	1970–71	55	1,058	621	.630
23	South Carolina	1974–75	51	1,055	539	.662
24	Middle Tennessee State	1975–76	50	1,054	464	.694
25	Duke	1975–76	50	1,037	463	.691
26	Louisville	1975–76	50	1,033	537	.658
27	Long Beach State	1963–64	62	1,032	654	.612
28	Montana	1974–75	51	1,031	469	.687
29	Utah	1974–75	51	1,030	509	.669
30	Rutgers	1975–76	51	1,025	539	.655
31	Penn State	1964–65	61	1,021	587	.635
32	Missouri State	1969–70	56	1,019	648	.611
33	Stonehill	1971-72	53	1,008	456	.689
34	Auburn	1971–72	54	1,007	579	.635
35	Texas Tech	1975–76	50	1,002	601	.625
36	Northern Kentucky	1974–75	51	997	509	.662
37	Drake	1974–75	51	996	558	.641
38	Virginia	1973–74	52	993	564	.638
39	Iowa	1974–75	51	992	548	.644
40	North Dakota	1974–75	51	989	516	.657
41	UCLA	1974–75	51	978	569	.632
42 (Tied)	Chattanooga	1974–75	51	967	554	.636
42 (Tied)	North Dakota State	1966–67	59	967	612	.612
44	Central Arkansas	1976–77	49	959	555	.633
45	Saint Joseph's	1973–74	52	954	557	.631
46 (Tied)	Purdue	1975–76	50	948	575	.622
46 (Tied)	Ole Miss	1974–75	51	948	622	.604
48	Oklahoma	1974-75	51	938	622	.601
49	UNLV	1974-75	51	935	572	.620
50	Michigan State	1972–73	53	934	598	.610

== Most tournament titles ==
The NCAA Division 1 women's basketball tournament has taken place 42 times and was canceled 1 time because of the COVID-19 lockdowns. Out of the past 43 years, UConn and Tennessee have collectively taken 20 of those national titles. UConn has won 12 times and Tennessee has won 8. UConn and Tennessee are tied with the longest streak of National Title winning years (3 years in row), with UConn completing this most recently between 2014 and 2016.

Rank	School	National Titles	Years won	Streaks
1	UConn	12	1995, 2000, 2002, 2003, 2004, 2009, 2010, 2013, 2014, 2015, 2016, 2025	2002–2004 2009–2010 2013–2016*
2	Tennessee	8	1987, 1989, 1991, 1996, 1997, 1998, 2007, 2008	1996–1998* 2007–2008
3 (Tied)	South Carolina	3	2017, 2022, 2024	
3 (Tied)	Stanford	3	1990, 1992, 2021	
3 (Tied)	Baylor	3	2005, 2012, 2019	
6 (Tied)	Notre Dame	2	2001, 2018	
6 (Tied)	Louisiana Tech	2	1982, 1988	
6 (Tied)	USC	2	1983, 1984	1983–84
9 (Tied)	LSU	1	2023	
9 (Tied)	Texas A&M	1	2011	
9 (Tied)	Maryland	1	2006	
9 (Tied)	Purdue	1	1999	
9 (Tied)	North Carolina	1	1994	
9 (Tied)	Texas Tech	1	1993	
9 (Tied)	Texas	1	1986	
9 (Tied)	Old Dominion	1	1985	
