= Florida Atlantic Owls basketball =

The Florida Atlantic Owls have two basketball programs:

- Florida Atlantic Owls men's basketball
- Florida Atlantic Owls women's basketball
