= 2022 Women's National Invitation Tournament =

Women's postseason college basketball tournament

- Season: 2021–22
- Teams: 64
- Finals site: Frost Arena, Brookings, South Dakota
- Champions: South Dakota State (1st title)
- Runner-up: Seton Hall (1st title game)
- Semifinalists: UCLA (2nd semifinal); Middle Tennessee (1st semifinal)
- Winning coach: Aaron Johnston (1st title)
- MVP: Myah Selland (South Dakota State)
- Attendance: 5,263 (championship game)

The 2022 Women's National Invitation Tournament was a single-elimination tournament of 64 NCAA Division I Women's college basketball teams that were not selected for the field of the 2022 Women's NCAA tournament. The tournament committee announced the 64-team field on March 13, following the selection of the NCAA Tournament field. The tournament started March 16 and ended on April 2 with the championship game televised by CBSSN. The tournament was won by the South Dakota State Jackrabbits.

== Participants ==
The 2022 Postseason WNIT field consists of 32 teams that receive automatic berths – one berth from each conference – and 32 at-large teams. Three conferences (Big Ten, Big 12, SWAC) rejected their bids. All Division I teams will be considered for at-large berths, including those who are independent and/or are in the transition process of reaching full NCAA Division I status. The automatic berth will go to the team that is the highest-finishing team in its conference's regular-season standings not selected for an NCAA Tournament berth, though some of these teams may still receive an at-large berth into the NCAA women's basketball tournament. The remaining team slots will be filled by the top teams available.

Until Selection Sunday, the highest ranked team that failed to win its conference tournament was placed as the automatic qualifier. If they were selected for the NCAA Tournament, they were replaced with the team next selected.

=== Automatic qualifiers ===
Conference	School
America East	Maine
American	Tulane
Atlantic 10	Rhode Island
ASUN	Jacksonville State
ACC	Boston College
Big East	Marquette
Big Sky	Idaho State
Big South	Campbell
Big West	UC Irvine
Colonial	Drexel
C-USA	Louisiana Tech
Horizon League	Youngstown State
Ivy League	Columbia
MAAC	Quinnipiac
MAC	Toledo
MEAC	Norfolk State
Missouri Valley	Southern Illinois
Mountain West	New Mexico
Northeast	Fairleigh Dickinson
Ohio Valley	Tennessee Tech
Pac-12	UCLA
Patriot League	Holy Cross
SEC	Missouri
Southern	Wofford
Southland	Houston Baptist
Summit League	South Dakota State
Sun Belt	Troy
West Coast	San Francisco
WAC	Grand Canyon

=== At-large bids ===
Conference	School
Mountain West	Air Force
MAC	Akron
SEC	Alabama
MAC	Ball State
Patriot League	Bucknell
WAC	California Baptist
Mountain West	Colorado State
Missouri Valley	Drake
Atlantic 10	Fordham
Horizon League	Green Bay
American	Houston
MAC	Kent State
Summit	Kansas City
ASUN	Liberty
Big West	Long Beach State
C-USA	Middle Tennessee
Big Ten	Minnesota
Ohio Valley	Murray State
Missouri Valley	Northern Iowa
C-USA	North Texas
MAC	Ohio
C-USA	Old Dominion
Pac-12	Oregon State
WCC	Portland
Big Ten	Purdue
West Coast	San Diego
Big East	Seton Hall
American	SMU
America East	Stony Brook
Colonial	Towson
American	Tulsa
SEC	Vanderbilt
A10	VCU
ACC	Wake Forest
Mountain West	Wyoming

== Bracket ==
* – Denotes overtime period

=== Region 1 ===
Round 1 March 16–18
Long Beach State	59
Oregon State	70
Colorado State	63
Portland	72
San Diego	76
California Baptist	67
Grand Canyon	72
New Mexico	92
Idaho State	73
Wyoming	76
Tulsa	75
North Texas	62
Air Force	64
San Francisco	60
UC Irvine	48
UCLA	61

Round 2 March 20–21
Oregon State	74
Portland	56
San Diego	69
New Mexico	73
Wyoming	97***
Tulsa	90
Air Force	45
UCLA	61

Round 3 March 24
Oregon State	78
New Mexico	73
Wyoming	81
UCLA	82***

Quarterfinals; March 27
Oregon State	66
UCLA	74

=== Region 2 ===
Round 1 March 16–18
Maine	44
Boston College	69
Quinnipiac	61
Rhode Island	50
Old Dominion	72
Towson	66
Holy Cross	69
Columbia	80
Fairleigh Dickinson	45
Seton Hall	67
Stony Brook	48
VCU	56
Norfolk State	47
Drexel	54
Bucknell	73
Fordham	64

Round 2 March 20–21
Boston College	94
Quinnipiac	68
Old Dominion	59
Columbia	62
Seton Hall	70
VCU	67
Drexel	61
Bucknell	58

Round 3 March 24
Boston College	51
Columbia	54
Seton Hall	78
Drexel	71

Quarterfinals; March 28
Columbia	75
Seton Hall	78

=== Region 3 ===
Round 1 March 16–18
Ohio	57
South Dakota State	87
Minnesota	73
Green Bay	65
Drake	83*
Missouri	78
Kansas City	58
Northern Iowa	75
Alabama	82
Troy	79
Jacksonville State	36
Tulane	80
Houston	63
Louisiana Tech	52
Tennessee Tech	73
SMU	62

Round 2 March 20–21
South Dakota State	78
Minnesota	57
Drake	62
Northern Iowa	55
Alabama	81
Tulane	77
Houston	62
Tennessee Tech	55

Round 3 March 24
South Dakota State	84
Drake	66
Alabama	79
Houston	64

Quarterfinals; March 27
South Dakota State	78
Alabama	73

=== Region 4 ===
Round 1 March 16–18
Ball State	70
Marquette	93
Southern Illinois	60
Purdue	82
Houston Baptist	51
Toledo	61
Kent State	68
Youngstown State	59
Akron	59
Wake Forest	71
Wofford	56
Middle Tennessee	86
Murray State	47
Vanderbilt	73
Campbell	44
Liberty	50

Round 2 March 20–21
Marquette	77
Purdue	62
Toledo	79
Kent State	59
Wake Forest	55
Middle Tennessee	67
Vanderbilt	71
Liberty	45

Round 3 March 24
Marquette	82
Toledo	92
Middle Tennessee	55
Vanderbilt	53

Quarterfinals; March 28
Toledo	71
Middle Tennessee	73*

=== Semifinals and Championship Game ===
Semifinals; March 31
Seton Hall	74
Middle Tennessee	73
UCLA	59
South Dakota State	62

Championship; April 2 CBSSN
Seton Hall	50
South Dakota State	82

== Game summaries ==
=== Semifinals ===
ESPN3

March 31
7:30 pm EDT

Seton Hall Pirates 74, Middle Tennessee Blue Raiders 73
Scoring by quarter: 16–14, 22–12, 19–24, 17–23
Pts: Cooks, 28; Rebs: Cooks, 7 Asts: Park-Lane, 10	Pts: Malashka, 25; Rebs: Malashka, 9 Asts: Blakely, 4

Murphy Center
Murfreesboro, Tennessee
Attendance: 4,022
Referees: Felicia Grinter, Brian Hall, Nykesha Thompson

ESPN3

March 31
8:00 pm EDT

UCLA Bruins 59, South Dakota State Jackrabbits 62
Scoring by quarter: 15–12, 10–15, 15–13, 19–22
Pts: Thomas, 24; Rebs: Horvat, 6 Asts: Osborne, 8	Pts: Selland, 24; Rebs: Timmer, 9 Asts: Greer, 2

Frost Arena
Brookings, South Dakota
Attendance: 5,227
Referees: Doug Knight, Kim Hobbs, DeMoya Williams

=== Championship game ===
CBSSN

April 2
3:00 pm EDT

Seton Hall Pirates 50, South Dakota State Jackrabbits 82
Scoring by quarter: 7-25, 11-15, 13-22, 19-20
Pts: Cooks, 14; Rebs: Cooks, 9 Asts: Park-Lane, 4	Pts: Theisen, 16; Rebs: Theisen & Selland, 11; Asts: Selland, 5

Frost Arena
Brookings, South Dakota
Attendance: 5,263

== All-tournament team ==
- Myah Selland (South Dakota State), MVP
- Haleigh Timmer (South Dakota State)
- Sidney Cooks (Seton Hall)
- Lauren Park-Lane (Seton Hall)
- Ilmar’l Thomas (UCLA)
- Kseniya Malashka (Middle Tennessee)

== See also ==
- 2022 National Invitation Tournament
