= Inge Nissen =

Danish basketball player and coach

Personal information
- Listed height: 6 ft 5 in (1.96 m)

Career information
- College: Old Dominion (1976–1980)
- Position: Power forward / center
- Coaching career: 1989–present

Career history

Playing
- 1980–1981: Chicago Hustle

Coaching
- 1989–2015: FIU (assistant)
- 2015: FIU (Interim HC)

Career highlights
- As player: All-WBL (1981); WBL All-Star (1981); Kodak All-American (1980); 2× AIAW national champion (1979, 1980); No. 42 retired by Old Dominion Lady Monarchs
- Stats at Basketball Reference
- Women's Basketball Hall of Fame

Inge Nissen is a Danish basketball player and coach. A 2012 inductee to the Women's Basketball Hall of Fame, Nissen was a star for the Danish national team and a college All-American at Old Dominion University. After her playing career, Nissen became an assistant coach for long-time Florida International University coach Cindy Russo and was named interim head coach when Russo retired during the 2014–15 season.

== Early life ==
Inge Nissen is from Randers, Denmark, where she starred at Randers Statsskole and Randers Cimbria Basketball in the late 1960's and early 1970's

== Playing career ==
Nissen enjoyed an exceptional basketball career at both the collegiate and professional levels. Originally from Denmark, she was regarded as one of Europe’s leading amateur players in the early 1970s. During this period, she played a key role in securing five national championships across three countries—Denmark (1972), Norway (1973), and France (1974, 1975, and 1985).

In 1976, she moved to the United States to join Old Dominion University. Throughout her four-year college career, she helped establish the Lady Monarchs as a nationally recognized program, consistently ranked among the top 15 teams. A major highlight came in 1978, when she led the team to a WNIT title and a No. 12 finish in the final Associated Press rankings. She followed this by guiding Old Dominion to back-to-back AIAW National Championships in 1979 and 1980.

Nissen’s individual achievements were equally impressive. Between 1976 and 1980, she earned All-American honors from several organizations, including Kodak, WNIT, and the National Scouting Association. She was also named team MVP for three consecutive seasons (1978–1980) and was recognized as the university’s Outstanding Female Athlete of the Year in 1980.

By the end of her college career, she had set school records for both total points (2,647) and rebounds (1,459), figures that still rank among the best in program history. She also set enduring records, including 28 rebounds in a single game, 148 free throws made in one season, and 518 free throws made over a career. Her scoring ability was remarkable, with multiple games exceeding 40 points and several standout performances in postseason play.

In recognition of her impact, Nissen was inducted into the Old Dominion Hall of Fame in 1985. Her No. 42 jersey remains one of only a select few to be retired by the program. She has also been named to the university’s all-time Lady Monarch team and was later recognized by ESPN as one of the top 25 players from the era before the NCAA governed women’s basketball.

== Old Dominion University statistics ==
Legend
GP	Games played	GS	Games started	MPG	Minutes per game
FG%	Field goal percentage	3P%	3-point field goal percentage	FT%	Free throw percentage
RPG	Rebounds per game	APG	Assists per game	SPG	Steals per game
BPG	Blocks per game	PPG	Points per game	**Bold**	Career high

Year	Team	GP	Points	FG%	FT%	RPG	APG	BPG	PPG
1976-77	Old Dominion	32	592	**52.3%**	53.9%	**12.8**	1.8	2.5	18.5
1977-78	Old Dominion	32	662	47.2%	70.8%	11.8	1.0	2.5	20.7
1978-79	Old Dominion	34	**749**	52.1%	**74.7%**	10.0	0.8	4.5	**22.0**
1979-80	Old Dominion	**37**	644	43.7%	70.3%	10.3	**1.9**	**2.6**	17.4
Career		135	2647	48.7%	68.3%	11.2	1.4	1.9	19.6

== Head coaching record ==
Record table
Season	Team	Overall	Conference	Standing	Postseason
**FIU Panthers** (Conference USA) (2015–2015)
2014–15	FIU	0–13*	0–13*	14th	
Total:		0–13			

* Nissen became interim head coach on January 22, 2015, following the resignation of Cindy Russo. Their combined records for the 2014–15 season is 3–26 (0–18 C-USA).
