= Cindy Russo =

American basketball coach

Biographical details
- Born: September 7, 1952 (age 74); Portsmouth, Virginia, U.S.

Playing career
- 1972–1975: Old Dominion

Coaching career (HC unless noted)
- 1975–1977: Old Dominion (asst.)
- 1977–1978: FIU
- 1978–1980: Lamar
- 1980–2015: FIU

Head coaching record
- Overall: 707–408 (.634)

Cindy Russo (born September 7, 1952) served as the women's basketball head coach at Florida International and Lamar. Retiring in January 2015, her career spanned 39 years with 38 of those years as a head coach. She had several accomplishments over her career. She guided the FIU Panthers to 20 consecutive winning seasons. Her teams also achieved 20 win seasons 18 times. Her teams participated in six NCAA Division I women's basketball tournaments, seven WNIT tournaments, and two NCAA Division II Tournaments.

Russo was born in Portsmouth, Virginia and graduated from Old Dominion University in 1975.

== Head coaching record ==
Record table
Season	Team	Overall	Conference	Standing	Postseason
FIU Golden Panthers (AIAW independent) (1977–1978)
1977–78	FIU	8–14			
Lamar Lady Cardinals (AIAW Independent) (1978–1980)
1978–79	Lamar	16–11			
1979–80	Lamar	20–11			
FIU Golden Panthers (AIAW Independent) (1980–1982)
1980–81	FIU	7–13			
1981–82	FIU	27–10			AIAW Small College First Round
FIU Golden Panthers (NCAA Division II independent) (1982–1987)
1982–83	FIU	17–7			NCAA D-II First Round
1983–84	FIU	17–11			
1984–85	FIU	22–6			
1985–86	FIU	26–2			NCAA D-II First Round
1986–87	FIU	21–7			NCAA D-II Second Round
FIU Golden Panthers (New South Women's Athletic Conference/Trans America Athletic Conference) (1987–1998)
1987–88	FIU	21–7	9–3	2nd	
1988–89	FIU	20–7	11–1	1st	
1989–90	FIU	20–9	10–2	T–1st	
1990–91	FIU	16–13	7–5	3rd	
1991–92	FIU	23–10	10–2	T–1st	WNIT Consolation
1992–93	FIU	25–6	12–0	1st	WNIT Third Place
1993–94	FIU	25–4	11–1	1st	NCAA D-I First Round
1994–95	FIU	27–5	15–1	1st	NCAA D-I Second Round
1995–96	FIU	23–5	16–0	1st	
1996–97	FIU	21–9	12–4	1st	NCAA D-I First Round
1997–98	FIU	29–2	15–1	1st	NCAA D-I Second Round
FIU Golden Panthers (Sun Belt Conference) (1998–2013)
1998–99	FIU	23–7	9–3	2nd	NCAA D-I First Round
1999–2000	FIU	16–13	10–6	T–3rd	
2000–01	FIU	20–10	11–5	2nd (East)	WNIT First Round
2001–02	FIU	27–6	13–1	1st (East)	NCAA D-I Second Round
2002–03	FIU	19–11	9–5	T–2nd (East)	WNIT First Round
2003–04	FIU	0–16*	0–9*		
2004–05	FIU	18–11	7–7	4th (East)	
2005–06	FIU	19–13	9–5	3rd (East)	WNIT Second Round
2006–07	FIU	16–14	9–9	3rd (East)	
2007–08	FIU	13–18	8–10	4th (East)	
2008–09	FIU	6–24	4–14	6th (East)	
2009–10	FIU	14–16	9–9	T–4th (East)	
2010–11	FIU	16–16	10–6	2nd (East)	
2011–12	FIU	23–11	10–6	3rd (East)	WNIT Second Round
2012–13	FIU	19–13	12–8	3rd (East)	WNIT First Round
FIU Panthers (Conference USA) (2013–2015)
2013–14	FIU	15–18	6–10	T–9th	
2014–15	FIU	3–13**	0–5**		
Total:		707–395 (.642)			
National champion Postseason invitational champion Conference regular season champion Conference regular season and conference tournament champion Division regular season champion Division regular season and conference tournament champion Conference tournament champion

* 2003–04 wins vacated by the NCAA; FIU originally finished 4th in the East Division.
** Partial season. Coach Russo resigned effective immediately on January 22, 2015. Interim head coach completed the season. Inge Nissen became interim head coach and went 0–13 (all in C-USA), for the team to finish 3–26 (0–18 C-USA) and in 14th place.

== See also ==
- List of college women's basketball career coaching wins leaders
