= Larry Joe Inman =

American college basketball coach (born 1948)

Biographical details
- Born: January 3, 1948 (age 78); Gallatin, Tennessee, U.S.

Coaching career (HC unless noted)
- 1970–1973: Gallatin JHS
- 1973–1978: Mount Juliet HS
- 1978–1986: Middle Tennessee
- 1988–2008: Eastern Kentucky
- 2010–2012: Lebanon HS
- 2012–2017: Tennessee State

Head coaching record
- Overall: 545–397
- Tournaments: 2–7 (NCAA); 1–1 (WNIT)

Accomplishments and honors

Championships
- 11× OVC regular season (1980, 1982, 1983–86, 1995, 1997–98, 2002, 2005); 7× OVC Tournament (1983–86, 1997, 2005, 2015)

Larry Joe Inman (born January 3, 1948) is an American college basketball coach. The Tennessee State Lady Tigers are members of the Ohio Valley Conference (OVC) and compete in the NCAA's Division I. In 1991, while at Eastern Kentucky, Inman became the first coach to earn the OVC Coach of the Year award at two different schools, having previously been honored at Middle Tennessee.

== Biography ==
A native of Gallatin, Tennessee, Inman received his bachelor's degree from Austin Peay State University in 1970 and his master's degree from Tennessee State in 1978. He and his wife, the former Bobbie Gene Follis of Shelbyville, Tennessee, have a son, two daughters, and five grandchildren.

== Coaching career ==
Iman began his coaching career in 1970 in his hometown, at Gallatin Junior High School, where his teams were 51–4 in his three seasons. The next five years were spent as coach of the girls team at Mount Juliet High School in Mount Juliet, Tennessee where his teams went 126–24, won three conference titles, four district and three regional championships, and the 1977 Tennessee Class AAA state tournament.

Inman was then hired as the women's coach at Middle Tennessee State University in Murfreesboro. His Blue Raiders teams won six regular season conference titles and four OVC tournaments in his eight seasons at MTSU. His teams played in the NCAA tournament four consecutive years, 1983–86, and Inman was named OVC Coach of the Year three times.

After two years away from coaching, in 1988, Inman was named head coach of the Lady Colonels at Eastern Kentucky University in Richmond, Kentucky, a school that had had a winning season only once in eleven OVC seasons. In his third season, the Lady Colonels posted their first winning season in six years, and Inman became the first coach to be named the OVC Coach of the Year at two different institutions. During his twenty-year tenure at EKU, Inman's teams won the OVC regular season five times and the conference tournament twice, advancing to the NCAA tournament twice and the Women's NIT once, and he was named OVC Coach of the Year five times.

Inman retired in 2008 but returned to coaching at Lebanon High School in Lebanon, Tennessee in 2010.

The all-time winningest coach in Ohio Valley Conference women's basketball history, Inman was elected to the OVC Hall of Fame in 2009. On April 16, 2012, Tennessee State University in Nashville, announced that, following a national search, Inman was to be their new head women's basketball coach.

After upsetting SIUE and UT Martin to win the 2015 OVC Women's Basketball Tournament, Inman took his third OVC team to the NCAA Tournament.

On March 9, 2017, Inman resigned from Tennessee State for personal reasons.

== Head coaching record ==
Record table
Season	Team	Overall	Conference	Standing	Postseason
Middle Tennessee Blue Raiders (Ohio Valley Conference) (1978–1986)
1978–79	Middle Tennessee	14–13	6–4	3rd	
1979–80	Middle Tennessee	23–10	10–1	1st	
1980–81	Middle Tennessee	16–13	6–3	T–2nd	
1981–82	Middle Tennessee	20–5	9–3	1st	
1982–83	Middle Tennessee	26–5	10–0	1st	NCAA Second Round
1983–84	Middle Tennessee	19–6	12–2	1st	NCAA First Round
1984–85	Middle Tennessee	23–7	13–1	1st	NCAA First Round
1985–86	Middle Tennessee	20–10	13–1	1st	NCAA Second Round
Middle Tennessee:		161–73	78–16		
Eastern Kentucky Lady Colonels (Ohio Valley Conference) (1988–2008)
1988–89	Eastern Kentucky	12–14	5–7	5th	
1989–90	Eastern Kentucky	12–14	6–6	T–4th	
1990–91	Eastern Kentucky	14–13	7–5	3rd	
1991–92	Eastern Kentucky	20–9	10–4	T–2nd	
1992–93	Eastern Kentucky	12–15	10–6	T–3rd	
1993–94	Eastern Kentucky	17–9	12–4	T–2nd	
1994–95	Eastern Kentucky	19–9	12–4	T–1st	
1995–96	Eastern Kentucky	11–16	7–9	T–4th	
1996–97	Eastern Kentucky	24–6	16–2	1st	NCAA First Round
1997–98	Eastern Kentucky	20–8	15–3	T–1st	
1998–99	Eastern Kentucky	11–16	8–10	6th	
1999–2000	Eastern Kentucky	13–15	10–8	3rd	
2000–01	Eastern Kentucky	22–6	14–2	2nd	
2001–02	Eastern Kentucky	23–8	13–3	1st tie	WNIT Second Round
2002–03	Eastern Kentucky	18–11	10–6	3rd	
2003–04	Eastern Kentucky	15–15	9–7	5th tie	
2004–05	Eastern Kentucky	23–8	15–1	1st	NCAA First Round
2005–06	Eastern Kentucky	7–20	7–13	9th	
2006–07	Eastern Kentucky	12–18	9–11	T–7th	
2007–08	Eastern Kentucky	14–14	9–11	T–6th	
Eastern Kentucky:		319–244	204–118		
Tennessee State Lady Tigers (Ohio Valley Conference) (2012–present)
2012–13	Tennessee State	13–15	9–7	4th (East)	
2013–14	Tennessee State	12–18	9–7	T–2nd (East)	
2014–15	Tennessee State	18–13	12–4	3rd (East)	NCAA First Round
2015–16	Tennessee State	12–18	7–9	3rd (East)	
2016–17	Tennessee State	10–16	5–11	T–11th	
Tennessee State:		65–80	42–38		
Total:		545–397			
National champion Postseason invitational champion Conference regular season champion Conference regular season and conference tournament champion Division regular season champion Division regular season and conference tournament champion Conference tournament champion
