= Jennifer Sullivan (basketball) =

American basketball coach

Current position
- Title: Assistant coach
- Team: Missouri
- Conference: SEC

Biographical details
- Born: June 4, 1983 (age 42); Memphis, Tennessee

Playing career
- 2001–2005: Memphis

Coaching career (HC unless noted)
- 2005–2007: Rhodes (assistant)
- 2008–2009: McNeese State (assistant)
- 2009–2012: Arkansas State (assistant)
- 2012–2013: Louisiana (associate HC)
- 2013–2018: Missouri State (assistant)
- 2018–2019: Ohio State (assistant)
- 2019–2021: Tennessee (assistant)
- 2021–2025: Florida Atlantic
- 2025–present: Missouri (assistant)

Head coaching record
- Overall: 39–83 (.320)

Jennifer Sullivan (born June 4, 1983) is an American basketball coach who is currently an assistant women's basketball coach at the University of Missouri. Prior to Missouri, she was the head coach of the Florida Atlantic Owls women's basketball team for four seasons.

== Memphis statistics ==
Legend
GP	Games played	GS	Games started	MPG	Minutes per game
FG%	Field goal percentage	3P%	3-point field goal percentage	FT%	Free throw percentage
RPG	Rebounds per game	APG	Assists per game	SPG	Steals per game
BPG	Blocks per game	PPG	Points per game	**Bold**	Career high

Year	Team	GP	Points	FG%	3P%	FT%	RPG	APG	SPG	BPG	PPG
2001–02	Memphis	14	13	35.3%	-	50.0%	0.1	0.2	0.4	-	0.9
2002–03	Memphis	28	102	42.1%	-	35.3%	2.7	1.6	**1.2**	-	3.6
2003–04	Memphis	**33**	**351**	**57.8%**	-	66.3%	3.5	1.6	1.0	**0.2**	11.3
2004–05	Memphis	29	334	49.5%	-	**69.1%**	**4.2**	**2.4**	1.0	0.1	**11.5**
Career		102	800	51.0%	-	64.5%	3.0	1.6	1.0	0.1	7.8

== Career ==
She was previously an assistant coach at the University of Tennessee, and has also had coaching stops at Ohio State, Missouri State, and Louisiana.

== Head coaching record ==
- Florida Atlantic
- CUSA

Statistics overview
Season	Team	Overall	Conference	Standing	Postseason
**Florida Atlantic Owls** (Conference USA) (2021–2023)
2021–22	Florida Atlantic	5–25	1–17	7th East	
2022–23	Florida Atlantic	12–18	5–15	T–10th	
**Florida Atlantic Owls** (American Athletic Conference) (2023–2025)
2023–24	Florida Atlantic	11–19	6–12	12th	
2024–25	Florida Atlantic	11–21	3–15	13th	
Florida Atlantic:		39–83 (.320)	15–59 (.203)		
Total:		39–83 (.320)			
National champion Postseason invitational champion Conference regular season champion Conference regular season and conference tournament champion Division regular season champion Division regular season and conference tournament champion Conference tournament champion
