= FIU Panthers women's basketball =

2025–26 FIU Panthers women's basketball team
- University: Florida International University
- Head coach: Jesyka Burks-Wiley (5th season)
- Location: Westchester, Florida
- Arena: Ocean Bank Convocation Center (capacity: 5,000)
- Conference: C-USA
- Nickname: Panthers
- Colors: Blue and gold

NCAA Division I tournament appearances
- 1994, 1995, 1997, 1998, 1999, 2002

AIAW tournament appearances
- Division II: 1982

Conference tournament champions
- TAAC/ASUN: 1992, 1993, 1994, 1995, 1997, 1998; Sun Belt: 2002

Conference regular-season champions
- 1989, 1990, 1992, 1993, 1994, 1995, 1997, 1998, 2002

Uniforms
Home	Away

The FIU Panthers women's basketball team represents Florida International University in women's basketball. The school competes in Conference USA in Division I of the National Collegiate Athletic Association (NCAA). The Panthers play home basketball games at Ocean Bank Convocation Center in Westchester, Florida.

== History ==
The Panthers (formerly known as the Golden Panthers) have won seven tournaments, six while in the Trans America Athletic Conference, and one while they played in the Sun Belt Conference. They also appeared in the NCAA Division II Tournament in 1983, 1986, and 1987. As of the end of the 2015–16 season, the Panthers have an all-time record of 692–466 since beginning play in 1975. All wins from the 2003–04 season (11) were vacated due to NCAA sanctions.

Season	Record	Conference Record	Coach
1975–76	6–12	n/a	Susan Uscier
1976–77	7–12	n/a	Patty Abbot
1977–78	8–14	n/a	Cindy Russo
1978–79	0–14	n/a	Rick Jendra
1979–80	6–16	n/a	Mary Ellen Fiske
1980–81	7–13	n/a	Cindy Russo
1981–82	27–10	n/a	Cindy Russo
1982–83	17–7	n/a	Cindy Russo
1983–84	17–11	n/a	Cindy Russo
1984–85	22–6	n/a	Cindy Russo
1985–86	26–2	n/a	Cindy Russo
1986–87	26–3	n/a	Cindy Russo
1987–88	21–7	9–3	Cindy Russo
1988–89	20–7	11–1	Cindy Russo
1989–90	20–9	10–2	Cindy Russo
1990–91	16–13	7–5	Cindy Russo
1991–92	23–10	10–2	Cindy Russo
1992–93	25–6	12–0	Cindy Russo
1993–94	25–4	11–1	Cindy Russo
1994–95	27–5	15–1	Cindy Russo
1995–96	23–5	16–0	Cindy Russo
1996–97	21–9	12–4	Cindy Russo
1997–98	29–2	15–1	Cindy Russo
1998–99	23–7	9–3	Cindy Russo
1999-00	16–13	10–6	Cindy Russo
2000–01	20–10	11–5	Cindy Russo
2001–02	27–6	13–1	Cindy Russo
2002–03	19–11	9–5	Cindy Russo
2003–04	0–16	0–9	Cindy Russo
2004–05	18–11	7–7	Cindy Russo
2005–06	19–13	9–5	Cindy Russo
2006–07	16–14	9–9	Cindy Russo
2007–08	13–18	8–10	Cindy Russo
2008–09	6–24	4–14	Cindy Russo
2009–10	14–16	9–9	Cindy Russo
2010–11	16–16	10–6	Cindy Russo
2011–12	23–11	10–6	Cindy Russo
2012–13	19–13	12–8	Cindy Russo
2013–14	15–18	7–10	Cindy Russo
2014–15	3–26	0–18	Cindy Russo (3–13); Inge Nissen (0–13)
2015–16	5–26	2–16	Marlin Chinn
2016–17	5–24	3–15	Tiara Malcom
2017–18	8–21	5–11	Tiara Malcom

== Postseason appearances ==
=== NCAA Division I results ===
FIU has appeared in the NCAA Division I women's basketball tournament six times. They have a record of 3–6.

Year	Seed	Round	Opponent	Result
1994	#8	First Round	#9 Clemson	L 64–65
1995	#9	First Round; Second Round	#8 Old Dominion #1 Tennessee	W 81–76; L 44–70
1997	#14	First Round	#3 Florida	L 68–92
1998	#7	First Round; Second Round	#10 Marquette #2 North Carolina	W 59–45; L 72–85
1999	#9	First Round	#8 Xavier	L 71–85
2002	#5	First Round; Second Round	#12 Creighton #4 Penn State	W 73–58; L 79–96

=== NCAA Division II tournament results ===
The Golden Panthers made three appearances in the NCAA Division II women's basketball tournament. They had a combined record of 1–3.

Year	Round	Opponent	Result
1983	First Round	C.W. Post	L, 59–60
1986	Regional Finals	Delta State	L, 64–93
1987	First Round; Regional Finals	Albany State; Delta State	W, 76–53; L, 73–75 (OT)

=== AIAW College Division/Division II ===
The Golden Panthers made one appearance in the AIAW National Division II basketball tournament, with a combined record of 0–1.

Year	Round	Opponent	Result
1982	First Round	College of Charleston	L, 44–96
