= Western Kentucky Lady Toppers basketball =

Women's college basketball team

Western Kentucky Lady Toppers
2025–26 Western Kentucky Lady Toppers basketball team
- University: Western Kentucky University
- First season: 1914–15
- Head coach: Greg Collins (8th season)
- Location: Bowling Green, Kentucky
- Arena: E. A. Diddle Arena (capacity: 7,326)
- Conference: C-USA
- Nickname: Lady Toppers
- Colors: Red and white
- All-time record: 1026–499 (.673)

NCAA Division I tournament runner-up
- 1992
Other NCAA Division I tournament results
Final Four	1985, 1986, 1992
Elite Eight	1985, 1986, 1992
Sweet Sixteen	1985, 1986, 1991, 1992, 1993, 1995
Appearances	1985, 1986, 1987, 1988, 1989, 1990, 1991, 1992, 1993, 1994, 1995, 1997, 1998, 2000, 2003, 2008, 2014, 2015, 2017, 2018

Conference tournament champions
- Sun Belt: 1986, 1988, 1989, 1991, 1992, 1993, 1995, 2003, 2008, 2014; C-USA: 2015, 2017, 2018

Conference regular-season champions
- Kentucky State Champions: 1923; KIAC: 1929; Sun Belt: 1989, 1992, 1993, 1997; Sun Belt East: 2003, 2004, 2005, 2006, 2008; C-USA: 2015, 2017

Uniforms
Home	Away

The Western Kentucky Lady Toppers basketball team represents Western Kentucky University in Bowling Green, Kentucky. The team currently competes in the NCAA Division I as a member of Conference USA. Greg Collins is entering his seventh season as the head coach of the Lady Toppers in 2024–25 after previously serving as the team's associate head coach under Michelle Clark-Heard.

== History ==
Western Kentucky began playing women's basketball in 1914. The program hired Paul Sanderford in 1982. The first two seasons saw them record 20 wins each before the 1984-85 team reached the NCAA tournament for the first time ever as an at-large team with a record of 26–5. They were one of the four Regional hosts, and the Toppers used it to their advantage, defeating #1 seed Texas in the Regional Semifinals to reach their first ever Regional Final before defeating Ole Miss to win their first ever Elite Eight. In a Final Four hosted in Austin, the Toppers lost 91–78 to Georgia in a game where both teams combined for a record 101 points (57 from Georgia, 44 from Western Kentucky) in the second half. Lillie Mason was named to the All-Tournament Team. The following year saw them win the Sun Belt outright and record a 30-win season with 32 total wins. Western Kentucky was ranked as a #4 seed but made it all the way back to the Regional finals and beat #2 Rutgers to make the Final Four again. Facing undefeated Texas in a Final Four hosted in Lexington, the Toppers were defeated 90–65. The Toppers routinely made the tournament over the next couple of years that saw their best season come with the 1991-92 team. As a #4 seed, they defeated the #1 seed Tennessee to reach their third ever regional final and then defeated #2 Maryland to make the Final Four. They faced #8 seed Southwest Missouri State 84–72 to make their first ever National Championship Game against Stanford. They were defeated 78-62 while Kim Pehlke was named to the All-Tournament Team. The 1994–95 season was the 11th and final consecutive time the team made the NCAA Tournament and they reached the Sweet Sixteen before losing to #1 seed Tennessee. Sanderson left the team to coach at the University of Nebraska in 1997; in 15 seasons, he led the team to 14 postseason appearances (12 NCAA, two NWIT).

== Postseason ==
=== NCAA tournament results ===
The Lady Toppers have appeared in the NCAA tournament 20 times, with a record of 17–20. They were NCAA runners-up in 1992 and made Final Four appearances in 1985 and 1986.

Year	Round	Opponent	Result/Score
1985	First Round; Regional Semifinals; Regional Finals; Final Four	Middle Tennessee; Texas; Mississippi; Georgia	W 77–55; W 92–90; W 72–68; L 78–91
1986	Second Round; Regional Semifinals; Regional Finals; Final Four	St. Joseph's; James Madison; Rutgers; Texas	W 74–65; W 72–51; W 89–74; L 65–90
1987	First Round	at USC	L 69–81
1988	First Round	at Georgia	L 66–84
1989	First Round	West Virginia	L 57–66
1990	First Round	at DePaul	L 63–73
1991	Second Round; Sweet Sixteen	Florida State at Tennessee	W 72–69; L 61–68
1992	Second Round; Regional Semifinals; Regional Finals; Final Four; National Championship Game	Alabama; Tennessee; Maryland; Southwest Missouri State; Stanford	W 98–68; W 75–70; W 75–70; W 84–72; L 62–78
1993	Second Round; Sweet Sixteen	Miami (FL); Ohio State	W 78–63; L 73–86
1994	First Round; Second Round	Rutgers; Southern Miss	W 84–73; L 69–72
1995	First Round; Second Round; Sweet Sixteen	Toledo; Oregon State; Tennessee	W 77–63; W 85–78; L 67–87
1997	First Round	Arizona	L 54–76
1998	First Round; Second Round	Stephen F. Austin; Tennessee	W 88–76; L 62–82
2000	First Round; Second Round	Marquette; Duke	W 68–65; L 70–90
2003	First Round	Rutgers	L 52–64
2008	First Round	UTEP	L 60–92
2014	First Round	Baylor	L 74–87
2015	First Round	Texas	L 64–66
2017	First Round	Ohio State	L 63–70
2018	First Round	Oregon State	L 58–82

=== WNIT results ===
The Lady Toppers have appeared in the Women's National Invitation Tournament (WNIT) 13 times, with an overall record of 18–15. They made the semifinals of the tournament in 2006 and 2007.

Year	Round	Opponent	Result/Score
1984*	Third Round	California; Vanderbilt; Clemson	W 82–76; L 68–79; L 106–110 (OT)
1996*	Third Round	Arizona; Princeton; UC Santa Barbara	L 72–80; W 74–41; L 61–77
2001	Quarterfinals	Mississippi; Indiana; Ohio State	W 95–92; W 64–63; L 61–70
2002	First Round	at Illinois	L 84–91
2004	Quarterfinals	Cincinnati; Memphis at UNLV	W 80–78 (OT); W 104–87; L 75–78
2005	First Round	Xavier	L 85–87
2006	Semifinals	Tennessee Tech; Charlotte at Villanova at Kansas State	W 83–66; W 81–68; W 94–81; L 56–57 (OT)
2007	Semifinals	Minnesota; Mississippi State; Hofstra at Wisconsin	W 73–57; W 56–53; W 72–54; L 72–79
2010	First Round	Illinois	L 51–68
2013	Second Round	East Carolina at Auburn	W 88–77 (OT); L 66–84
2016	Quarterfinals	Dayton; Tennessee-Martin at Saint Louis at South Dakota	W 89–72; W 64–57; W 78–76 (OT); L 54–68
2019	Third Round	at Miami (OH); Morehead State at Ohio	W 67–63; W 68–65; L 60–68
2023	First Round	at Kansas	L 72–86

- Note: Appearances were in the National Women's Invitational Tournament (NWIT), prior to the start of the WNIT.

== Rivalries ==
=== Middle Tennessee Blue Raiders ===
WKU–Middle Tennessee: All-Time Record
Games played	First meeting	Last meeting	WKU wins	WKU losses	Win %
78	1924–25 (lost 7–41)	January 23, 2021 (lost 60–77)	33	45	.423

=== Louisiana Tech Lady Techsters ===
WKU–Louisiana Tech: All-Time Record
Games played	First meeting	Last meeting	WKU wins	WKU losses	Win %
50	December 3, 1983 (lost 50–82)	January 9, 2021 (lost 52–58)	23	27	.460

=== Louisville Cardinals ===
WKU–Louisville: All-Time Record
Games played	First meeting	Last meeting	WKU wins	WKU losses	Win %
47	1921–22 (won 26–6)	November 5, 2019 (lost 56–75)	25	22	.532

== Home venue ==
=== E. A. Diddle Arena ===
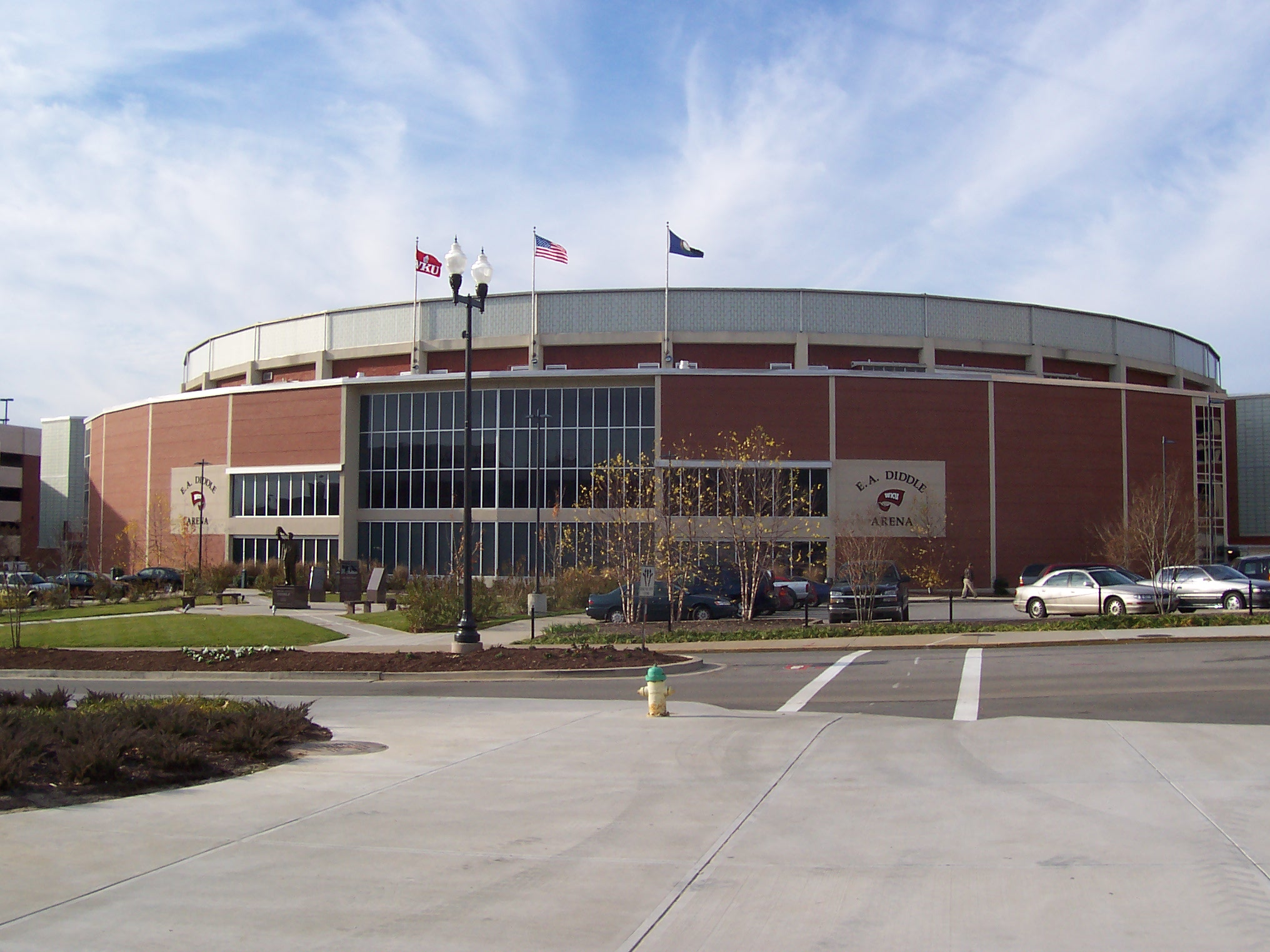
E.A. Diddle Arena

== Players ==
=== WNBA draft ===
Year	Rnd	Pick	Overall	Player name	Position	WNBA team
2001	3	1	33	ShaRae Mansfield	F	Houston Comets
2006	3	8	36	Tiffany Porter-Talbert	G	Los Angeles Sparks
2008	3	3	31	Crystal Kelly	F	Houston Comets

== Coaches ==
- J. L. Author (1914–16) 1–0 record in 2 seasons as head coach (incomplete records)
- No Team 1916–21
- Josephine Cherry and W.J. Craig (1921–22) 4–0 record in 1 season as co-head coaches
- Edgar Diddle (1922–24) 11–6 record in 2 seasons as head coach
- Jane Culbert (1924–25) 3–6 record in 1 season as head coach
- Nell Robbins (1925–26) 3–6 record in 1 season as head coach
- Elizabeth Dabbs (1926–30) 20–11 record in 4 seasons as head coach (incomplete records)
- No Team (1930–73)
- Pam Dickson (1973–1974) 4–7 record in 1 season as head coach
- Dr. Carol Hughes (1974–1976) 22–20 record in 2 seasons as head coach
- Julia Yeater (1976–1978) 44–18 in 2 seasons as head coach
- Eileen Canty (1978–1982) 50–62 in 4 seasons as head coach
- Paul Sanderford (1982–1997) 365–120 in 15 seasons as head coach
- Steve Small (1997–2001) 88–40 in 4 seasons as head coach
- Shawn Campbell (2001–2002) 14–12 in 1 season as head coach
- Marti Whitmore (2002) 2–2 in 1 season as head coach (finished 2002 season after Campbell's departure)
- Mary Taylor Cowles (2002–2012) 199–119 in 10 seasons as head coach
- Michelle Clark-Heard (2012–2018) 154–48 in 6 seasons as head coach
- Greg Collins (2018–present) 49–38 in 3 seasons as head coach

== See also ==
- List of teams with the most victories in NCAA Division I women's college basketball
