= Florida Atlantic Owls women's basketball =

2025–26 Florida Atlantic Owls women's basketball team
- University: Florida Atlantic University
- Head coach: LeAnn Freeland (1st season)
- Location: Boca Raton, Florida
- Arena: Eleanor R. Baldwin Arena (capacity: 5,000)
- Conference: The American
- Nickname: Owls
- Colors: Blue and red

NCAA Division I tournament appearances
- 1989*, 1990*, 1991*, 1993*, 2006

Conference tournament champions
- 2006

Uniforms
Home	Away	Alternate
- * Division II

The Florida Atlantic Owls women's basketball team represent Florida Atlantic University in women's basketball. The school competes in the American Conference in Division I of the National Collegiate Athletic Association (NCAA). The Owls play home basketball games at Eleanor R. Baldwin Arena in Boca Raton, Florida.

== History ==
As of the end of the 2018–19 season, the Owls have an all-time record of 452–517 since beginning play in 1984. They have won one conference title and played in the NCAA tournament (both in 2006). They played in the Atlantic Sun Conference from 1994 to 2006, the Sun Belt Conference from 2006 to 2013, Conference USA from 2013 to 2023, and the American Conference since 2023.

Season	Record	Conference record	Coach
1984–85	10–11	n/a	Robin Tucker
1985–86	17–6	n/a	Robin Tucker
1986–87	21–5	n/a	Robin Tucker
1987–88	13–15	n/a	Wayne Allen
1988–89	21–8	n/a (Division II Regional)	Wayne Allen
1989–90	22–7	n/a (Division II Regional)	Wayne Allen
1990–91	23–6	n/a (Division II Regional)	Wayne Allen
1991–92	16–10	n/a	Wayne Allen
1992–93	20–8	n/a (Division II Regional)	Wayne Allen
1993–94	5–22	n/a	Wayne Allen
1994–95	9–18	5–11	Wayne Allen
1995–96	13–16	8–8	Wayne Allen
1996–97	8–17	3–13	Wayne Allen
1997–98	12–15	6–10	Wayne Allen
1998–99	5–21	3–13	Wayne Allen
1999–00	15–14	12–6	Chancellor Dugan
2000–01	9–19	6–12	Chancellor Dugan
2001–02	17–14	13–7	Chancellor Dugan
2002–03	14–14	12–4	Chancellor Dugan
2003–04	12–16	11–9	Chancellor Dugan
2004–05	12–16	11–9	Chancellor Dugan
2005–06	20–11	16–4	Chancellor Dugan
2006–07	6–25	2–16	Chancellor Dugan
2007–08	6–22	2–16	Chancellor Dugan
2008–09	12–17	9–9	Chancellor Dugan
2009–10	14–15	10–8	Chancellor Dugan
2010–11	7–21	4–12	Chancellor Dugan
2011–12	17–13	11–5	Chancellor Dugan
2012–13	17–13	11–5	Kellie Lewis-Jay
2013–14	16–14	6–10	Kellie Lewis-Jay
2014–15	13–17	7–11	Kellie Lewis-Jay
2015–16	14–16	6–12	Kellie Lewis-Jay
2016–17	4–25	0–18	Kellie Lewis-Jay
2017–18	13–15	7–9	Jim Jabir
2018–19	5–21	2–11	Jim Jabir
2019–20	13–17	7–11	Jim Jabir
2020–21	11–11	8–8	Jim Jabir
2021–22			Jennifer Sullivan

== Postseason ==
=== NCAA Division I tournament results ===
The Owls have made one appearance in the NCAA Division I women's basketball tournament. They have a combined record of 0–1.

Year	Round	Opponent	Result
2006	First round	LSU	L 72–48

=== NCAA Division II tournament results ===
The Owls made four appearances in the NCAA Division II women's basketball tournament. They had a combined record of 1–4.

Year	Round	Opponent	Result
1989	First round	Cal State Northridge	L 54–68
1990	First round Regional finals	Virginia State; Bellarmine	W 73–62; L 55–62
1991	First round	North Dakota	L 78–94
1993	First round	Florida Tech	L 74–86
