= Middle Tennessee Blue Raiders women's basketball =

2026–27 Middle Tennessee Blue Raiders women's basketball team
- University: Middle Tennessee State University
- Head coach: Matt Insell (1st season)
- Location: Murfreesboro, Tennessee
- Arena: Murphy Center (capacity: 11,520)
- Conference: C-USA
- Nickname: Blue Raiders
- Colors: Royal blue and white
- Student section: The Blue Zoo
- All-time record: 1,054–464 (.694)

NCAA Division I tournament second round
- 1983, 1986, 2004, 2005, 2007, 2024

NCAA Division I tournament appearances
- 1983, 1984, 1985, 1986, 1988, 1996, 1998, 2004, 2005, 2006, 2007, 2009, 2010, 2011, 2012, 2013, 2014, 2016, 2021, 2023, 2024

Conference tournament champions
- 1983, 1984, 1985, 1986, 1988, 1998, 2004, 2005, 2006, 2007, 2008, 2009, 2010, 2013, 2014, 2016, 2021, 2023, 2024

Conference regular-season champions
- 1979, 1983, 1984, 1985, 1986, 1987, 1988, 1989, 1995, 1996, 1998, 2004, 2007, 2009, 2010, 2011, 2012, 2013, 2014, 2023, 2024, 2025

Conference division champions
- 2021

Uniforms
Home	Away

The Middle Tennessee Blue Raiders women's basketball team represents Middle Tennessee State University in women's basketball. The school competes in the Conference USA in Division I of the National Collegiate Athletic Association (NCAA). The Blue Raiders play home basketball games at Murphy Center in Murfreesboro, Tennessee.

== History ==
As of the end of the 2024-25 season, the Blue Raiders have an all-time record of 1,054–464 in 51 seasons. They are coached by Rick Insell, in his 21st year at MT. They played in the Ohio Valley Conference from 1978 to 2000, the Sun Belt Conference from 2000 to 2013, and Conference USA since 2013.

On January 23rd, 2026, Rick Insell eclipsed 500 wins as the head coach of the Lady Raiders. He becomes the 6th active head coach in the nation with 500+ wins, and becomes the first head coach in basketball history to have both 500 coaching wins at the NCAA D1 level and high school level.

=== Year-by-year results ===
Season	Coach	Record	Conference record	Postseason result
1975–76	Pat Jones	15–9	n/a	n/a
1976–77	Pat Jones	20–5	n/a	n/a
1977–78	Pat Sarver	15–13	n/a	n/a
1978–79	Larry Joe Inman	14–13	6–4	n/a
1979–80	Larry Joe Inman	23–10	10–1	n/a
1980–81	Larry Joe Inman	16–13	6–3	n/a
1981–82	Larry Joe Inman	20–5	9–3	n/a
1982–83	Larry Joe Inman	26–5	10–0	NCAA second round
1983–84	Larry Joe Inman	19–10	12–2	NCAA first round
1984–85	Larry Joe Inman	23–7	13–1	NCAA first round
1985–86	Larry Joe Inman	20–10	13–1	NCAA second round
1986–87	Jim Davis	19–8	12–2	n/a
1987–88	Lewis Bivens	22–8	12–2	NCAA first round
1988–89	Lewis Bivens	21–6	10–2	n/a
1989–90	Lewis Bivens	11–17	7–5	n/a
1990–91	Lewis Bivens	14–14	8–4	n/a
1991–92	Lewis Bivens	19–9	10–4	n/a
1992–93	Lewis Bivens	21–7	13–3	n/a
1993–94	Lewis Bivens	21–7	11–5	n/a
1994–95	Lewis Bivens	19–9	12–4	n/a
1995–96	Lewis Bivens	24–6	13–3	NCAA first round
1996–97	Lewis Bivens	10–20	7–11	n/a
1997–98	Stephany Smith	18–12	11–7	NCAA first round
1998–99	Stephany Smith	18–10	14–4	WNIT first round
1999–00	Stephany Smith	18–11	11–5	n/a
2000–01	Stephany Smith	17–13	9–7	WNIT first round
2001–02	Stephany Smith	16–13	7–7	n/a
2002–03	Stephany Smith	18–12	9–5	n/a
2003–04	Stephany Smith	24–8	10–4	NCAA second round
2004–05	Stephany Smith	24–9	11–3	NCAA second round
2005–06	Rick Insell	20–11	10–4	NCAA first round
2006–07	Rick Insell	30–4	18–0	NCAA second round
2007–08	Rick Insell	22–12	14–4	WNIT second round
2008–09	Rick Insell	28–6	17–1	NCAA first round
2009–10	Rick Insell	25–6	17–1	NCAA first round
2010–11	Rick Insell	23–8	14–2	NCAA first round
2011–12	Rick Insell	26–7	16–0	NCAA first round
2012–13	Rick Insell	25–8	17–3	NCAA first round
2013–14	Rick Insell	29–5	15–1	NCAA first round
2014–15	Rick Insell	24–10	14–4	WNIT quarterfinals
2015–16	Rick Insell	24–9	15–3	NCAA first round
2016–17	Rick Insell	23–11	15–3	WNIT third round
2017–18	Rick Insell	18–12	10–6	WNIT first round
2018–19	Rick Insell	23–11	11–5	WNIT second round
2019–20	Rick Insell	21–9	13–5	n/a
2020–21	Rick Insell	17–8	12–4	NCAA first round
2021–22	Rick Insell	27–8	14–4	WNIT semifinals
2022–23	Rick Insell	28–5	18–2	NCAA first round
2023–24	Rick Insell	30–5	16–0	NCAA second round
2024–25	Rick Insell	26–9	16–2	WBIT first round
2025–26	Rick Insell	17–15	11–7	WNIT Super Sixteen

== Postseason results ==
=== NCAA Division I ===
The Blue Raiders have appeared in the NCAA Tournament 21 times. Their overall record is 6-21.

Year	Seed	Round	Opponent	Result
1983	#9	Opening round First round	#8 Jackson State #1 Louisiana Tech	W 64–61; L 59–91
1984	#6	First round	#3 Georgia	L 52–70
1985	#5	First round	#4 Western Kentucky	L 83–90
1986	#10	First round Second round	#7 South Carolina #2 LSU	W 78–77; L 65–78
1988	#10	First round	#7 Kansas	L 75–81
1996	#13	First round	#4 Kansas	L 57–72
1998	#15	First round	#2 Duke	L 67–92
2004	#13	First round Second round	#4 North Carolina #5 Notre Dame	W 67–62; L 46–59
2005	#12	First round Second round	#5 NC State #4 Texas Tech	W 60–58; L 69–80
2006	#12	First round	#5 Utah	L 71–76
2007	#5	First round Second round	#12 Gonzaga #13 Marist	W 85–46; L 59–73
2009	#8	First round	#9 Michigan State	L 59–60
2010	#10	First round	#7 Mississippi State	L 64–68
2011	#11	First round	#6 Georgia	L 41–56
2012	#10	First round	#7 Vanderbilt	L 46–60
2013	#12	First round	#5 Louisville	L 49–74
2014	#8	First round	#9 Oregon State	L 36–55
2016	#12	First round	#5 Florida State	L 55–72
2021	#14	First round	#3 Tennessee	L 62–87
2023	#11	First round	#6 Colorado	L 60–82
2024	#11	First round Second round	#6 Louisville #3 LSU	W 71–69; L 58–83

=== WNIT results ===
The Blue Raiders have appeared in the Women's National Invitation Tournament (WNIT) nine times. Their overall record is 12-8.

Year	Round	Opponent	Result
1999	First round	Memphis	L 71-81
2001	First round	Indiana	L 63-66
2008	First round Second round	Western Carolina; Kentucky	W 104-69; L 66-68 ^{OT}
2015	First round Second round Third round Quarterfinals	Ball State; Arkansas State; Ole Miss; Temple	W 69-58; W 70-60; W 82-70; L 57-69
2017	First round Second round Third round	Morehead State; Wake Forest; Georgia Tech	W 67-58; W 73-66; L 57-70
2018	First round	Ball State	L 60-69
2019	First round Second round	IUPUI; Ohio	W 59-47; L 57-59
2022	First round Second round Third round Quarterfinals; Semifinals	Wofford; Wake Forest; Vanderbilt; Toledo; Seton Hall	W 86-56; W 67-55; W 55-53; W 73-71 ^{OT} L 73-74
2026	Second round Super Sixteen	St. Bonaventure; Cleveland State	W 69-50; TBD

=== WBIT results ===
The Blue Raiders have appeared in the Women's Basketball Invitation Tournament (WBIT) one time. Their record is 0-1.

Year	Seed	Round	Opponent	Result
2025	N/A	First round	#3 Belmont	L 51-64

== Notable players ==
- Alysha Clark (born 1987), American-Israeli basketball player for the Israeli team Elitzur Ramla and the Dallas Wings of the Women's National Basketball Association (WNBA)
- Cheyenne Parker-Tyus (born 1992), American basketball player for the Las Vegas Aces of the Women's National Basketball Association (WNBA).
