= 2022 Southern Conference women's basketball tournament =

- Classification: Division I
- Season: 2021–22
- Teams: 8
- Site: Harrah's Cherokee Center; Asheville, North Carolina
- Television: Nexstar, ESPN+

2021–22 Southern Conference women's basketball standings
	Conf.				Overall
Team	W		L	PCT	W		L	PCT
Mercer †	13	–	1	.929	23	–	7	.767
Wofford	11	–	3	.786	17	–	14	.548
Furman	10	–	4	.714	20	–	14	.588
Samford	7	–	7	.500	13	–	17	.433
UNC Greensboro	5	–	9	.357	9	–	19	.321
Chattanooga	5	–	9	.357	7	–	23	.233
East Tennessee State	5	–	9	.357	6	–	22	.214
Western Carolina	0	–	14	.000	7	–	23	.233
† 2022 SoCon Tournament winner

The 2022 Southern Conference women's basketball tournament was the postseason women's basketball tournament for the Southern Conference (SoCon) for the 2021–22 season. All tournaments games were played at the Harrah's Cherokee Center in Asheville, North Carolina, from March 3 to 6, 2022. The winner of the tournament received the conference's automatic bid to the 2022 NCAA Division I women's basketball tournament.

== Seeds ==
Teams are seeded by record within the conference, with a tiebreaker system to seed teams with identical conference records.

Seed	School	Conf	Overall	Tiebreaker
#1	Mercer	13–1	20–6	
#2	Wofford	11–3	16–12	
#3	Furman	10–4	17–13	
#4	Samford	7–7	12–16	
#5	UNC Greensboro	5–9	9–18	3–1 vs. Chattanooga & East Tennessee State
#6	Chattanooga	5–9	7–22	2–2 vs. UNC Greensboro & East Tennessee State
#7	East Tennessee State	5–9	6–21	1–3 vs. UNC Greensboro & Chattanooga
#8	Western Carolina	0–14	7–22	

== Schedule ==
All tournament games are streamed on ESPN+. The championship is televised across the region on select Nexstar stations and simulcast on ESPN+.

Session	Game	Time	Matchup	Television	Attendance
Quarterfinals – Thursday, March 3
1	1	Noon	No. 1 Mercer 85 vs. No. 8 Western Carolina 46	ESPN+	
1	2	2:15 PM	No. 4 Samford 59 vs. No. 5 UNCG 40	ESPN+	
2	3	5:00 PM	No. 2 Wofford vs. #7 ETSU	ESPN+	
2	4	7:15 PM	No. 3 Furman vs. No. 6 Chattanooga	ESPN+	
Semifinals – Friday, March 4
3	5	Noon	No. 1 Mercer 65vs. No. 4 Samford 35	ESPN+	
3	6	2:15 PM	No. 2 Wofford 59 vs. No. 3 Furman 64	ESPN+	
Championship Game – Sunday, March 6
4	7	Noon	No. 1 Mercer 73 vs. No. 3 Furman 54	ESPN+/Nexstar	
Game times in EST. Rankings denote tournament seeding.

== Bracket ==
- All times are Eastern.

Quarterfinals; Thursday, March 3, 2022; ESPN+
1	Mercer	85
8	Western Carolina	46
4	Samford	59
5	UNCG	40
2	Wofford	66
7	ETSU	54
3	Furman	70*
6	Chattanooga	63

Semifinals; Friday, March 4, 2022; ESPN+
1	Mercer	65
4	Samford	35
2	Wofford	59
3	Furman	64

Championship game Sunday, March 6, 2022; ESPN+/Nexstar
1	Mercer	73
3	Furman	54

== See also ==
- 2022 Southern Conference men's basketball tournament
