= 2021–22 NCAA Division I women's basketball season =

American women's college basketball season

- Preseason AP No. 1: South Carolina Gamecocks
- Regular season: November 9, 2021 – March 6, 2022
- NCAA Tournament: 2022
- Tournament dates: March 18 – April 3, 2022
- National Championship: Target Center; Minneapolis, Minnesota
- NCAA Champions: South Carolina Gamecocks
- Other champions: South Dakota State Jackrabbits (WNIT); Saint Mary's Gaels (WBI)
- Player of the Year (Naismith, Wooden): Aliyah Boston, South Carolina Gamecocks (Naismith, Wade, Wooden)

The 2021–22 NCAA Division I women's basketball season began on November 9, 2021. The regular season ended on March 6, 2022, with the 2022 NCAA Division I women's basketball tournament beginning on March 18, and ending with the championship game at the Target Center in Minneapolis on April 3.

== Rule changes ==
The following rule changes were recommended by the NCAA Basketball Rules Committee and approved by the Playing Rules Oversight Panel for the 2021–22 season:

- The three-point line was moved to the FIBA standard of 6.75 meters (22 ft 2 in) (6.6 meters (21 ft 8 in) in the corners), matching the distance used in NCAA men's basketball since 2019–20 in Division I and 2020–21 in Divisions II and III.
- Live statistics may be transmitted to the bench area for coaching purposes.
- In an experimental rule, conferences could apply for an NCAA waiver to allow transmission of live video feeds to the bench in conference games. This was still prohibited during nonconference games. (Previously, only preloaded video had been allowed in the bench area.)
- The following adjustments were made to reply review rules:
  - Officials can use replay to review any out-of-bounds play, regardless of the number of players involved. Previously, only deflections involving two players could be reviewed.
  - Coaches may request review of the result of a play involving the restricted area or lower defensive box at any time in the game. Previously, this play could only be reviewed by officials in the last two minutes of the game (or at the same time in an overtime period). An unsuccessful coach-initiated review results in that team losing a timeout.
  - Officials can now use replay to determine whether a basket should count when a player commits a foul away from the ball. Coaches may request this review at any time (at the cost of a timeout if the review is unsuccessful); officials can initiate a review on their own only in the last two minutes of the game (or overtime period).

== Season headlines ==
Two of the most significant developments impacting the 2021–22 season took place before the end of the 2020–21 school year, with one occurring before the start of the 2020–21 basketball season.

- On October 14, 2020, the NCAA announced that all student-athletes in winter sports during the 2020–21 school year, including men's and women's basketball, would receive an extra year of athletic eligibility.
- On April 15, 2021, the NCAA Division I Council adopted legislation that extended the so-called "one-time transfer exception" to all D-I sports, with the Division I board of directors ratifying this on April 28. This allows student-athletes in baseball, men's and women's basketball, football, and men's ice hockey to transfer one time without having to sit out a year, placing them under the same transfer regulations that previously applied to all other D-I sports.

Other news:

- May 6, 2021 – The University of Hartford's governing board voted to begin the process of transitioning the school's athletic program from Division I to NCAA Division III. The plan calls for the following steps:
  - January 2022: Formal request for reclassification with the NCAA.
  - 2022–23: No athletic scholarships will be awarded to incoming students.
  - 2023–24: Become a provisional member in a D-III conference to be determined; transition remaining students off athletic scholarships by the end of that school year.
  - 2024–25: Become a full member of the aforementioned D-III conference.
  - 2025–26: Full D-III membership.
- July 21 – The Houston Chronicle reported that Oklahoma and Texas had approached the Southeastern Conference about the possibility of joining that league, and that an announcement could come in early August. The SEC and both schools refused comment on this report, but did not issue definitive denials.
- July 26 – Oklahoma and Texas notified the Big 12 Conference that the two schools do not wish to extend their grant of television rights beyond the 2024–25 athletic year and intend to leave the conference.
- July 27 – Oklahoma and Texas reached out to the SEC about acceptance into the conference in 2025.
- July 28 – The Big 12 sent a cease-and-desist letter to ESPN, accusing the network of tortious interference by working with other conferences attempting to lure Big 12 members in a bid to ease Oklahoma's and Texas' exits for the SEC. The network denied the allegations.
- July 29 – The presidents and chancellors of the 14 current SEC members voted unanimously to extend invitations to Oklahoma and Texas, effective in 2025.
- July 30 – Oklahoma and Texas formally accepted the SEC's invitations.
- August 3 – An independent review commissioned by the NCAA and conducted by the law firm Kaplan Hecker & Fink following the controversy that erupted on social media over the disparities in amenities between the Division I men's and women's basketball tournaments was issued. Among the recommendations:
  - The men's and women's Final Fours should be a combined event held at a single site.
  - The "March Madness" branding, previously used only for the men's tournament, should be extended to the women's tournament. The NCAA had already announced that it would do so before the report was issued.
  - The women's tournament field should be expanded to 68 teams to match the men's tournament.
  - Media rights for the women's tournament, currently bundled with rights for more than two dozen other NCAA championships and sold separately from the men's tournament, should be decoupled from those other championships once the current contract for those championships expires.
  - If possible, the NCAA's current contract with CBS and Turner to broadcast the men's tournament, which gives said media companies control of sponsorships for all NCAA championship events—even those broadcast by other entities—should be renegotiated in order to make it easier for companies to sponsor NCAA championships other than the men's tournament.
  - The current system by which a significant amount of revenue from the men's tournament is returned to Division I members should be extended to the women's tournament.
- September 3
  - Multiple media outlets reported that the Big 12 was on the verge of inviting four schools—American Athletic Conference members Cincinnati, Houston, and UCF, plus BYU, a West Coast Conference member and an FBS independent in football. All four schools were reportedly preparing membership applications, and their future entrance could be approved as early as the next scheduled meeting of Big 12 presidents on September 10. The entry timeline was uncertain at the time of the report, but would most likely be in 2024.
  - Baylor announced that basketball, soccer, and volleyball, the last three Baylor women's sports still using the "Lady Bears" nickname, would drop "Lady" effective immediately. The soccer and volleyball teams had changed their social media accounts to reflect this change several days earlier.
- September 10 – BYU, Cincinnati, Houston, and UCF were officially announced as incoming Big 12 members no later than 2024–25.
- October 18 – Yahoo Sports reported that The American was preparing to receive applications from six of the 14 members of Conference USA—Charlotte, Florida Atlantic, North Texas, Rice, UAB, and UTSA.
- October 19 – ESPN reported that all six C-USA members named in Yahoo Sports' report had submitted applications to The American, and that each would receive a formal letter by the end of that week (October 22) detailing the terms of expansion.
- October 21 – The six aforementioned C-USA members were announced as incoming members of The American at a date to be determined.
- October 22 – The Action Network reported that C-USA member Southern Miss had accepted an invitation to join the Sun Belt Conference in 2023, though no formal announcement had then been made. The report added that the Sun Belt was preparing to add two other C-USA members, Marshall and Old Dominion, as well as FCS program James Madison. At the time, some formal announcements of new members were expected on October 25, but a Marshall announcement was likely to wait until after the school announced its new president on October 28. The report also indicated that the Sun Belt would expel its two full non-football members, Little Rock and UT Arlington, after the 2022–23 season.
- October 26 – Southern Miss was officially announced as a Sun Belt member, effective no later than July 2023. In other Sun Belt realignment news, it was reported that Old Dominion's arrival would be announced later that week, and that James Madison's board had scheduled an emergency meeting on October 29 (presumably to discuss a Sun Belt invitation).
- October 27 – Old Dominion was officially announced as a Sun Belt member, also effective no later than July 2023. This marked ODU's return to that conference after an absence of more than 30 years.
- October 30 – The day after both the Sun Belt Conference and Marshall issued tweets indicating that the Thundering Herd had accepted a Sun Belt invitation, this move was officially announced.
- November 5 – Conference USA, which had nine of its schools depart to other conferences, announced that ASUN Conference members Jacksonville State and Liberty and Western Athletic Conference members New Mexico State and Sam Houston would join C-USA no later than July 2023.
- November 6 – James Madison made its move to the Sun Belt official, initially effective no later than July 2023.
- November 12
  - The WAC announced that Incarnate Word would join from the Southland Conference in July 2022.
  - Utah governor Spencer Cox signed a bill passed by the Utah State Legislature that changed the name of Dixie State University to Utah Tech University, effective in the 2022–23 school year. The nickname of Trailblazers was not affected.
- November 16
  - The Atlantic 10 Conference announced that Loyola Chicago would join from the Missouri Valley Conference after the 2021–22 season.
  - CBS Sports reported that the MVC had entered into talks with three schools regarding future membership—Summit League member Kansas City, Ohio Valley Conference member Murray State, and non-football Sun Belt member UT Arlington. The report indicated that the latter two schools were seen as the strongest candidates, but all three were likely to receive invitations in the coming months.
- November 17 – The NCAA announced that the women's tournament would expand from 64 to 68 teams, effective with the 2022 tournament. This was another recommendation made in the August 2021 gender equity report. For the 2022 tournament only, the four extra games, held using the same format as the existing men's First Four, will be held on campuses of teams seeded in the top 16. From 2023 on, the women's First Four will be held at a neutral site to be determined.
- December 9 – The other Sun Belt member without a football program, Little Rock, announced that it would join the Ohio Valley Conference on July 1, 2022.
- January 7, 2022 – Murray State was announced as a new member of the MVC, effective July 1.
- January 21 – UT Arlington announced it would return to the WAC, in which it had been a member in the 2012–13 school year, effective July 1.
- January 25 – The Colonial Athletic Association announced that it would add three members effective that July—Big South Conference member Hampton, Metro Atlantic Athletic Conference member Monmouth, and Stony Brook, a full member of the America East Conference whose football team was already a member of the legally separate entity of CAA Football.
- January 26 – UIC was announced as a new member of the MVC, effective July 1.
- February 2 – The Sun Belt and James Madison both reported the latter's entry to the conference would be on July 1, rather than 2023.
- February 7 – The University of Southern Indiana, then a member of the Division II Great Lakes Valley Conference, announced that it would begin a transition to Division I in 2022–23, with a D-I conference affiliation to be announced in the coming days. A committee report issued in January indicated three leagues believed to be the ASUN Conference, Horizon League, and Ohio Valley Conference were possible landing spots.
- February 9 – Southern Indiana was announced as a new member of the OVC, effective July 1.
- February 11 – Marshall, Old Dominion, and Southern Miss, which were initially announced as moving from C-USA to the Sun Belt no later than 2023, jointly announced that they intended to leave C-USA later in July. All three schools claimed that in December 2021, they had notified C-USA of their intent to leave C-USA after the 2021–22 school year, but that C-USA did not attempt to negotiate a resolution to this issue. C-USA had stated in late January that it expected the three departing schools to remain in the conference through 2022–23.
- February 22 – The CAA announced that North Carolina A&T would join from the Big South Conference in non-football sports on July 1. (The NCA&T football team remained as a Big South affiliate for the 2022 season and is to join CAA Football in 2023.)
- February 23
  - Marshall sued C-USA in a local court in an attempt to make its planned move to the Sun Belt Conference in July.
  - The OVC announced the entry of another Division II upgrader, Lindenwood, also in July.
- March 1 – While not directly related to basketball, the Sun Belt Conference's release of its 2022 football schedule notably included all three schools set to move from C-USA (Marshall, Old Dominion, Southern Miss). The SBC release did not mention the ongoing dispute between C-USA and the three schools, or the prospect of those schools being unable to join for the 2022–23 school year.
- March 29
  - Conference USA, Marshall, Old Dominion, and Southern Miss issued a joint statement that all parties had reached a settlement that allowed the three schools to join the Sun Belt Conference in July 2022.
  - The America East Conference announced that Bryant would join from the Northeast Conference on July 1, 2022.
- April 5 – The Northeast Conference announced the addition of then-current Division II member Stonehill, effective July 1, 2022.
- May 2 – Mount St. Mary's announced it would join the Metro Atlantic beginning July 1, 2022.
- May 6 – Queens University of Charlotte, a member of the Division II South Atlantic Conference, announced it would join the ASUN on July 1, 2022.

=== Milestones and records ===
- January 16 and 20 – Caitlin Clark of Iowa recorded consecutive 30-point triple-doubles against Nebraska and Minnesota, becoming the first NCAA Division I player of either sex to accomplish this feat. Clark was also the first women's player in Big Ten Conference history to record consecutive triple-doubles regardless of scoring total.
- January 23 – Ayoka Lee of Kansas State broke the Division I women's single-game scoring record with 61 points in a 94–65 Wildcat win over No. 14 Oklahoma.
- February 8 – Villanova defeated UConn 72–69 in Hartford, Connecticut. This was the first regular-season conference loss for the Huskies since a loss to Notre Dame in March 2013, in the final season for both teams as members of the original Big East Conference. UConn's conference winning streak ended at 145 games in regular-season play, a Division I women's record, and 169 when including conference tournament games (with the latter streak starting after UConn lost to Notre Dame in the 2013 Big East tournament final).
- February 28 – Macee Williams of IUPUI was named Horizon League player of the year for the fourth straight season, making her only the fourth D-I women's player to be a four-time conference player of the year.
- March 18 – In the first round of the NCAA tournament, overall top seed South Carolina defeated Howard 79–21, with Howard's total being a new record for lowest team score in any D-I women's tournament game. The Gamecocks also led the Bison 44–4 at halftime, with Howard's score also being the lowest in a half in tournament history.
- Fresno State's Haley Cavinder ended the season with a new D-I single-season record for free throw percentage at 97.3%.
- Caitlin Clark also ended the season as the first woman to lead Division I in per-game scoring and assists in the same season.
- Iowa also became the first D-I men's or women's program with the national leaders in scoring, assists, and field goal percentage in the same season, with Monika Czinano leading in the last statistic.

== Conference membership changes ==
Eleven schools joined new conferences for the 2021–22 season, including St. Thomas that is transitioning directly from NCAA Division III.

School	Former conference	New conference
Abilene Christian	Southland Conference	Western Athletic Conference
Bethune–Cookman	Mid-Eastern Athletic Conference	Southwestern Athletic Conference
Central Arkansas	Southland Conference	ASUN Conference
Eastern Kentucky	Ohio Valley Conference	ASUN Conference
Florida A&M	Mid-Eastern Athletic Conference	Southwestern Athletic Conference
Jacksonville State	Ohio Valley Conference	ASUN Conference
Lamar	Southland Conference	Western Athletic Conference
North Carolina A&T	Mid-Eastern Athletic Conference	Big South Conference
St. Thomas	Minnesota Intercollegiate Athletic Conference (D-III)	Summit League
Sam Houston	Southland Conference	Western Athletic Conference
Stephen F. Austin	Southland Conference	Western Athletic Conference

== Arenas ==
=== New arenas ===
- This is the first season for High Point at the 4,500-seat Qubein Center (full name: Nido and Mariana Qubein Arena and Conference Center). The new arena was originally intended to open for the 2020–21 season, but was delayed due to COVID-19 issues. The facility officially opened on the weekend of September 24–26; the first women's game was an exhibition against Division II Mount Olive on November 5, 2021, the day after High Point's men played an exhibition at the new arena against the same school. The regular-season opener was a men's and women's doubleheader against nearby Elon on November 9.
- This is the first season for Idaho at the new 4,200-seat Idaho Central Credit Union Arena. The first women's game in the new arena was an exhibition against NAIA member Whitman on November 7, won 64–50 by the Vandals. The first women's regular-season game was on November 14 when the Vandals lost 66–46 to San Diego.

=== Arena of new D-I team ===
- St. Thomas plays at its existing on-campus facility, Schoenecker Arena (capacity 1,800).

=== Arenas closing ===
The following D-I programs planned to open new arenas for the 2022–23 season. All will move within their current campuses unless otherwise indicated.

- Alabama A&M will leave Elmore Gymnasium for the new Alabama A&M Events Center; the venue is scheduled to open in July 2022.
- Austin Peay planned to leave the on-campus Winfield Dunn Center for the new F&M Bank Arena in downtown Clarksville, Tennessee. However, construction delays led to this move being put off until 2023–24.
- Georgia State will leave GSU Sports Arena for a facility tentatively named Georgia State Arena.
- Texas will leave the Frank Erwin Center, which will be demolished to accommodate an expansion of the university's medical school, for the Moody Center.
- Vermont will leave Patrick Gymnasium for the Tarrant Event Center.

== Season outlook ==
=== Pre-season polls ===
The top 25 from the AP and USA Today Coaches Polls.

AP
Ranking	Team
1	South Carolina (14)
2	UConn (10)
3	Stanford (5)
4	Maryland
5	NC State
6	Louisville
7	Baylor
8	Indiana
9	Iowa
10	Oregon
11	Michigan
12	Iowa State
13	Kentucky
14	Oregon State
15	Tennessee
16	Florida State
17	Ohio Stateт
18	Georgia Techт
19	West Virginia
20	UCLA
21	South Florida
22	Arizona
23	Texas A&M
24	Virginia Tech
25	Texas

USA Today Coaches
Ranking	Team
1	South Carolina (13)
2	Stanfordт (13)
3	UConnт (6)
4	NC State
5	Maryland
6	Louisville
7	Indiana
8	Baylor
9	Oregon
10	Michigan
11	Iowa
12	Tennessee
13	Kentucky
14	UCLA
15	Arizona
16	Iowa State
17	Texas A&M
18	Oregon State
19	Georgia
20	Georgia Tech
21	Texas
22	South Florida
23	West Virginia
24	Florida State
25	Ohio State

=== Regular season top 10 matchups ===
Rankings reflect the AP poll Top 25.

- November 9
  - No. 1 South Carolina defeated No. 5 NC State, 66–57 (Reynolds Coliseum, Raleigh, North Carolina)
- November 21
  - No. 3 Maryland defeated No. 6 Baylor, 79–76 (Xfinity Center, College Park, Maryland)
  - No. 1 South Carolina defeated No. 9 Oregon, 80–63 (Battle 4 Atlantis, Paradise Island, Nassau, Bahamas)
- November 22
  - No. 1 South Carolina defeated No. 2 UConn, 73–57 (Battle 4 Atlantis, Paradise Island, Nassau, Bahamas)
- November 25
  - No. 5 NC State defeated No. 2 Maryland, 78–60 (Baha Mar Hoops, Baha Mar Convention Center, Nassau, Bahamas)
  - No. 7 Stanford defeated No. 4 Indiana, 69–66 (Baha Mar Hoops, Baha Mar Convention Center, Nassau, Bahamas)
- November 27
  - No. 7 Stanford defeated No. 2 Maryland, 86–67 (Baha Mar Hoops, Baha Mar Convention Center, Nassau, Bahamas)
- December 2
  - No. 2 NC State defeated No. 6 Indiana, 66–58 (Simon Skjodt Assembly Hall, Bloomington, Indiana)
- December 12
  - No. 1 South Carolina defeated No. 8 Maryland, 66–59 (Colonial Life Arena, Columbia, South Carolina)
- December 18
  - No. 3 Stanford defeated No. 7 Tennessee, 74–63 (Thompson–Boling Arena, Knoxville, Tennessee)
- December 19
  - No. 6 Louisville defeated No. 7 UConn, 69–64 (Mohegan Sun Arena, Uncasville, Connecticut)
- December 21
  - No. 1 South Carolina defeated No. 2 Stanford, 65–61 (Colonial Life Arena, Columbia, South Carolina)
- January 2
  - No. 8 Indiana defeated No. 6 Maryland, 70–63^{OT} (Simon Skjodt Assembly Hall, Bloomington, Indiana)
- January 20
  - No. 4 NC State defeated No. 3 Louisville, 68–59 (Reynolds Coliseum, Raleigh, North Carolina)
- January 30
  - No. 2 Stanford defeated No. 8 Arizona, 75–69 (Maples Pavilion, Stanford, California)
- January 31
  - No. 6 Michigan defeated No. 5 Indiana, 65–50 (Crisler Center, Ann Arbor, Michigan)
- February 6
  - No. 10 UConn defeated No. 7 Tennessee, 75–56 (XL Center, Hartford, Connecticut)
- February 28
  - No. 5 Baylor defeated No. 8 Iowa State, 87–62 (Hilton Coliseum, Ames, Iowa)
- March 12
  - No. 7 Texas defeated No. 10 Iowa State, 82–73^{OT} (2022 Big 12 women's basketball tournament, Municipal Auditorium, Kansas City, Missouri)
- March 13
  - No. 7 Texas defeated No. 4 Baylor, 67–58 (2022 Big 12 Women's Basketball Tournament, Municipal Auditorium, Kansas City, Missouri)

== Regular season ==
=== Early season tournaments ===
The inaugural women's Battle 4 Atlantis will take place from November 20–22 and will include Buffalo, Minnesota, Oklahoma, Oregon, South Carolina, South Florida, Syracuse and UConn.

Name	Dates	Location	No. teams	Champion
Preseason WNIT	November	Bramlage Coliseum (Manhattan, KS); Reynolds Coliseum (Raleigh, NC)	8	None
Battle 4 Atlantis	November 20–22	Imperial Arena (Nassau, Bahamas)	8	South Carolina
Baha Mar Hoops Pink Flamingo	November 25–27	Baha Mar Convention Center (Nassau, Bahamas)	7	Indiana
Cancún Challenge	November 25–27	Moon Palace Golf & Spa Resort (Cancún, MX)	10	Baylor (Mayan); UCF (Riviera)
Paradise Jam tournament	November 25–27	Sports and Fitness Center (Saint Thomas, VI)	8	Arizona (Island); Texas A&M (Reef)
Daytona Beach Invitational	November 25–27	Ocean Center (Daytona Beach, FL)	10	
St Pete Showcase	November 25–27	McArthur Center (St. Petersburg, FL)	4	Purdue
South Point Thanksgiving Shootout	November 25–27	South Point Arena (Las Vegas, NV)	7	
San Juan Shootout	November 26–27	Coliseo Roberto Clemente (San Juan, PR)	10	
Goombay Splash	November 25–28	Gateway Christian Academy (Bimini, Bahamas)	3	
Gulf Coast Showcase	November 26–28	Hertz Arena (Estero, FL)	8	Iowa State
Holiday Hoops Classic	December 20–21	South Point Arena (Las Vegas, NV)	6	
West Palm Beach Invitational	December 20–22	Student Life Center (West Palm Beach, FL)	10	
Southland Basketball Tip-Off	January 3–5	Leonard E. Merrell Center (Katy, TX)	8	Canceled due to COVID-19 protocols in multiple programs

=== Upsets ===
An upset is a victory by an underdog team. In the context of NCAA Division I women's basketball, this generally constitutes an unranked team defeating a team currently ranked in the top 25. This list will highlight those upsets of ranked teams by unranked teams as well as upsets of No. 1 teams. Rankings are from the AP poll. Bold type indicates winning teams in "true road games"—i.e., those played on an opponent's home court (including secondary homes).

Winner	Score	Loser	Date	Tournament/event
**Auburn**	58–51	No. 18 Georgia Tech	November 21, 2021	
BYU	61–54	No. 17 Florida State	November 25, 2021	St. Pete Showcase
Missouri State	76–68	No. 24 Virginia Tech	November 26, 2021	San Juan Shootout
Kent State	75–69	No. 19 UCLA	November 26, 2021	Gulf Coast Showcase
Purdue	66–61	No. 17 Florida State	November 27, 2021	St. Pete Showcase
South Dakota State	76–66	No. 19 UCLA	November 27, 2021	Gulf Coast Showcase
BYU	58–57	No. 22 West Virginia	November 27, 2021	St. Pete Showcase
Notre Dame	64–62	No. 16 Oregon State	November 27, 2021	Daytona Beach Invitational
**UC Davis**	64–57	No. 18 Oregon	December 1, 2021	
**Princeton**	58–55	No. 22 Florida Gulf Coast	December 1, 2021	
Syracuse	97–91	No. 18 Ohio State	December 1, 2021	ACC–Big Ten Women's Challenge
UT Arlington	61–56	No. 13 South Florida	December 2, 2021	
Duke	79–64	No. 9 Iowa	December 2, 2021	ACC–Big Ten Women's Challenge
LSU	69–60	No. 14 Iowa State	December 2, 2021	Big 12/SEC Women's Challenge
**Georgia Tech**	55–54	No. 20 Georgia	December 5, 2021	Rivalry
**DePaul**	94–85	No. 14 Kentucky	December 9, 2021	
Georgia Tech	57–44	No. 3 UConn	December 9, 2021	
Oklahoma	99–91^{OT}	No. 16 BYU	December 10, 2021	
TCU	87–75	No. 18 Texas A&M	December 12, 2021	
Villanova	56–52	No. 23 Oregon State	December 12, 2021	
Ole Miss	61–53	No. 18 South Florida	December 21, 2021	West Palm Beach Invitational
**IUPUI**	74–73	No. 15 Iowa	December 21, 2021	
Virginia Tech	77–55	No. 15 Duke	December 30, 2021	
Kansas State	68–59	No. 10 Baylor	January 2, 2022	
Nebraska	79–58	No. 8 Michigan	January 4, 2022	
**Texas Tech**	74–61	No. 9 Texas	January 5, 2022	
**Northwestern**	77–69	No. 22 Iowa	January 6, 2022	
**Florida**	97–89^{2OT}	No. 25 Texas A&M	January 9, 2022	
USC	76–67	No. 4 Arizona	January 9, 2022	
**Kansas**	70–66^{OT}	No. 13 Texas	January 12, 2022	
**Virginia Tech**	65–54	No. 16 Duke	January 13, 2022	
Texas Tech	64–45	No. 25 Kansas State	January 15, 2022	
Oregon	68–66^{OT}	No. 7 Arizona	January 15, 2022	
Miami (FL)	46–45	No. 15 Georgia Tech	January 16, 2022	
UCF	67–51	No. 24 South Florida	January 16, 2022	Rivalry
Oregon	72–59	No. 9 UConn	January 17, 2022	
Oregon State	69–66^{OT}	No. 22 Colorado	January 17, 2022	
Ohio State	95–89	No. 12 Maryland	January 20, 2022	
Boston College	73–71	No. 19 Notre Dame	January 20, 2022	Rivalry
**Florida**	77–52	No. 23 Kentucky	January 20, 2022	
Arizona State	57–52^{OT}	No. 22 Colorado	January 21, 2022	
**Ole Miss**	63–54	No. 23 Kentucky	January 23, 2022	
Kansas State	94–65	No. 14 Oklahoma	January 23, 2022	
Florida	74–73	No. 11 LSU	January 23, 2022	
**North Carolina**	78–62	No. 21 Duke	January 27, 2022	Rivalry
Auburn	71–61	No. 4 Tennessee	January 27, 2022	
Arkansas	90–76	No. 12 LSU	January 27, 2022	
Florida	84–59	No. 7 Tennessee	February 3, 2022	
Portland	75–64	No. 16 BYU	February 3, 2022	
**Florida**	54–51	No. 14 Georgia	February 6, 2022	
Florida State	70–65	No. 20 Notre Dame	February 6, 2022	
Arizona State	55–49	No. 19 Oregon	February 6, 2022	
**Villanova**	72–69	No. 8 UConn	February 9, 2022	
Michigan State	63–57	No. 4 Michigan	February 10, 2022	Rivalry
Virginia Tech	73–63	No. 11 Georgia Tech	February 10, 2022	
Arizona State	81–77	No. 6 Arizona	February 11, 2022	Rivalry
**Stetson**	58–55	No. 22 Florida Gulf Coast	February 12, 2022	
Virginia	58–55	No. 23 North Carolina	February 13, 2022	Rivalry
Northwestern	71–69^{2OT}	No. 4 Michigan	February 13, 2022	
**Oregon State**	68–62	No. 24 Oregon	February 13, 2022	Rivalry
Nebraska	72–55	No. 5 Indiana	February 14, 2022	
**Texas Tech**	97–87	No. 15 Oklahoma	February 16, 2022	
Alabama	74–64	No. 12 Tennessee	February 17, 2022	
Auburn	65–60	No. 21 Georgia	February 20, 2022	
**Miami (FL)**	51–39	No. 16 Georgia Tech	February 20, 2022	
Washington State	72–67	No. 8 Arizona	February 20, 2022	
Colorado	86–83	No. 25 Oregon	February 23, 2022	
Vanderbilt	63–59	No. 15 Florida	February 24, 2022	
Florida State	65–63^{OT}	No. 22 Georgia Tech	February 24, 2022	
**UCLA**	64–46	No. 12 Arizona	February 24, 2022	
**Missouri**	78–73	No. 15 Florida	February 27, 2022	
Colorado	45–43	No. 14 Arizona	March 3, 2022	Pac-12 tournament
Alabama	74–62	No. 25 Georgia	March 3, 2022	SEC tournament
Ole Miss	70–60	No. 23 Florida	March 4, 2022	SEC tournament
Miami (FL)	61–59	No. 4 Louisville	March 4, 2022	ACC tournament
Kentucky	78–63	No. 6 LSU	March 4, 2022	SEC tournament
Nebraska	76–73	No. 10 Michigan	March 4, 2022	Big Ten tournament
Kentucky	83–74	No. 18 Tennessee	March 5, 2022	SEC tournament/Rivalry
**Kansas**	73–67	No. 19 Oklahoma	March 5, 2022	
Miami (FL)	57–54	No. 20 Notre Dame	March 5, 2022	ACC tournament
Kentucky	64–62	No. 1 South Carolina	March 6, 2022	SEC tournament
Gonzaga	71–59	No. 15 BYU	March 8, 2022	WCC tournament

In addition to the above listed upsets in which an unranked team defeated a ranked team, there have been five non-Division I teams to defeat a Division I team so far this season. Bold type indicates winning teams in "true road games"—i.e., those played on an opponent's home court (including secondary homes).

Winner	Score	Loser	Date	Tournament/event
**Coker** (Division II)	51–44	Winthrop	November 24, 2021	
**UNC Pembroke** (Division II)	65–45	Winthrop	November 27, 2021	
**Belmont Abbey** (Division II)	56–48	Charleston Southern	November 29, 2021	
**Freed–Hardeman** (NAIA)	71–62	North Alabama	November 29, 2021	
**Texas A&M International** (Division II)	68–55	Florida A&M	December 11, 2021	

=== Conference winners and tournaments ===
Each of the 32 Division I athletic conferences will end its regular season with a single-elimination tournament. The team with the best regular-season record in each conference receives the number one seed in each tournament, with tiebreakers used as needed in the case of ties for the top seeding. Unless otherwise noted, the winners of these tournaments will receive automatic invitations to the 2022 NCAA Division I women's basketball tournament.

Conference	Regular season first place	Conference Player of the Year	Conference Coach of the Year	Conference tournament	Tournament venue (city)	Tournament winner
America East Conference	Maine	Anne Simon, Maine	Amy Vachon, Maine	2022 America East women's basketball tournament	Campus sites	Albany
American Athletic Conference	UCF	Diamond Battles, UCF	Katie Abrahamson-Henderson, UCF	2022 American Athletic Conference women's basketball tournament	Dickies Arena (Fort Worth, TX)	UCF
ASUN Conference	Florida Gulf Coast (East); Jacksonville State (West) (Note: These conferences chose to seed their tournament by division, with both divisional champions being top seeds in different halves of the bracket.)	Kierstan Bell, Florida Gulf Coast	Karl Smesko, Florida Gulf Coast	2022 ASUN women's basketball tournament	Campus sites	Florida Gulf Coast
Atlantic 10 Conference	Dayton	Sam Breen, UMass	Shauna Green, Dayton	2022 Atlantic 10 women's basketball tournament	Chase Fieldhouse (Wilmington, DE)	UMass
Atlantic Coast Conference	NC State	Elizabeth Kitley, Virginia Tech	Wes Moore, NC State	2022 ACC women's basketball tournament	Greensboro Coliseum (Greensboro, NC)	NC State
Big 12 Conference	Baylor	NaLyssa Smith, Baylor	Brandon Schneider, Kansas	2022 Big 12 Conference women's basketball tournament	Municipal Auditorium (Kansas City, MO)	Texas
Big East Conference	UConn	Maddy Siegrist, Villanova	Denise Dillon, Villanova	2022 Big East women's basketball tournament	Mohegan Sun Arena (Uncasville, CT)	UConn
Big Sky Conference	Idaho State	Lianna Tillman, Sacramento State	Seton Sobolewski, Idaho State	2022 Big Sky Conference women's basketball tournament	Idaho Central Arena (Boise, ID)	Montana State
Big South Conference	Campbell (Note: Top seed in conference tournament.); Longwood	Akila Smith, Longwood	Becky Burke, USC Upstate	2022 Big South Conference women's basketball tournament	Bojangles Coliseum (Charlotte, NC)	Longwood
Big Ten Conference	Iowa; Ohio State	Caitlin Clark, Iowa	Kim Barnes Arico, Michigan	2022 Big Ten women's basketball tournament	Gainbridge Fieldhouse (Indianapolis, IN)	Iowa
Big West Conference	Hawaiʻi	Amy Atwell, Hawaiʻi	Laura Beeman, Hawaiʻi	2022 Big West Conference women's basketball tournament	Dollar Loan Center (Henderson, NV)	Hawaiʻi
Colonial Athletic Association	Drexel	Jasmine Dickey, Delaware	Amy Mallon, Drexel	2022 CAA women's basketball tournament	Daskalakis Athletic Center (Philadelphia, PA)	Delaware
Conference USA	Charlotte (East); Louisiana Tech (West)	Octavia Jett-Wilson, Charlotte	Cara Consuegra, Charlotte	2022 Conference USA women's basketball tournament	Ford Center at The Star (Frisco, TX)	Charlotte
Horizon League	IUPUI; Youngstown State	Macee Williams, IUPUI	John Barnes, Youngstown State	2022 Horizon League women's basketball tournament	Quarterfinals: Campus sites Semifinals and final: Indiana Farmers Coliseum (Indianapolis, IN)	IUPUI
Ivy League	Princeton	Abby Meyers, Princeton	Carla Berube, Princeton	2022 Ivy League women's basketball tournament	Lavietes Pavilion (Boston, MA)	Princeton
Metro Atlantic Athletic Conference	Fairfield	Lou Lopez Sénéchal, Fairfield	Joe Frager, Fairfield	2022 MAAC women's basketball tournament	Boardwalk Hall (Atlantic City, NJ)	Fairfield
Mid-American Conference	Toledo	Jordyn Dawson, Akron	Tricia Cullop, Toledo	2022 Mid-American Conference women's basketball tournament	Rocket Mortgage FieldHouse (Cleveland, OH)	Buffalo
Mid-Eastern Athletic Conference	Howard	Jaia Alexander, Coppin State	Laura Harper, Coppin State	2022 MEAC women's basketball tournament	Norfolk Scope (Norfolk, VA)	Howard
Missouri Valley Conference	Southern Illinois	Abby Brockmeyer, Southern Illinois	Cindy Stein, Southern Illinois	2022 Missouri Valley Conference women's basketball tournament	TaxSlayer Center (Moline, IL)	Illinois State
Mountain West Conference	UNLV	Desi-Rae Young, UNLV	Chris Gobrecht, Air Force	2022 Mountain West Conference women's basketball tournament	Thomas & Mack Center (Paradise, NV)	UNLV
Northeast Conference	Fairleigh Dickinson	Madison Stanley, Fairleigh Dickinson	Angelika Szumilo, Fairleigh Dickinson	2022 Northeast Conference women's basketball tournament	Campus sites	Mount St. Mary's
Ohio Valley Conference	Belmont	Katelyn Young, Murray State	Bart Brooks, Belmont	2022 Ohio Valley Conference women's basketball tournament	Ford Center (Evansville, IN)	Belmont
Pac-12 Conference	Stanford	Haley Jones, Stanford (coaches); Cameron Brink, Stanford (media)	Tara VanDerveer, Stanford (coaches); Kamie Ethridge, Washington State (media)	2022 Pac-12 Conference women's basketball tournament	Michelob Ultra Arena (Paradise, NV)	Stanford
Patriot League	Holy Cross	Avery LaBarbera, Holy Cross	Maureen Magarity, Holy Cross	2022 Patriot League women's basketball tournament	Campus sites	American
Southeastern Conference	South Carolina	Aliyah Boston, South Carolina	Dawn Staley, South Carolina	2022 SEC women's basketball tournament	Bridgestone Arena (Nashville, TN)	Kentucky
Southern Conference	Mercer	Tierra Hodges, Furman	Susie Gardner, Mercer	2022 Southern Conference women's basketball tournament	Harrah's Cherokee Center (Asheville, NC)	Mercer
Southland Conference	Houston Baptist	Timia Jefferson, Houston Baptist	Donna Finnie, Houston Baptist	2022 Southland Conference women's basketball tournament	Leonard E. Merrell Center (Katy, TX)	Incarnate Word
Southwestern Athletic Conference	Jackson State	Ameshya Williams-Holliday, Jackson State	Tomekia Reed, Jackson State	2022 SWAC women's basketball tournament	Bartow Arena (Birmingham, AL)	Jackson State
Summit League	South Dakota; South Dakota State	Chloe Lamb, South Dakota	Aaron Johnston, South Dakota State	2022 Summit League women's basketball tournament	Denny Sanford Premier Center (Sioux Falls, SD)	South Dakota
Sun Belt Conference	Troy	Starr Jacobs, UT Arlington	Shereka Wright, UT Arlington	2022 Sun Belt Conference women's basketball tournament	Pensacola Bay Center (Pensacola, FL)	UT Arlington
West Coast Conference	BYU	Shaylee Gonzales, BYU	Jeff Judkins, BYU	2022 West Coast Conference women's basketball tournament	Orleans Arena (Paradise, NV)	Gonzaga
Western Athletic Conference	Stephen F. Austin	Caitlyn Harper, California Baptist	Mark Kellogg, Stephen F. Austin	2022 WAC women's basketball tournament	Orleans Arena (Paradise, NV)	Stephen F. Austin

=== Statistical leaders ===
Includes postseason games. Division I record in bold.

**Points per game**			**Rebounds per game**			**Assists per game**			**Steals per game**		
Player	School	PPG	Player	School	RPG	Player	School	APG	Player	School	SPG
Caitlin Clark	Iowa	27.0	Aneesah Morrow	DePaul	13.8	Caitlin Clark	Iowa	8.0	Veronica Burton	Northwestern	4.03
Maddy Siegrist	Villanova	25.3	Aijha Blackwell	Missouri	13.0	Olivia Miles	Notre Dame	7.4	Angel Parker	Niagara	4.00
Jasmine Dickey	Delaware	25.3	Jada Dapaa	Saint Francis (PA)	12.6	Emily Ryan	Iowa State	7.1	Jordyn Cambridge	Vanderbilt	3.91
Dyaisha Fair	Buffalo	23.4	Josie Williams	Utah Valley	12.4	Lauren Park-Lane	Seton Hall	7.0	Camille Downs	Norfolk State	3.34
Cierra Hooks	Ohio	22.3	Aliyah Boston	South Carolina	12.4	McKenna Hofschild	Colorado State	6.5	Mackenzie DeWees	Quinnipiac	3.31

**Blocked shots per game**			**Field goal percentage**			**Three-point field goal percentage**			**Free throw percentage**		
Player	School	BPG	Player	School	FG%	Player	School	3FG%	Player	School	FT%
Lucy Cochrane	Portland	3.93	Monika Czinano	Iowa	67.89	Tess Amundsen	Cal State Northridge	49.12	Haley Cavinder	Fresno State	**97.32**
Brooke Flowers	Saint Louis	3.52	Celena Taborn	Butler	67.51	Taylor Mikesell	Ohio State	47.50	Kacie Borowicz	North Dakota	95.71
Tamari Key	Tennessee	3.50	Mya Berkman	Liberty	66.27	Hayley Frank	Missouri	46.24	Taylor Robertson	Oklahoma	92.80
Taiyanna Jackson	Kansas	3.06	Isnelle Natabou	Sacramento State	64.31	Kayla Spruill	La Salle	45.93	Rachel McLimore	IUPUI	92.59
Nancy Mulkey	Washington	3.00	Macee Williams	IUPUI	63.77	Kendall Spray	Florida Gulf Coast	45.58	Hannah Simental	Northern Iowa	90.60

== Postseason ==
=== NCAA tournament ===
==== Tournament upsets ====
For this list, an "upset" is defined as a win by a team seeded 5 or more spots below its defeated opponent.

Date	Winner	Score	Loser	Region	Round
March 18	Florida Gulf Coast (#12)	84–81	Virginia Tech (#5)	Spokane	First Round
March 19	Princeton (#11)	69–62	Kentucky (#6)	Bridgeport	First Round
March 19	Villanova (#11)	61–57	BYU (#6)	Wichita	First Round
March 19	Belmont (#12)	73–70^{2OT}	Oregon (#5)	Wichita	First Round
March 20	Creighton (#10)	64–62	Iowa (#2)	Greensboro	Second Round
March 20	South Dakota (#10)	61–47	Baylor (#2)	Wichita	Second Round
March 25	Creighton (#10)	76–68	Iowa State (#3)	Greensboro	Sweet 16

== Conference standings ==
2021–22 Atlantic 10 women's basketball standings
	Conf.				Overall
Team	W		L	PCT	W		L	PCT
Dayton	14	–	1	.933	25	–	6	.806
Rhode Island	12	–	2	.857	22	–	7	.759
UMass †	11	–	4	.733	26	–	7	.788
VCU	9	–	5	.643	16	–	12	.571
La Salle	9	–	6	.600	16	–	12	.571
Fordham	8	–	6	.571	18	–	11	.621
Saint Joseph's	7	–	8	.467	13	–	17	.433
Richmond	7	–	9	.438	16	–	14	.533
Davidson	6	–	10	.375	18	–	15	.545
Duquesne	6	–	10	.375	11	–	18	.379
Saint Louis	5	–	9	.357	9	–	18	.333
George Washington	4	–	11	.267	13	–	18	.419
St. Bonaventure	4	–	12	.250	12	–	16	.429
George Mason	3	–	12	.200	10	–	19	.345
† 2022 A10 Tournament winner

2021–22 ASUN women's basketball standings
	Conf.				Overall
Team	W		L	PCT	W		L	PCT
East
No. 23 Florida Gulf Coast †	15	–	1	.938	30	–	3	.909
Liberty	14	–	2	.875	28	–	5	.848
Stetson	11	–	5	.688	20	–	12	.625
Jacksonville	8	–	8	.500	16	–	13	.552
North Florida	5	–	11	.313	13	–	17	.433
Kennesaw State	5	–	11	.313	9	–	19	.321
West
Jacksonville State	13	–	3	.813	24	–	8	.750
North Alabama*	8	–	8	.500	13	–	16	.448
Eastern Kentucky	7	–	9	.438	15	–	16	.484
Lipscomb	5	–	11	.313	10	–	20	.333
Central Arkansas	4	–	12	.250	9	–	19	.321
Bellarmine*	1	–	15	.063	4	–	24	.143
† 2022 ASUN Tournament winner * ineligible for the 2022 NCAA tournament due to transition from Division II; Rankings from AP poll

2021–22 ACC women's basketball standings
	Conf.				Overall
Team	W		L	PCT	W		L	PCT
No. 3 NC State †	17	–	1	.944	32	–	4	.889
No. 4 Louisville	16	–	2	.889	29	–	5	.853
No. 17 North Carolina	13	–	5	.722	25	–	7	.781
No. 21 Notre Dame	13	–	5	.722	24	–	9	.727
No. 16 Virginia Tech	13	–	5	.722	23	–	10	.697
Georgia Tech	11	–	7	.611	21	–	11	.656
Boston College	10	–	8	.556	21	–	12	.636
Miami (FL)	10	–	8	.556	21	–	13	.618
Florida State	10	–	8	.556	17	–	14	.548
Duke	7	–	11	.389	17	–	13	.567
Wake Forest	4	–	14	.222	16	–	17	.485
Syracuse	4	–	14	.222	11	–	18	.379
Clemson	3	–	15	.167	10	–	21	.323
Pittsburgh	2	–	16	.111	11	–	19	.367
Virginia	2	–	16	.111	5	–	22	.185
† 2022 ACC tournament winner Rankings from AP poll

2021–22 America East Conference women's basketball standings
	Conf.				Overall
Team	W		L	PCT	W		L	PCT
Maine	15	–	3	.833	20	–	12	.625
Stony Brook*	14	–	4	.778	23	–	6	.793
Albany †	13	–	5	.722	23	–	10	.697
Vermont	13	–	5	.722	20	–	11	.645
NJIT	9	–	8	.529	15	–	15	.500
UMass Lowell	8	–	9	.471	11	–	16	.407
Binghamton	5	–	13	.278	9	–	20	.310
New Hampshire	4	–	12	.250	7	–	21	.250
Hartford	4	–	14	.222	4	–	26	.133
UMBC	2	–	14	.125	3	–	23	.115
† 2022 America East tournament winner *Ineligible for the AmEast Tournament due to a postseason ban imposed by the AmEast.

2021–22 American Athletic Conference women's basketball standings
	Conf.				Overall
Team	W		L	PCT	W		L	PCT
No. 24 UCF †	14	–	1	.933	26	–	4	.867
South Florida	12	–	3	.800	24	–	9	.727
Tulane	11	–	5	.688	21	–	10	.677
Temple	8	–	8	.500	13	–	15	.464
SMU	7	–	7	.500	14	–	15	.483
Houston	7	–	9	.438	18	–	16	.529
Memphis	6	–	9	.400	16	–	12	.571
Tulsa	5	–	8	.385	17	–	11	.607
Wichita State	5	–	11	.313	14	–	16	.467
East Carolina	4	–	11	.267	11	–	18	.379
Cincinnati	4	–	11	.267	11	–	17	.393
† 2022 AAC tournament winner Rankings from AP poll

2021–22 Big 12 Conference women's basketball standings
	Conf.				Overall
Team	W		L	PCT	W		L	PCT
No. 7 Baylor	15	–	3	.833	28	–	7	.800
No. 10 Iowa State	14	–	4	.778	28	–	7	.800
No. 6 Texas †	13	–	5	.722	29	–	7	.806
No. 22 Oklahoma	12	–	6	.667	25	–	9	.735
Kansas	11	–	7	.611	21	–	10	.677
Kansas State	9	–	9	.500	20	–	13	.606
West Virginia	7	–	11	.389	15	–	15	.500
Texas Tech	4	–	14	.222	11	–	19	.367
Oklahoma State	3	–	15	.167	9	–	20	.310
TCU	2	–	16	.111	6	–	22	.214
† 2022 Big 12 Tournament winner Rankings from AP poll

2021–22 Big East women's basketball standings
	Conf.				Overall
Team	W		L	PCT	W		L	PCT
No. 5 UConn †	16	–	1	.941	30	–	6	.833
Villanova	15	–	4	.789	24	–	9	.727
Creighton	15	–	5	.750	23	–	10	.697
DePaul	14	–	6	.700	22	–	11	.667
Marquette	13	–	7	.650	23	–	11	.676
Seton Hall	12	–	8	.600	24	–	13	.649
St. John's	7	–	12	.368	12	–	19	.387
Providence	6	–	14	.300	11	–	19	.367
Georgetown	4	–	15	.211	10	–	19	.345
Xavier	4	–	16	.200	9	–	21	.300
Butler	0	–	18	.000	1	–	27	.036
† 2022 Big East tournament winner Rankings from AP poll

2021–22 Big Sky women's basketball standings
	Conf.				Overall
Team	W		L	PCT	W		L	PCT
Idaho State	15	–	5	.750	19	–	12	.613
Montana State †	14	–	6	.700	22	–	13	.629
Southern Utah	14	–	6	.700	18	–	12	.600
Northern Arizona	12	–	8	.600	17	–	14	.548
Montana	12	–	8	.600	19	–	11	.633
Idaho	11	–	9	.550	14	–	18	.438
Sacramento State	10	–	10	.500	14	–	16	.467
Northern Colorado	9	–	11	.450	15	–	16	.484
Eastern Washington	7	–	13	.350	9	–	21	.300
Weber State	6	–	14	.300	11	–	20	.355
Portland State	0	–	20	.000	5	–	24	.172
† Big Sky tournament winner

2021–22 Big South women's basketball standings
	Conf.				Overall
Team	W		L	PCT	W		L	PCT
Campbell	15	–	3	.833	23	–	8	.742
Longwood †	15	–	3	.833	22	–	12	.647
USC Upstate	14	–	4	.778	22	–	8	.733
Gardner–Webb	13	–	5	.722	16	–	15	.516
High Point	13	–	5	.722	17	–	14	.548
North Carolina A&T	11	–	7	.611	14	–	15	.483
Hampton	8	–	9	.471	13	–	16	.448
Presbyterian	6	–	12	.333	12	–	18	.400
Winthrop	4	–	14	.222	6	–	24	.200
UNC Asheville	3	–	15	.167	10	–	22	.313
Radford	3	–	15	.167	7	–	23	.233
Charleston Southern	2	–	15	.118	2	–	27	.069
† 2022 Big South tournament winner

2021–22 Big Ten women's basketball standings
	Conf.				Overall
Team	W		L	PCT	W		L	PCT
No. 14 Ohio State	14	–	4	.778	25	–	7	.781
No. 8 Iowa †	14	–	4	.778	24	–	8	.750
No. 12 Michigan	13	–	4	.765	25	–	7	.781
No. 13 Maryland	13	–	4	.765	23	–	9	.719
No. 11 Indiana	11	–	5	.688	24	–	9	.727
Nebraska	11	–	7	.611	24	–	9	.727
Northwestern	8	–	8	.500	17	–	12	.586
Michigan State	8	–	9	.471	15	–	15	.500
Purdue	7	–	11	.389	17	–	15	.531
Minnesota	7	–	11	.389	15	–	18	.455
Penn State	5	–	13	.278	11	–	18	.379
Wisconsin	5	–	13	.278	8	–	21	.276
Rutgers	3	–	14	.176	11	–	20	.355
Illinois	1	–	13	.071	7	–	20	.259
† 2022 Big Ten tournament winner Rankings from AP poll

2021–22 Big West women's basketball standings
	Conf.				Overall
Team	W		L	PCT	W		L	PCT
Hawaiʻi †	13	–	3	.813	20	–	10	.667
UC Irvine	14	–	4	.778	21	–	12	.636
Long Beach State	12	–	6	.667	19	–	9	.679
UC Riverside	10	–	6	.625	14	–	11	.560
UC San Diego*	10	–	8	.556	13	–	14	.481
UC Santa Barbara	9	–	8	.529	15	–	12	.556
UC Davis	8	–	8	.500	15	–	13	.536
Cal State Fullerton	5	–	12	.294	11	–	18	.379
Cal State Northridge	5	–	12	.294	9	–	19	.321
Cal State Bakersfield	3	–	11	.214	5	–	20	.200
Cal Poly	2	–	13	.133	3	–	22	.120
† 2022 Big West tournament winner * ineligible for the 2022 NCAA tournament due to transition period

2021–22 Conference USA women's basketball standings
	Conf.				Overall
Team	W		L	PCT	W		L	PCT
East
Charlotte †	15	–	3	.833	22	–	10	.688
Middle Tennessee	14	–	4	.778	27	–	8	.771
Old Dominion	12	–	6	.667	24	–	10	.706
Western Kentucky	11	–	7	.611	18	–	12	.600
Marshall	10	–	8	.556	15	–	13	.536
FIU	6	–	12	.333	15	–	16	.484
Florida Atlantic	1	–	17	.056	5	–	25	.167
West
Louisiana Tech	11	–	7	.611	21	–	12	.636
North Texas	10	–	7	.588	17	–	13	.567
Southern Miss	9	–	8	.529	18	–	12	.600
Rice	8	–	9	.471	14	–	13	.519
UAB	8	–	10	.444	16	–	15	.516
UTEP	6	–	12	.333	14	–	15	.483
UTSA	3	–	14	.176	7	–	23	.233
† 2022 C-USA tournament winner

2021–22 CAA women's basketball standings
	Conf.				Overall
Team	W		L	PCT	W		L	PCT
Drexel	16	–	2	.889	28	–	6	.824
Delaware †	15	–	3	.833	25	–	7	.781
Towson	14	–	4	.778	24	–	8	.750
James Madison*	10	–	8	.556	14	–	15	.483
Elon	9	–	9	.500	17	–	12	.586
Charleston	9	–	9	.500	18	–	13	.581
Northeastern	8	–	10	.444	14	–	18	.438
William & Mary	5	–	13	.278	10	–	20	.333
Hofstra	4	–	14	.222	8	–	20	.286
UNC Wilmington	0	–	18	.000	3	–	26	.103
† 2022 CAA tournament winner *Ineligible for the CAA Tournament due to a postseason ban imposed by the CAA.

2021–22 Horizon League women's basketball standings
	Conf.				Overall
Team	W		L	PCT	W		L	PCT
IUPUI †	18	–	4	.818	24	–	5	.828
Youngstown State	18	–	4	.818	23	–	7	.767
Green Bay	15	–	4	.789	19	–	8	.704
Cleveland State	14	–	6	.700	21	–	9	.700
Northern Kentucky	14	–	6	.700	21	–	8	.724
Milwaukee	13	–	9	.591	14	–	16	.467
Oakland	11	–	9	.550	15	–	15	.500
Robert Morris	11	–	11	.500	13	–	15	.464
Purdue Fort Wayne	7	–	14	.333	7	–	21	.250
Wright State	3	–	18	.143	4	–	19	.174
UIC	1	–	20	.048	2	–	25	.074
Detroit Mercy	1	–	21	.045	1	–	27	.036
† 2022 Horizon League Tournament winner

2021–22 Ivy League women's basketball standings
	Conf.				Overall
Team	W		L	PCT	W		L	PCT
No. 25 Princeton †	14	–	0	1.000	25	–	5	.833
Columbia	12	–	2	.857	25	–	7	.781
Yale	9	–	5	.643	16	–	11	.593
Harvard	7	–	7	.500	13	–	14	.481
Penn	7	–	7	.500	12	–	14	.462
Cornell	4	–	10	.286	9	–	16	.360
Dartmouth	2	–	12	.143	3	–	23	.115
Brown	1	–	13	.071	6	–	20	.231
† 2022 Ivy League tournament winner Rankings from AP poll

2021–22 MAAC women's basketball standings
	Conf.				Overall
Team	W		L	PCT	W		L	PCT
Fairfield †	19	–	1	.950	25	–	7	.781
Quinnipiac	14	–	6	.700	21	–	12	.636
Manhattan	14	–	6	.700	21	–	11	.656
Niagara	11	–	9	.550	15	–	15	.500
Siena	10	–	10	.500	10	–	19	.345
Monmouth	9	–	11	.450	14	–	16	.467
Saint Peter's	9	–	11	.450	13	–	18	.419
Iona	8	–	12	.400	11	–	16	.407
Rider	7	–	13	.350	9	–	21	.300
Marist	6	–	14	.300	8	–	21	.276
Canisius	3	–	17	.150	6	–	25	.194
† 2022 MAAC tournament winner

2021–22 Mid-American Conference women's basketball standings
	Conf.				Overall
Team	W		L	PCT	W		L	PCT
Toledo	19	–	1	.950	29	–	6	.829
Buffalo †	16	–	4	.800	25	–	9	.735
Akron	13	–	7	.650	17	–	12	.586
Ball State	11	–	8	.579	20	–	13	.606
Northern Illinois	11	–	9	.550	14	–	15	.483
Kent State	10	–	10	.500	19	–	12	.613
Western Michigan	10	–	10	.500	16	–	14	.533
Bowling Green	10	–	10	.500	17	–	16	.515
Ohio	9	–	10	.474	15	–	15	.500
Miami (OH)	4	–	16	.200	8	–	21	.276
Eastern Michigan	4	–	16	.200	7	–	20	.259
Central Michigan	2	–	18	.100	4	–	25	.138
† 2022 MAC tournament winner

2021–22 MEAC women's basketball standings
	Conf.				Overall
Team	W		L	PCT	W		L	PCT
Howard †	11	–	3	.786	21	–	10	.677
Norfolk State	11	–	3	.786	17	–	12	.586
Morgan State	11	–	3	.786	18	–	8	.692
Coppin State	9	–	5	.643	15	–	13	.536
Maryland Eastern Shore	7	–	7	.500	12	–	16	.429
South Carolina State	4	–	10	.286	4	–	25	.138
North Carolina Central	3	–	11	.214	5	–	20	.200
Delaware State	0	–	14	.000	0	–	24	.000
† 2022 MEAC tournament winner

2021–22 Missouri Valley Conference women's basketball standings
	Conf.				Overall
Team	W		L	PCT	W		L	PCT
Southern Illinois	15	–	3	.833	21	–	10	.677
Missouri State	14	–	4	.778	25	–	8	.758
Northern Iowa	13	–	5	.722	23	–	11	.676
Illinois State †	12	–	6	.667	19	–	14	.576
Loyola Chicago	10	–	8	.556	18	–	12	.600
Valparaiso	9	–	9	.500	11	–	19	.367
Drake	9	–	9	.500	20	–	14	.588
Indiana State	5	–	13	.278	11	–	20	.355
Evansville	2	–	16	.111	8	–	22	.267
Bradley	1	–	17	.056	4	–	24	.143
† 2022 MVC tournament winner

2021–22 Mountain West Conference women's basketball standings
	Conf.				Overall
Team	W		L	PCT	W		L	PCT
UNLV †	15	–	3	.833	26	–	7	.788
New Mexico	14	–	4	.778	26	–	10	.722
Wyoming	11	–	6	.647	17	–	13	.567
Nevada	11	–	6	.647	20	–	13	.606
Air Force	11	–	7	.611	19	–	14	.576
Colorado State	9	–	9	.500	21	–	12	.636
San Diego State	8	–	10	.444	15	–	16	.484
Fresno State	7	–	10	.412	11	–	18	.379
Utah State	5	–	13	.278	11	–	19	.367
Boise State	4	–	13	.235	8	–	21	.276
San Jose State	2	–	16	.111	5	–	25	.167
† 2022 MW Tournament winner

2021–22 Northeast Conference women's basketball standings
	Conf.				Overall
Team	W		L	PCT	W		L	PCT
Fairleigh Dickinson	15	–	3	.833	19	–	12	.613
St. Francis Brooklyn	13	–	5	.722	17	–	10	.630
Mount St. Mary's †	11	–	7	.611	16	–	13	.552
Wagner	10	–	8	.556	17	–	12	.586
LIU	9	–	9	.500	9	–	18	.333
Saint Francis (PA)	8	–	10	.444	8	–	22	.267
Merrimack*	7	–	11	.389	9	–	17	.346
Bryant	6	–	12	.333	10	–	22	.313
Sacred Heart	6	–	12	.333	8	–	17	.320
Central Connecticut	5	–	13	.278	6	–	20	.231
† 2022 NEC tournament winner * ineligible for the 2022 NCAA tournament due to transition period

2021–22 Ohio Valley Conference women's basketball standings
	Conf.				Overall
Team	W		L	PCT	W		L	PCT
Belmont †	16	–	2	.889	23	–	8	.742
Tennessee Tech	14	–	4	.778	21	–	11	.656
Murray State	13	–	5	.722	22	–	10	.688
Austin Peay	11	–	7	.611	20	–	13	.606
Eastern Illinois	11	–	7	.611	16	–	14	.533
UT Martin	9	–	9	.500	12	–	18	.400
SIU Edwardsville	8	–	10	.444	13	–	18	.419
Tennessee State	6	–	12	.333	12	–	19	.387
Southeast Missouri State	2	–	16	.111	6	–	23	.207
Morehead State	0	–	18	.000	1	–	27	.036
† 2022 OVC tournament winner

2021–22 Pac-12 Conference women's basketball standings
	Conf.				Overall
Team	W		L	PCT	W		L	PCT
No. 2 Stanford †	16	–	0	1.000	32	–	4	.889
Oregon	11	–	6	.647	20	–	12	.625
Washington State	11	–	6	.647	19	–	11	.633
No. 19 Arizona	10	–	6	.625	21	–	8	.724
Colorado	9	–	7	.563	22	–	9	.710
Utah	8	–	7	.533	21	–	12	.636
UCLA	8	–	8	.500	18	–	13	.581
Oregon State	6	–	9	.400	17	–	14	.548
Arizona State	4	–	9	.308	12	–	14	.462
USC	5	–	12	.294	12	–	16	.429
California	2	–	10	.167	11	–	13	.458
Washington	2	–	12	.143	7	–	16	.304
† 2022 Pac-12 Tournament winner Rankings from AP poll

2021–22 Patriot League women's basketball standings
	Conf.				Overall
Team	W		L	PCT	W		L	PCT
Holy Cross	14	–	4	.778	20	–	11	.645
American †	13	–	5	.722	23	–	9	.719
Boston University	12	–	6	.667	17	–	14	.548
Bucknell	12	–	6	.667	24	–	10	.706
Lehigh	11	–	7	.611	19	–	11	.633
Army	10	–	8	.556	16	–	13	.552
Lafayette	7	–	11	.389	12	–	18	.400
Navy	5	–	13	.278	10	–	21	.323
Colgate	4	–	14	.222	6	–	24	.200
Loyola (MD)	2	–	16	.111	5	–	24	.172
† 2022 Patriot League tournament winner

2021–22 SEC women's basketball standings
	Conf.				Overall
Team	W		L	PCT	W		L	PCT
No. 1 South Carolina	15	–	1	.938	35	–	2	.946
No. 9 LSU	13	–	3	.813	26	–	6	.813
No. 18 Tennessee	11	–	5	.688	25	–	9	.735
Ole Miss	10	–	6	.625	23	–	9	.719
Florida	10	–	6	.625	21	–	11	.656
Georgia	9	–	7	.563	21	–	10	.677
No. 15 Kentucky †	8	–	8	.500	19	–	12	.613
Missouri	7	–	9	.438	18	–	13	.581
Arkansas	7	–	9	.438	18	–	14	.563
Alabama	6	–	10	.375	20	–	14	.588
Mississippi State	6	–	10	.375	15	–	14	.517
Texas A&M	4	–	12	.250	14	–	15	.483
Vanderbilt	4	–	12	.250	16	–	19	.457
Auburn	2	–	14	.125	10	–	18	.357
† 2022 SEC tournament winner Rankings from AP poll

2021–22 SWAC women's basketball standings
	Conf.				Overall
Team	W		L	PCT	W		L	PCT
Jackson State †	18	–	0	1.000	23	–	7	.767
Alabama A&M	13	–	5	.722	15	–	14	.517
Alabama State	12	–	6	.667	15	–	15	.500
Southern	11	–	7	.611	14	–	17	.452
Texas Southern	11	–	7	.611	11	–	15	.423
Prairie View A&M	10	–	8	.556	13	–	17	.433
Grambling State	10	–	8	.556	14	–	17	.452
Arkansas–Pine Bluff	9	–	9	.500	13	–	16	.448
Bethune–Cookman	5	–	13	.278	6	–	21	.222
Florida A&M	4	–	14	.222	3	–	25	.107
Mississippi Valley State	3	–	15	.167	4	–	22	.154
Alcorn State	2	–	16	.111	3	–	22	.120
† 2022 SWAC tournament winner

2021–22 Southern Conference women's basketball standings
	Conf.				Overall
Team	W		L	PCT	W		L	PCT
Mercer †	13	–	1	.929	23	–	7	.767
Wofford	11	–	3	.786	17	–	14	.548
Furman	10	–	4	.714	20	–	14	.588
Samford	7	–	7	.500	13	–	17	.433
UNC Greensboro	5	–	9	.357	9	–	19	.321
Chattanooga	5	–	9	.357	7	–	23	.233
East Tennessee State	5	–	9	.357	6	–	22	.214
Western Carolina	0	–	14	.000	7	–	23	.233
† 2022 SoCon Tournament winner

2021–22 Southland Conference women's basketball standings
	Conf.				Overall
Team	W		L	PCT	W		L	PCT
Houston Baptist	12	–	2	.857	16	–	11	.593
Texas A&M–Corpus Christi	11	–	3	.786	19	–	10	.655
Southeastern Louisiana	10	–	4	.714	16	–	11	.593
McNeese State	8	–	6	.571	13	–	15	.464
Incarnate Word †	5	–	9	.357	13	–	17	.433
Northwestern State	5	–	9	.357	12	–	14	.462
New Orleans	3	–	11	.214	5	–	18	.217
Nicholls	2	–	12	.143	4	–	22	.154
† 2022 Southland tournament winner

2021–22 Summit League women's basketball standings
	Conf.				Overall
Team	W		L	PCT	W		L	PCT
South Dakota State	17	–	1	.944	29	–	9	.763
South Dakota †	17	–	1	.944	29	–	6	.829
Kansas City	12	–	6	.667	23	–	9	.719
Oral Roberts	10	–	8	.556	16	–	15	.516
North Dakota	9	–	9	.500	15	–	15	.500
North Dakota State	7	–	11	.389	11	–	18	.379
Western Illinois	5	–	12	.294	14	–	15	.483
Denver	5	–	13	.278	10	–	20	.333
St. Thomas*	4	–	14	.222	7	–	21	.250
Omaha	3	–	14	.176	7	–	19	.269
† 2022 Summit League tournament winner * Ineligible for the 2022 NCAA tournament due to transition from Division III

2021–22 Sun Belt Conference women's basketball standings
	Conf.				Overall
Team	W		L	PCT	W		L	PCT
Troy	13	–	2	.867	24	–	9	.727
UT Arlington †	11	–	4	.733	20	–	8	.714
Louisiana	9	–	4	.692	18	–	7	.720
Appalachian State	8	–	4	.667	14	–	12	.538
Little Rock	8	–	4	.667	17	–	10	.630
Texas State	9	–	6	.600	15	–	14	.517
Georgia Southern	8	–	6	.571	18	–	10	.643
Arkansas State	5	–	9	.357	12	–	16	.429
Coastal Carolina	4	–	9	.308	15	–	11	.577
Georgia State	4	–	9	.308	10	–	16	.385
South Alabama	2	–	10	.167	8	–	18	.308
Louisiana–Monroe	0	–	14	.000	4	–	25	.138
† 2022 Sun Belt tournament winner

2021–22 WAC women's basketball standings
	Conf.				Overall
Team	W		L	PCT	W		L	PCT
Stephen F. Austin †	17	–	1	.944	28	–	5	.848
Grand Canyon	14	–	4	.778	22	–	10	.688
California Baptist*	13	–	5	.722	23	–	9	.719
Utah Valley	10	–	8	.556	16	–	15	.516
Abilene Christian	9	–	9	.500	17	–	13	.567
Sam Houston State	9	–	9	.500	15	–	16	.484
Tarleton State*	8	–	10	.444	16	–	13	.552
Lamar	8	–	10	.444	14	–	15	.483
Texas–Rio Grande Valley	8	–	10	.444	14	–	19	.424
Seattle	6	–	12	.333	11	–	19	.367
Dixie State*	6	–	12	.333	10	–	19	.345
New Mexico State	6	–	12	.333	10	–	19	.345
Chicago State	3	–	15	.167	4	–	23	.148
† 2022 WAC tournament winner * ineligible for the 2022 NCAA tournament due to transition from Division II

2021–22 West Coast Conference women's basketball standings
	Conf.				Overall
Team	W		L	PCT	W		L	PCT
No. 20 BYU	15	–	1	.938	26	–	4	.867
Gonzaga †	15	–	2	.882	27	–	7	.794
San Francisco	10	–	8	.556	17	–	16	.515
Portland	8	–	7	.533	20	–	11	.645
Saint Mary's	9	–	9	.500	18	–	15	.545
San Diego	8	–	9	.471	17	–	15	.531
Santa Clara	8	–	10	.444	16	–	15	.516
Pepperdine	4	–	11	.267	8	–	17	.320
Loyola Marymount	4	–	13	.235	11	–	19	.367
Pacific	3	–	14	.176	6	–	23	.207
† 2022 WCC tournament winner Rankings from AP poll

== Award winners ==
=== All-America teams ===
The NCAA has never recognized a consensus All-America team in women's basketball. This differs from the practice in men's basketball, in which the NCAA uses a combination of selections by the Associated Press (AP), the National Association of Basketball Coaches (NABC), the Sporting News, and the United States Basketball Writers Association (USBWA) to determine a consensus All-America team. The selection of a consensus team is possible because all four organizations select at least a first and second team, with only the USBWA not selecting a third team.

Before the 2017–18 season, it was impossible for a consensus women's All-America team to be determined because the AP had been the only body that divided its women's selections into separate teams. The USBWA first named separate teams in 2017–18. The women's counterpart to the NABC, the Women's Basketball Coaches Association (WBCA), continues the USBWA's former practice of selecting a single 10-member (plus ties) team. The NCAA does not recognize Sporting News as an All-America selector in women's basketball.

=== Major player of the year awards ===
- Wooden Award: Aliyah Boston, South Carolina
- Naismith Award: Aliyah Boston, South Carolina
- Associated Press Player of the Year: Aliyah Boston, South Carolina
- Wade Trophy: Aliyah Boston, South Carolina
- Ann Meyers Drysdale Women's Player of the Year (USBWA): Aliyah Boston, South Carolina
- ESPN.com National Player of the Year:

=== Major freshman of the year awards ===
- Tamika Catchings Award (USBWA): Aneesah Morrow, DePaul
- WBCA Freshman of the Year: Aneesah Morrow, DePaul
- ESPN.com Freshman of the Year:

=== Major coach of the year awards ===
- Associated Press Coach of the Year: Kim Mulkey, LSU
- Naismith College Coach of the Year: Dawn Staley, South Carolina
- USBWA National Coach of the Year: Dawn Staley, South Carolina
- WBCA National Coach of the Year: Dawn Staley, South Carolina
- ESPN.com Coach of the Year:
- WBCA Assistant Coach of the Year: Kate Paye, Stanford

=== Other major awards ===
- Naismith Starting Five:
  - Nancy Lieberman Award (top point guard): Caitlin Clark, Iowa
  - Ann Meyers Drysdale Award (top shooting guard): Christyn Williams, UConn
  - Cheryl Miller Award (top small forward): Ashley Joens, Iowa State
  - Katrina McClain Award (top power forward): NaLyssa Smith, Baylor
  - Lisa Leslie Award (top center): Aliyah Boston, South Carolina
- WBCA Defensive Player of the Year: Veronica Burton, Northwestern
- Naismith Women's Defensive Player of the Year: Aliyah Boston, South Carolina
- Becky Hammon Mid-Major Player of the Year Award: Kierstan Bell, Florida Gulf Coast
- Senior CLASS Award (top senior on and off the court): Lexie Hull, Stanford
- Maggie Dixon Award (top rookie head coach): Kelly Rae Finley, Florida
- Academic All-American of the Year (top scholar-athlete): Aliyah Boston, South Carolina
- Elite 90 Award (top GPA among upperclass players at Final Four): Lexie Hull, Stanford
- Pat Summitt Most Courageous Award: Kendall Currence, Northeastern

== Coaching changes ==
Team	Former coach	Interim coach	New coach	Reason
American	Megan Gebbia		Tiffany Coll	Gebbia left American on May 26, 2022, after 9 seasons for the Wake Forest head coaching job. Longtime Eagles associate head coach Coll was promoted to the head coaching position on June 7.
Arizona State	Charli Turner Thorne		Natasha Adair	Turner Thorne announced on March 3, 2022, that she would retire after her 25th season at Arizona State. Delaware head coach Adair was hired by the Sun Devils on March 27.
Arkansas State	Matt Daniel	Destinee Rogers		Daniel resigned nine games into his third season at Arkansas State on December 13, 2021. The following day, the Red Wolves named associate head coach Rogers the interim head coach for the rest of the season. After the season, the team named Rogers as the permanent replacement.
Bradley	Andrea Gorski		Kate Popovec	Gorski announced her retirement on March 22, 2022, after six seasons at Bradley. Northwestern associate head coach and recruiting coordinator Popovec was hired by the Braves on April 6.
Buffalo	Felisha Legette-Jack		Becky Burke	Legette-Jack left Buffalo on March 26, 2022, after 10 seasons for the head coaching job at her alma mater Syracuse. The Bulls hired USC Upstate head coach Burke as her replacement on April 6.
Butler	Kurt Godlevske		Austin Parkinson	Butler parted ways with Godlevske on March 22, 2022, after seven seasons and a 91–144 record, including a combined 4–44 the last two seasons. The Bulldogs hired IUPUI head coach Parkinson on April 8.
BYU	Jeff Judkins		Amber Whiting	Judkins announced his retirement on April 14, 2022, after 21 seasons at BYU, leaving as the program's winningest head coach with 456 wins. Whiting, a former BYU player who was serving as head coach at Burley High School in Idaho, was hired by the Cougars on May 18.
Cal Poly	Faith Mimnaugh		Shanele Stires	Mimnaugh announced her retirement on March 9, 2022, after 25 seasons at Cal Poly, leaving as the program's winningest head coach with 338 wins. Stires, head coach at D2 Cal State East Bay the past 6 seasons, was hired by the Mustangs on April 14.
Cal State Northridge	Lindsey Foster	Carlene Mitchell		Foster announced her resignation on July 27, 2021, due to family reasons. Mitchell's interim tag was removed on March 16, 2022
Chattanooga	Katie Burrows		Shawn Poppie	Burrows stepped down as head coach of her alma mater on March 9, 2022, after four seasons and a 46–68 overall record. Virginia Tech associate head coach Poppie was hired on March 30.
Chicago State	Tiffany Sardin		Andrea Williams	Sardin resigned from Chicago State on May 8, 2022, after 2 seasons. Andrea Williams, head coach at Division II Fort Valley State, was hired by the Cougars on July 1.
Coastal Carolina	Jaida Williams		Kevin Pederson	Coastal Carolina parted ways with Williams on March 18, 2022, after nine seasons and a 129–127 record. On April 12, the Chanticleers hired Pederson from DII Lander University as their new head coach.
Coppin State	Laura Harper		Jermaine Woods	Harper left Coppin State on April 20, 2022, after 2 seasons for the Towson head coaching position. After a month-long search, the Eagles promoted associate head coach Woods on May 26.
Dayton	Shauna Green		Tamika Williams-Jeter	Green left Dayton on March 21, 2022, after six seasons for the Illinois head coaching job. The Flyers hired Williams from D-III Wittenberg University as their new coach on March 26.
Delaware	Natasha Adair		Sarah Jenkins	Adair left Delaware after five seasons for the Arizona State job on March 27, 2022. Penn State assistant Jenkins, who was an assistant with the Blue Hens from 2017–2021, was hired on April 3.
Detroit Mercy	AnnMarie Gilbert	LaTanya Collins	Kate Achter	Detroit Mercy announced on June 15, 2021, that Gilbert had left the program after an abbreviated debut season that was cut short when the parents of every player on the team sent a letter to the university administration alleging rampant mental and physical abuse by Gilbert. Although UDM initially retained Gilbert after an internal investigation, all 14 players on the 2020–21 roster left the program. Titans assistant Collins was named interim head coach for the 2021–22 season. On April 27, 2022, the school hired former Loyola Chicago head coach Kate Achter as the permanent replacement.
Fairfield	Joe Frager		Carly Thibault-DuDonis	Frager announced on October 19, 2021, that he will retire at the end of the season, his 15th as Fairfield head coach. Minnesota associate head coach Thibault-DuDonis was hired by the Stags on April 11, 2022.
Florida	Cameron Newbauer	Kelly Rae Finley		Newbauer, citing personal reasons, announced his resignation from Florida on July 16, 2021, after four seasons. Assistant coach Finley was initially named interim head coach of the Gators for the 2021–22 season. In late September 2021, Florida's student newspaper, The Independent Florida Alligator, reported accusations by multiple players that Newbauer had a long pattern of verbal abuse, physical intimidation, and racist remarks. On February 27, 2022, Florida removed the interim tag from Finley and officially named her head coach.
Florida State	Sue Semrau		Brooke Wyckoff	Semrau announced her retirement from Florida State on March 21, 2022, after 24 seasons. Under Semrau, the Seminoles won 470 games, had 14 20–win seasons, and made the NCAA tournament 16 times. Associate head coach Wyckoff, who served as the Seminoles' interim head coach when Semrau took a leave of absence during the 2020–21 season, was promoted on March 29.
Fordham	Stephanie Gaitley	Candice Green	Bridgette Mitchell	Gaitley resigned from Fordham on July 1, 2022, after 11 seasons. A week later, assistant coach Green was named interim head coach of the Rams for the 2022–23 season. After the season ended, the school hired Northeastern head coach Mitchell on April 7.
Georgia	Joni Taylor		Katie Abrahamson-Henderson	Taylor left Georgia after seven seasons for the Texas A&M job on March 23, 2022. UCF head coach Katie Abrahamson-Henderson, who played two seasons with the Lady Bulldogs from 1986–88 before transferring to Iowa, was hired on March 26.
Harvard	Kathy Delaney-Smith		Carrie Moore	Delaney-Smith announced on November 5, 2021, that she would retire after the 2021–22 season, her 40th year at Harvard. The Crimson hired Michigan assistant Moore as her replacement on April 5.
Illinois	Nancy Fahey		Shauna Green	Fahey announced her retirement on March 4, 2022, after 36 seasons overall and five seasons at Illinois. The Illini hired Dayton head coach Green on March 21.
IUPUI	Austin Parkinson		Kate Bruce	Parkinson left IUPUI on April 8, 2022, after 12 seasons for the Butler head coaching job. On May 12, the Jaguars hired Kate Bruce, head coach at Division II Walsh University, as their new head coach.
Kansas City	Jacie Hoyt		Dionnah Jackson-Durrett	Hoyt left Kansas City after five seasons for the Oklahoma State job on March 20, 2022. Texas associate head coach Jackson-Durrett was hired by the Roos on March 30.
Lehigh	Sue Troyan		Addie Micir	After 27 seasons leading the Lehigh women's team, Troyan announced on April 27, 2022, that she will transition into a senior leadership role within the Athletics department and will be succeeded by Mountain Hawks associate head coach Micir.
Longwood	Rebecca Tillett		Erika Lang-Montgomery	Tillett left Longwood on April 12, 2022, after 4 seasons for the head coaching job at Saint Louis. Florida assistant coach Lang-Montgomery was hired by the Lancers to replace her on April 28.
Loyola Chicago	Kate Achter		Allison Guth	Loyola announced on March 24, 2022, that Achter's contract would not be renewed, ending her six-year tenure with a 67–110 record. The Ramblers hired Yale head coach Guth on April 8.
Mississippi State	Nikki McCray-Penson	Doug Novak	Sam Purcell	McCray-Penson announced on October 12, 2021, that she was stepping down as head coach after one season at Mississippi State due to health concerns. Assistant Coach Novak, who had been hired by the Bulldogs in August, was named interim head coach for the season. Louisville assistant Purcell was hired as the permanent replacement on March 12, 2022.
Mississippi Valley State	Ashley Walker-Johnson		Kimberly Anderson	Anderson was hired to replace Walker-Johnson on May 3, 2022, following 7 seasons as head coach at D-II Lane College.
Missouri State	Amaka Agugua-Hamilton		Beth Cunningham	Agugua-Hamilton left Missouri State on March 21, 2022, after three seasons to take the head coaching job at Virginia. Duke assistant coach Cunningham was hired by the Lady Bears on March 30.
New Mexico State	Brooke Atkinson		Jody Adams-Birch	New Mexico State announced on March 15, 2022, that Atkinson's contract will not be renewed after five seasons, finishing with a 75–68 record. Southern Illinois assistant coach Adams-Birch, who previously served as head coach at Murray State and Wichita State, was hired by the Aggies on March 31.
Oklahoma State	Jim Littell		Jacie Hoyt	Oklahoma State announced on March 7, 2022, that Littell will not return next season after 10 seasons as head coach. Kansas City head coach Hoyt was hired on March 20.
Oral Roberts	Misti Cussen		Kelsi Musick	Oral Roberts parted ways with Cussen on March 30, 2022, after 10 seasons. Musick, head coach at Division II Southwestern Oklahoma State the past 13 seasons, was hired by the Golden Eagles on April 21.
Purdue	Sharon Versyp		Katie Gearlds	Purdue initially announced on March 26, 2021, that the 2021–22 season, which would have been Versyp's 16th season as head coach, would be her last at her alma mater. She will be succeeded by another former Boilermaker star player in Katie Gearlds, who was set to serve as associate head coach this season after spending the past eight seasons as head coach of Marian (IN) of the NAIA. However, Versyp announced her retirement effective immediately on September 16.
Rutgers	C. Vivian Stringer		Coquese Washington	Stringer announced her retirement on April 30, 2022, effective September 1, after 50 years as head coach, the last 27 at Rutgers. Stringer, who did not coach the Scarlet Knights this season because of COVID concerns, leaves as the program's winningest coach with 535 wins and as the 5th all-time winningest coach in women's basketball history, with 1,055. Notre Dame associate head coach and former Penn State head coach Washington was hired on May 23.
Saint Louis	Lisa Stone		Rebecca Tillett	Saint Louis fired Stone on March 18, 2022, after 10 seasons and a 164–138 record. Longwood head coach Tillett was hired by the Billikens on April 12.
Saint Peter's	Marc Mitchell		Jennifer Leedham	In an unusual move, Mitchell left Saint Peter's on June 29, 2022, after 4 seasons for the head coaching job at NCAA D2 UIndy. St. Francis Brooklyn associate head coach Leedham was hired by the Peacocks on July 25.
San Jose State	Jamie Craighead		April Phillips	San Jose State announced on March 11, 2022, that Craighead will not be retained as head coach, ending her nine-year tenure with an 89–160 record. Texas assistant coach Phillips was hired by the Spartans on April 6.
South Carolina State	Audra Smith	Ervin Monier	Timothy Eatman	South Carolina State parted ways with Smith on February 24, 2022, after three seasons, a day after she filed a Title IX lawsuit against the school. Bulldogs associate head coach Monier was named interim head coach for the rest of the season. On July 12, Rutgers assistant Eatman was hired as the new head coach.
South Dakota	Dawn Plitzuweit		Kayla Karius	Plitzuweit left South Dakota on March 31, 2022, after 6 seasons for the West Virginia coaching job. Drake assistant coach Karius, who was an assistant for the Coyotes from 2016–18, was hired on April 10.
Southern Illinois	Cindy Stein		Kelly Bond-White	Stein announced her retirement on July 2, 2021, effective at the end of the season, her ninth at SIU. Texas A&M associate head coach Bond-White was hired by the Salukis on March 31.
Syracuse	Quentin Hillsman	Vonn Read	Felisha Legette-Jack	Hillsman resigned from Syracuse on August 2, 2021, after 15 seasons amid allegations of inappropriate behavior by former players. Two days later, associate head coach Read was named interim head coach of the Orange for the 2021–22 season. Following the season, Buffalo head coach and former Syracuse star Felisha Legette-Jack was hired on March 26.
Temple	Tonya Cardoza		Diane Richardson	Temple announced on March 22, 2022, that Cardoza will not return as head coach, ending her 14-year tenure with a 251–188 record. Towson head coach Richardson was hired by the Owls in April 5.
Texas A&M	Gary Blair		Joni Taylor	Blair announced on October 28, 2021, that he will retire at the end of the 2021–22 season, his 19th as head coach at A&M. Blair's accolades with the Aggies include being the winningest head coach of the program with 444 wins, two SEC tournament Titles, a National championship, and becoming the third women's college basketball coach to have the court at their home arena named for them. Georgia head coach Taylor was hired on March 23, 2022.
Texas Southern	Cynthia Cooper-Dyke		Vernette Skeete	Cooper-Dyke, serving her second stint as Texas Southern head coach, announced her retirement on March 17, 2022, after three seasons at the school. Texas A&M co-associate head coach Skeete was hired by the Lady Tigers on April 13.
Towson	Diane Richardson		Laura Harper	Richardson left Towson on April 5, 2022, after 5 seasons for the Temple head coaching position. The Tigers hired Coppin State head coach Harper on April 20.
UCF	Katie Abrahamson-Henderson		Sytia Messer	Abrahamson-Henderson left UCF on March 26, 2022, after six seasons for the Georgia head coaching vacancy. LSU associate head coach Messer was hired by the Knights on April 3.
UIC	Tasha Pointer		Ashleen Bracey	UIC announced on March 5, 2022, that Pointer will not return as head coach, ending her four-year tenure with an 11–94 overall record. Missouri assistant coach Bracey was hired by the Flames on March 28.
UNC Wilmington	Karen Barefoot	Tina Martin	Nicole Woods	UNC Wilmington fired Barefoot on February 14, 2022, after four-and-a-half seasons, with the Seahawks at 50–83 overall and winless in conference play this season at the time of the announcement. Assistant coach Martin was initially named interim head coach for the rest of the season. On April 8, the school announced that Martin will continue to serve as the interim head coach of the team for the 2022-23 season. After Martin was not retained, Charlotte associate head coach Woods was hired on April 13, 2023.
USC Upstate	Becky Burke		Jason Williams	Burke left USC Upstate on April 6, 2022, after 2 seasons for the Buffalo head coaching job. On April 22, Jason Williams was hired by the Spartans after 9 seasons as head coach at D-II Belmont Abbey.
Virginia	Tina Thompson		Amaka Agugua-Hamilton	Thompson was fired by Virginia on March 3, 2022, after four seasons and a 30–63 record. Missouri State head coach Amaka Agugua-Hamilton was hired by the Cavaliers on March 21.
Wake Forest	Jennifer Hoover		Megan Gebbia	Wake Forest fired Hoover on May 11, 2022, after 10 seasons and a 142–170 overall record. American head coach Gebbia was hired by the Demon Deacons on May 26.
West Virginia	Mike Carey		Dawn Plitzuweit	Carey announced his retirement on March 16, 2022. He retired after 21 seasons at West Virginia as their winningest coach with a record of 447–239. The Mountaineers hired South Dakota head coach Plitzuweit as his replacement on March 31.
William & Mary	Ed Swanson		Erin Dickerson	William & Mary announced on March 21, 2022, that Swenson will not be retained for next season, ending his nine-year tenure with a 126–128 record. Wake Forest associate head coach Dickerson was hired by the Tribe on April 11.
Wyoming	Gerald Mattinson		Heather Ezell	Mattinson announced his retirement on March 25, 2022, after three seasons at Wyoming and was succeeded by Cowgirls associate head coach Ezell.
Yale	Allison Guth		Dalila Eshe	Guth left Yale on April 8, 2022, after 7 seasons for the head coach opening at Loyola Chicago. Princeton assistant coach Eshe was hired by the Bulldogs on April 25.

== See also ==
- 2021–22 NCAA Division I men's basketball season
