= 2022 Horizon League women's basketball tournament =

- Classification: Division I
- Season: 2021–22
- Teams: 12
- Site: Campus sites (first round and quarterfinals); Indiana Farmers Coliseum; Indianapolis, Indiana (semifinals round and finals)
- First round site: 12
- Champions: IUPUI (2nd title)
- Winning coach: Austin Parkinson (2nd title)
- MVP: Macee Williams (IUPUI)
- Television: ESPN+, ESPNU

The 2022 Horizon League women's basketball tournament is the final event of the 2021–22 women's basketball season for the Horizon League. It began on March 1, 2022, and will end on March 8; first-round and quarterfinal games are played at the home courts of the higher seeds, with all remaining games at Indiana Farmers Coliseum in Indianapolis. The winner will receive the conference's automatic berth into the NCAA tournament.

2021–22 Horizon League women's basketball standings
| | Conf. | | | | Overall |
| Team | W | | L | PCT | W | | L | PCT |
|---|---|---|---|---|---|---|---|---|
| IUPUI † | 18 | – | 4 | .818 | 24 | – | 5 | .828 |
| Youngstown State | 18 | – | 4 | .818 | 23 | – | 7 | .767 |
| Green Bay | 15 | – | 4 | .789 | 19 | – | 8 | .704 |
| Cleveland State | 14 | – | 6 | .700 | 21 | – | 9 | .700 |
| Northern Kentucky | 14 | – | 6 | .700 | 21 | – | 8 | .724 |
| Milwaukee | 13 | – | 9 | .591 | 14 | – | 16 | .467 |
| Oakland | 11 | – | 9 | .550 | 15 | – | 15 | .500 |
| Robert Morris | 11 | – | 11 | .500 | 13 | – | 15 | .464 |
| Purdue Fort Wayne | 7 | – | 14 | .333 | 7 | – | 21 | .250 |
| Wright State | 3 | – | 18 | .143 | 4 | – | 19 | .174 |
| UIC | 1 | – | 20 | .048 | 2 | – | 25 | .074 |
| Detroit Mercy | 1 | – | 21 | .045 | 1 | – | 27 | .036 |
† 2022 Horizon League Tournament winner

== Seeds ==
All conference members are participating in the tournament, with the top four teams in the regular-season conference standings receiving byes to the quarterfinals. Tiebreakers used are 1) Head-to-head results, 2) comparison of records against individual teams in the conference starting with the top-ranked team and working down and 3) NCAA NET rankings on the first available report after the regular season is complete.

| Seed | School | Conf | Tiebreaker |
|---|---|---|---|
| 1 | IUPUI | 18–4 | 2–0 vs. Youngstown State |
| 2 | Youngstown State | 18–4 | 0–2 vs. IUPUI |
| 3 | Green Bay | 15–4 | |
| 4 | Cleveland State | 14–6 | 2–0 vs. Northern Kentucky |
| 5 | Northern Kentucky | 14–6 | 0–2 vs. Cleveland State |
| 6 | Milwaukee | 13–9 | |
| 7 | Oakland | 11–9 | |
| 8 | Robert Morris | 11–11 | |
| 9 | Purdue Fort Wayne | 7–14 | |
| 10 | Wright State | 3–18 | |
| 11 | UIC | 1–20 | |
| 12 | Detroit Mercy | 1–21 | |

== Schedule ==
| Game | Time | Matchup | Score | Television |
First round – March 1
| 1 | 5:30 pm | No. 10 Wright State at No. 7 Oakland | 45–54 | ESPN+ |
| 2 | 7:00 pm | No. 12 Detroit Mercy at No. 5 Northern Kentucky | 50–73 | ESPN+ |
| 3 | 7:00 pm | No. 9 Purdue Fort Wayne at No. 8 Robert Morris | 56–70 | ESPN+ |
| 4 | 8:00 pm | No. 11 UIC at No. 6 Milwaukee | 46–55 | ESPN+ |
Quarterfinals – Thursday, March 3
| 5 | 7:00 pm | No. 8 Robert Morris at No. 1 IUPUI | 42–71 | ESPN+ |
| 6 | 7:00 pm | No. 5 Northern Kentucky at No. 4 Cleveland State | 51–59 | ESPN+ |
| 7 | 7:00 pm | No. 7 Oakland at No. 2 Youngstown State | 63–52 | ESPN+ |
| 8 | 7:00 pm | No. 6 Milwaukee at No. 3 Green Bay | 51–59 | ESPN+ |
Semifinals – Monday, March 7 at Indiana Farmers Coliseum, Indianapolis, IN
| 9 | 7:00 pm | No. 1 IUPUI vs. No. 7 Oakland | 86–63 | ESPN+ |
| 10 | 9:30 pm | No. 3 Green Bay vs. No. 4 Cleveland State | 42–69 | ESPN+ |
Championship – Tuesday, March 8 at Indiana Farmers Coliseum, Indianapolis, IN
| 11 | Noon | No. 1 IUPUI vs. No. 4 Cleveland State | 61–54 | ESPNU |
All game times Eastern. Rankings denote tournament seed

== Bracket ==
First round Tuesday, March 1
5 | Northern Kentucky | 73
12 | Detroit Mercy | 50
6 | Milwaukee | 55
11 | UIC | 46
7 | Oakland | 54
10 | Wright State | 45
8 | Robert Morris | 70
9 | Purdue Fort Wayne | 56

Quarterfinals; Thursday, March 3
1 | IUPUI | 71
8 | Robert Morris | 42
4 | Cleveland State | 59
5 | Northern Kentucky | 51
3 | Green Bay | 57
6 | Milwaukee | 42
2 | Youngstown State | 52
7 | Oakland | 63

Semifinals; Monday, March 7
1 | IUPUI | 86
7 | Oakland | 63
3 | Green Bay | 42
4 | Cleveland State | 69

Championship; Tuesday, March 8
1 | IUPUI | 61
4 | Cleveland State | 54
