= Austin Parkinson =

American basketball coach and former player (born 1981)

Biographical details
- Born: August 8, 1981 (age 44); Kokomo, Indiana, U.S.

Playing career
- 2000–2004: Purdue

Coaching career (HC unless noted)
- 2008–2010: IUPUI (men's assistant)
- 2010–2022: IUPUI
- 2022–2026: Butler

Head coaching record
- Overall: 278–214 (.565)
- Tournaments: 0–1 (NCAA Division I)

Austin Parkinson (born August 8, 1981) is an American college basketball coach who recently was the head coach of the Butler Bulldogs women's basketball program. He held the same position at Indiana University Indianapolis from 2010 to 2022.

== Playing career ==
Parkinson played four seasons of college basketball for Purdue University. He graduated in 2004 with the tenth-most assists in school history.

== Coaching career ==
=== IUPUI (2008–2022) ===
==== Assistant, men's team ====
Parkinson's collegiate coaching career began in 2008 when he was hired as an assistant coach for the men's basketball team at Indiana University Purdue–University Indianapolis (IUPUI), now known as Indiana University Indianapolis.

==== Head coach of women's team ====
Following the conclusion of the 2009-10 season, Parkinson was hired as the head coach for the IUPUI women's basketball program. The previous coach, Shann Hart had been fired following allegations of player abuse. Hart's scandal-tinged firing left the program in a state of duress, but Parkinson led the Jaguars to eight 20-win seasons during his tenure, as well as the school's first-ever berth in the NCAA Division I women's basketball tournament. Commentators described the success of the program under his leadership as "nothing short of miraculous."

=== Butler (2022–2026) ===
On April 8, 2022, Parkinson was announced as the next head coach of the women's basketball team at Butler University. After four seasons in which the team failed to finish above .500, Butler and Parkinson mutually agreed to part ways in April 2026.

== Personal life ==
Parkinson's father, Bruce Parkinson, also played basketball at Purdue and held the school's record for career assists until the 2024–25 season. Bruce was elected to the Indiana Basketball Hall of Fame in 2004.

Parkinson's Grandfather, Jack Parkinson, won the 1946 NIT and 1948 NCAA tournament playing for Adolph Rupp at the University of Kentucky. He is a member of the Indiana Basketball Hall of Fame and the Kentucky Basketball Hall of Fame.

== Head coaching record ==
Record table
Season	Team	Overall	Conference	Standing	Postseason
IUPUI Jaguars (Summit League) (2010–2017)
2010–11	IUPUI	4–24	2–16	9th	
2011–12	IUPUI	13–19	7–11	6th	
2012–13	IUPUI	20–12	12–4	2nd	
2013–14	IUPUI	23–10	11–3	2nd	
2014–15	IUPUI	15–16	9–7	3rd	
2015–16	IUPUI	21–11	11–5	3rd	
2016–17	IUPUI	24–9	12–4	2nd	
IUPUI Jaguars (Horizon League) (2017–2022)
2017–18	IUPUI	22–10	13–5	2nd	
2018–19	IUPUI	20–12	13–5	3rd	
2019–20	IUPUI	23–8	15–3	1st	
2020–21	IUPUI	15–5	11–3	1st	
2021–22	IUPUI	24–7	18–4	1st	NCAA Division I Round of 64
IUPUI:		224–141 (.614)	134–70 (.657)		
Butler Bulldogs (Big East Conference) (2022–2026)
2022–23	Butler	11–19	6–14	8th	
2023–24	Butler	15–17	6–12	8th	
2024–25	Butler	16–18	5–13	8th	
2025–26	Butler	12–19	6–14	9th	
Butler:		54–73 (.425)	23–53 (.303)		
Total:		278–214 (.565)			
National champion Postseason invitational champion Conference regular season champion Conference regular season and conference tournament champion Division regular season champion Division regular season and conference tournament champion Conference tournament champion
