= 2021–22 Belmont Bruins women's basketball team =

Sports team season

2021–22 Belmont Bruins women's basketball

OVC Regular Season and Tournament Champions

NCAA Women's Tournament, second round
- Conference: Ohio Valley Conference
- Record: 23–8 (16–2 OVC)
- Head coach: Bart Brooks (5th season)
- Associate head coach: Jamey Givens
- Assistant coaches: Amy Malo; Jessica Holman
- Home arena: Curb Event Center

2021–22 Ohio Valley Conference women's basketball standings
	Conf.				Overall
Team	W		L	PCT	W		L	PCT
Belmont †	16	–	2	.889	23	–	8	.742
Tennessee Tech	14	–	4	.778	21	–	11	.656
Murray State	13	–	5	.722	22	–	10	.688
Austin Peay	11	–	7	.611	20	–	13	.606
Eastern Illinois	11	–	7	.611	16	–	14	.533
UT Martin	9	–	9	.500	12	–	18	.400
SIU Edwardsville	8	–	10	.444	13	–	18	.419
Tennessee State	6	–	12	.333	12	–	19	.387
Southeast Missouri State	2	–	16	.111	6	–	23	.207
Morehead State	0	–	18	.000	1	–	27	.036
† 2022 OVC tournament winner

The 2021–22 Belmont Bruins women's basketball team represented Belmont University during the 2021–22 NCAA Division I women's basketball season. The Bruins, led by second-year head coach Bart Brooks, played their home games at the Curb Event Center as members of the Ohio Valley Conference (OVC). They finished the season 23–8, 16–2 in OVC play to win the OVC regular season. They won the OVC women's tournament by defeating Tennessee Tech, and earned an automatic trip to the NCAA women's tournament, where they upset Oregon in the first round before losing to Tennessee in the second round.

== Roster ==
2021–22 Belmont Bruins women's basketball team
Players
Coaches

Pos.	#	Name	Height	Year	Previous school	Hometown
G	0	Tuti Jones	5 ft 7 in (1.7 m)	So	Charles Henderson	Troy, AL
F	3	Madison Bartley	6 ft 3 in (1.91 m)	So	Kettering Fairmont	Kettering, OH
G	4	Macie Culbertson	5 ft 11 in (1.8 m)	Sr	Daniel Boone	Fall Branch, TN
F	10	Allison Luly	6 ft 1 in (1.85 m)	RS Sr	Creekview	Alpharetta, GA
G	11	Destinee Wells	5 ft 6 in (1.68 m)	So	Houston	Lakeland, TN
G	12	Kilyn McGuff	6 ft 0 in (1.83 m)	Fr	Bishop Watterson	Columbus, OH
G	14	Jamilyn Kinney	5 ft 7 in (1.7 m)	Sr	Van Buren	Van Buren, AR
F	20	Conley Chinn	6 ft 1 in (1.85 m)	RS Sr	Jackson Academy	Jackson, MS
G	21	Blair Sch	5 ft 8 in (1.73 m)	So	Brentwood Academy	Brentwood, TN
F	22	Tessa Miller	6 ft 2 in (1.88 m)	Fr	Stone Memorial	Crossville, TN
G	23	Nikki Baird	6 ft 0 in (1.83 m)	Jr	Wheaton North	Wheaton, IL
G	24	Kiki Britzmann	6 ft 0 in (1.83 m)	Jr	Incarnate Word Academy	St. Louis, MO

Head coach

- Bart Brooks (Wyoming)

Assistant coach(es)

- Jamey Givens (Florida State)
- Amy Malo (Vanderbilt)
- Jessica Holman (Vanderbilt)

Legend

- (C) Team captain
- (S) Suspended
- (I) Ineligible
- (W) Walk-on
- Injured
- Current redshirt

Roster

== Schedule and results ==
Date time, TV	Rank^{#}	Opponent^{#}	Result	Record	Site (attendance) city, state
Non–conference regular season
November 9, 2021*; 6:00 pm, ESPN+		at Chattanooga	W 88–70	1–0	McKenzie Arena (1,041); Chattanooga, TN
November 11, 2021*; 7:00 pm, SECN+		at Ole Miss	W 62–50	2–0	SJB Pavilion (1,688); Oxford, MS
November 14, 2021*; 1:00 pm, ACCNX		at Georgia Tech	L 45–58	2–1	McCamish Pavilion (1,501); Atlanta, GA
November 18, 2021*; 6:30 pm, ESPN+		Alabama A&M	W 63–34	3–1	Curb Event Center (512); Nashville, TN
November 21, 2021*; 1:00 pm, ESPN+		at UCF	L 45–57	3–2	Addition Financial Arena (2,385); Orlando, FL
November 28, 2021*; 7:00 pm, SECN+		at Arkansas	L 63–83	3–3	Bud Walton Arena (2,834); Fayetteville, AR
December 2, 2021*; 5:00 pm, SECN+		Lipscomb; Battle of the Boulevard	W 67–62	4–3	Curb Events Center (1,783); Nashville, TN
December 5, 2021*; 11:00 am, ACCN		at No. 10 Louisville	L 66–80	4–4	KFC Yum! Center (7,092); Louisville, KY
December 15, 2021*; 7:00 pm, ESPN+		Auburn	W 71–62	5–4	Curb Events Center (2,031); Nashville, TN
December 19, 2021*; 3:00 pm, ESPN+		Middle Tennessee	Cancelled		Curb Events Center; Nashville, TN
December 22, 2021*; 1:00 pm, ESPN+		Western Kentucky	Cancelled		Curb Events Center; Nashville, TN
Ohio Valley Conference regular season
December 30, 2021; 5:30 pm, ESPN+		at SIUE	W 87–49	6–4 (1–0)	Vadalabene Center (193); Edwardsville, IL
January 1, 2022; 1:00 pm, ESPN+		at Eastern Illinois	W 71–57	7–4 (2–0)	Lantz Arena (622); Charleston, IL
January 6, 2022; 5:00 pm, ESPN+		Southeast Missouri	W 85–65	8–4 (3–0)	Curb Events Center (112); Nashville, TN
January 8, 2022; 1:00 pm		at UT Martin	Postponed		Skyhawk Arena; Martin, TN
January 13, 2022; 5:00 pm, ESPN+		Austin Peay	W 65–46	9–4 (4–0)	Curb Events Center (755); Nashville, TN
January 15, 2022; 2:00 pm, ESPN+		Murray State	W 67–52	10–4 (5–0)	Curb Events Center (1,002); Nashville, TN
January 17, 2022; 2:00 pm		at UT Martin	Postponed		Skyhawk Arena; Martin, TN
January 20, 2022; 3:00 pm, ESPN+		at Morehead State	W 103–50	11–4 (6–0)	Ellis Johnson Arena (445); Morehead, KY
January 22, 2022; 2:00 pm		Tennessee Tech	L 55–57	11–5 (6–1)	Curb Events Center (714); Nashville, TN
January 27, 2022; 5:00 pm, ESPN+		at Austin Peay	L 68–70	11–6 (6–2)	Dunn Center (932); Clarksville, TN
January 29, 2022; 4:00 pm		UT Martin	W 73–48	12–6 (7–2)	Curb Events Center (1,040); Nashville, TN
February 3, 2022; 5:30 pm, ESPN+		at Tennessee State	W 85–46	13–6 (8–2)	Gentry Complex (375); Nashville, TN
February 5, 2022; 5:30 pm		at Tennessee Tech	W 58–49	14–6 (9–2)	Eblen Center (2,880); Cookeville, TN
February 7, 2022; 6:00 pm		at UT Martin; Rescheduled from January 17	W 45–39	15–6 (10–2)	Skyhawk Arena (602); Martin, TN
February 10, 2022; 5:00 pm, ESPN+		Morehead State	W 76–51	16–6 (11–2)	Curb Events Center (825); Nashville, TN
February 12, 2022; 2:00 pm, ESPN+		at Southeast Missouri	W 70–67	17–6 (12–2)	Show Me Center (410); Cape Girardeau, MO
February 17, 2022; 5:00 pm, ESPN+		Eastern Illinois	W 77–46	18–6 (13–2)	Curb Events Center (1,216); Nashville, TN
February 19, 2022; 2:00 pm, ESPN+		SIUE	W 88–50	19–6 (14–2)	Curb Events Center (1,136); Nashville, TN
February 24, 2022; 5:00 pm, ESPN+		at Murray State	W 85–79	20–6 (15–2)	CFSB Center (1,891); Murray, KY
February 26, 2022; 3:00 pm, ESPN+		Tennessee State	W 82–44	21–6 (16–2)	Curb Events Center (1,553); Nashville, TN
Ohio Valley Conference tournament
March 4, 2022; 1:00 pm, ESPN+	(1)	vs. (4) Austin Peay; Semifinals	W 63–51	21–7	Ford Center; Evansville, IN
March 5, 2022; 2:00 pm, ESPN+	(1)	vs. (2) Tennessee Tech; Championship	W 51–29	22–7	Ford Center (522); Evansville, IN
NCAA Women's Tournament
March 19, 2022*; 4:30 pm, ESPN2	(12 W)	vs. (5 W) Oregon; First Round	W 73–70 ^{2OT}	23–7	Thompson–Boling Arena (5,448); Knoxville, TN
March 21, 2022*; 6:00 pm, ESPN	(12 W)	at (4 W) No. 18 Tennessee; Second Round	L 67–70	23–8	Thompson–Boling Arena (5,484); Knoxville, TN
*Non-conference game. ^{#}Rankings from AP Poll. (#) Tournament seedings in parentheses. W=Wichita. All times are in Central Time.

== Rankings ==
+ Regular season polls	Poll	Pre- season	Week 2	Week 3	Week 4	Week 5	Week 6	Week 7	Week 8	Week 9	Week 10	Week 11	Week 12	Week 13	Week 14	Week 15	Week 16	Week 17	Week 18	Week 19	Final
AP	RV																			N/A	
Coaches	RV	N/A	RV																		

Legend
	Increase in ranking
	Decrease in ranking
	No change
(RV)	Received votes
(NR)	Not ranked

== See also ==
- 2021–22 Belmont Bruins men's basketball team
