= 2022 Ohio Valley Conference women's basketball tournament =

- Classification: Division I
- Season: 2021–22
- Teams: 8
- Site: Ford Center; Evansville, Indiana
- Champions: Belmont (6th title)
- Winning coach: Bart Brooks (4th title)
- MVP: Destinee Wells (Belmont)
- Television: ESPN+, ESPNU, ESPN2

2021–22 Ohio Valley Conference women's basketball standings
	Conf.				Overall
Team	W		L	PCT	W		L	PCT
Belmont †	16	–	2	.889	23	–	8	.742
Tennessee Tech	14	–	4	.778	21	–	11	.656
Murray State	13	–	5	.722	22	–	10	.688
Austin Peay	11	–	7	.611	20	–	13	.606
Eastern Illinois	11	–	7	.611	16	–	14	.533
UT Martin	9	–	9	.500	12	–	18	.400
SIU Edwardsville	8	–	10	.444	13	–	18	.419
Tennessee State	6	–	12	.333	12	–	19	.387
Southeast Missouri State	2	–	16	.111	6	–	23	.207
Morehead State	0	–	18	.000	1	–	27	.036
† 2022 OVC tournament winner

The 2022 Ohio Valley Conference women's basketball tournament was the final event of the 2021–22 NCAA Division I women's basketball season in the Ohio Valley Conference. The tournament was held March 2–5, 2022, at the Ford Center in Evansville, Indiana.

== Seeds ==
Only the top eight teams in the conference qualified for the tournament. Teams were seeded by record within the conference, with a tiebreaker system to seed teams with identical conference records. Tiebreakers used were 1) Head-to-head results and 2) comparison of records against individual teams in the conference starting with the top-ranked team and working down.

Seed	School	Conf.	Tiebreaker
1	Belmont	16–2	
2	Tennessee Tech	14–4	
3	Murray State	13–5	
4	Austin Peay	11–7	1–1 vs. Belmont
5	Eastern Illinois	11–7	0–2 vs. Belmont
6	UT Martin	9–9	
7	SIU Edwardsville	8–10	
8	Tennessee State	6–12	

== Schedule ==
Game	Time	Matchup	Score	Television
First round – Wednesday, March 2
1	1:00 pm	No. 5 Eastern Illinois vs. No. 8 Tennessee State	61–72	ESPN+
2	3:30 pm	No. 6 UT Martin vs. No. 7 SIU Edwardsville	84–86	ESPN+
Quarterfinals – Thursday, March 3
3	1:00 pm	No. 4 Austin Peay vs. No. 8 Tennessee State	67–53	ESPN+
4	3:30 pm	No. 3 Murray State vs. No. 7 SIU Edwardsville	84–76	ESPN+
Semifinals – Friday, March 4
5	1:00 pm	No. 1 Belmont vs. No. 4 Austin Peay	64–51	ESPN+
6	3:30 pm	No. 2 Tennessee Tech vs. No. 3 Murray State	68–62	ESPN+
Championship – Saturday, March 5
7	2:00 pm	No. 1 Belmont vs. No. 2 Tennessee Tech	51-29	ESPN+
All game times in Central Time.

== Bracket ==
First round Wednesday, March 2
5	Eastern Illinois	61
8	Tennessee St.	72
6	UT Martin	84
7	SIU Edwardsville	86

Quarterfinals; Thursday, March 3
4	Austin Peay	67
8	Tennessee St.	53
3	Murray State	84
7	SIU Edwardsville	76

Semifinals; Friday, March 4
1	Belmont	64
4	Austin Peay	51
2	Tennessee Tech	68
3	Murray State	62

Championship; Saturday, March 5
1	Belmont	51
2	Tennessee Tech	29

* denotes number of overtime periods
