= 2021–22 Green Bay Phoenix women's basketball team =

American college basketball season

2021–22 Green Bay Phoenix women's basketball

WNIT, first round
- Conference: Horizon League
- Record: 19–8 (15–4 Horizon)
- Head coach: Kevin Borseth (10th, 19th overall season)
- Assistant coaches: Megan Vogel; Sarah Bronk; Carly Mohns; Patrick Bowlin
- Home arena: Kress Events Center

2021–22 Horizon League women's basketball standings
	Conf.				Overall
Team	W		L	PCT	W		L	PCT
IUPUI †	18	–	4	.818	24	–	5	.828
Youngstown State	18	–	4	.818	23	–	7	.767
Green Bay	15	–	4	.789	19	–	8	.704
Cleveland State	14	–	6	.700	21	–	9	.700
Northern Kentucky	14	–	6	.700	21	–	8	.724
Milwaukee	13	–	9	.591	14	–	16	.467
Oakland	11	–	9	.550	15	–	15	.500
Robert Morris	11	–	11	.500	13	–	15	.464
Purdue Fort Wayne	7	–	14	.333	7	–	21	.250
Wright State	3	–	18	.143	4	–	19	.174
UIC	1	–	20	.048	2	–	25	.074
Detroit Mercy	1	–	21	.045	1	–	27	.036
† 2022 Horizon League Tournament winner

The 2021–22 Green Bay Phoenix women's basketball team represented the University of Wisconsin–Green Bay during the 2021–22 NCAA Division I women's basketball season. The Phoenix, led by Kevin Borseth in his 10th season in his second stint as head coach, and 19th overall, played their home games at the Kress Events Center in Green Bay, Wisconsin as members of the Horizon League.

The Phoenix finished the season at 20–8 and 15–4 in Horizon League play, to finish in third place in the conference standings. As the #3 seed in the Horizon League tournament, they defeated #6 seed Milwaukee in the quarterfinals but were defeated in the semifinals by #4 seed Cleveland State. They received an at-large bid into the WNIT, where they were defeated by Minnesota in the first round.

The leading scorer for the Phoenix was Hailey Oskey, averaging 12.5 points per game, with Maddy Schreiber leading the team in rebounds per game at 4.2, and Meghan Pingel was the team's assist leader at 3.7 per game.

== Previous season ==
The Phoenix finished the 2020–21 season at 15–7 and 14–4 in Horizon League play, to finish in third place in the conference standings. As the #3 seed in the Horizon League tournament, they were defeated by #6 seed Cleveland State in the quarterfinals.

== Roster ==
2021–22 Green Bay Phoenix women's basketball team
Players
Coaches

Pos.	#	Name	Height	Year	Previous school	Hometown
G	0	Hailey Oskey	5 ft 10 in (1.78 m)	RS Jr	Seymour High School	Seymour, WI
G	1	Cassie Schiltz	5 ft 11 in (1.8 m)	RS So	Luxemburg-Casco High School	Luxemburg, WI
G	2	Caelan Givens	5 ft 10 in (1.78 m)	Fr	Chippewa Falls High School	Chippewa Falls, WI
G	3	Ellie Foster	5 ft 10 in (1.78 m)	Fr	Dike–New Hartford High School	Dike, IA
G	12	Callie Genke	6 ft 0 in (1.83 m)	Fr	Freedom High School	Wrightstown, WI
G	14	Meghan Pingel	5 ft 8 in (1.73 m)	RS Sr	Lakeside Lutheran High School	Sun Prairie, WI
F	15	Kendall Renard	6 ft 3 in (1.91 m)	Fr	Green Bay Preble High School	Green Bay, WI
F	21	Jasmine Kondrakiewicz	6 ft 1 in (1.85 m)	Fr	Pius XI Catholic High School	Milwaukee, WI
G	22	Bailey Butler	5 ft 7 in (1.7 m)	Fr	Black Hawk High School	South Wayne, WI
G	24	Sydney Levy	5 ft 8 in (1.73 m)	Jr	Milwaukee	Oshkosh, WI
F/C	30	Jenna Guyer (redshirt)	6 ft 2 in (1.88 m)	Fr	Centennial High School	Circle Pines, MN
G/F	34	Maddy Schreiber	6 ft 0 in (1.83 m)	Fr	Kimberly High School	Appleton, WI
F	35	Julia Hartwig	6 ft 2 in (1.88 m)	RS Fr	Janesville Parker High School	Janesville, WI
F	45	Brooklyn Blackburn	6 ft 0 in (1.83 m)	RS Fr	Wauwatosa East High School	Milwaukee, WI

Head coach

- Kevin Borseth (Lake Superior State)

Assistant coach(es)

- Megan Vogel (South Dakota State)
- Sarah Bronk (St. Thomas (MN))
- Patrick Bowlin (St. John's)
- Carly Mohns (Iowa/Green Bay)

Legend

- (C) Team captain
- (S) Suspended
- (I) Ineligible
- (W) Walk-on
- Injured
- Current redshirt

Roster
Last update: March 25, 2025

== Schedule and results ==
Date time, TV	Rank^{#}	Opponent^{#}	Result	Record	High points	High rebounds	High assists	Site (attendance) city, state
Exhibition
October 27, 2021*; 7:00 p.m.		Wisc–Whitewater	W 63–41	–	–	–	–	Kress Events Center; Green Bay, WI
November 3, 2021*; 7:00 p.m.		Wisc–Platteville	W 83–48	–	–	–	–	Kress Events Center; Green Bay, WI
Regular season
November 9, 2021*; 6:00 p.m., ESPN3+		at South Dakota State	L 49–70	0–1	14 – Pingel	6 – Oskey	3 – Hartwig	Frost Center (1,652); Brookings, SD
November 13, 2021*; 1:00 p.m., ESPN+		North Dakota State	W 71–54	1–1	22 – Pingel	7 – Kondrakiewicz	9 – Pingel	Kress Events Center (1,778); Green Bay, WI
November 18, 2021; 7:00 p.m., ESPN+		Northern Kentucky	L 52–61	1–2 (0–1)	19 – Oskey	9 – Schreiber	8 – Pingel	Kress Events Center (1,622); Green Bay, WI
November 20, 2021; 1:00 p.m., ESPN+		Wright State	W 78–67	2–2 (1–1)	21 – Oskey	5 – Butler	5 – Oskey	Kress Events Center (1,653); Green Bay, WI
November 26, 2021*; 3:00 p.m., FloHoops		vs. Oklahoma State; South Point Thanksgiving Shootout	W 57–54	3–2	14 – Oskey	5 – Pingel	3 – Butler	South Point Arena; Las Vegas, NV
November 27, 2021*; 3:00 p.m., FloHoops		vs. SMU; South Point Thanksgiving Shootout	L 43–53	2–3	10 – Kondrakiewicz	7 – Levy	5 – Butler	South Point Arena; Las Vegas, NV
December 2, 2021; 6:00 p.m., ESPN+		at Robert Morris	W 63–44	4–3 (2–1)	16 – Schiltz	9 – Kondrakiewicz	4 – Pingel	UPMC Events Center (252); Moon Township, PA
December 4, 2021; 12:00 p.m., ESPN+		at Youngstown State	L 54–67	4–4 (2–2)	14 – Butler	8 – Schreiber	6 – Pingel	Beeghly Center (1,022); Youngstown, OH
December 14, 2021*; 2:00 p.m., BTN+		Wisconsin	W 63–53	5–4	14 – Oskey	9 – Schreiber	3 – Oskey	Kohl Center (3,906); Madison, WI
December 16, 2021*; 7:00 p.m.		Chicago State	Canceled					Kress Events Center; Green Bay, WI
December 20, 2021*; 7:00 p.m., ESPN+		Central Michigan	W 71–67	6–4	19 – Oskey	6 – Pingel	4 – Butler	Kress Events Center (1,534); Green Bay, WI
December 30, 2021; 1:00 p.m.		Detroit Mercy	Canceled					Kress Events Center; Green Bay, WI
January 1, 2022; 1:00 p.m.		Oakland	Canceled					Kress Events Center; Green Bay, WI
January 6, 2022; 6:00 p.m., ESPN+		at IUPUI	L 49–51	6–5 (2–3)	13 – Schiltz	7 – Blackburn	5 – Pingel	The Jungle (236); Indianapolis, IN
January 8, 2022; 1:00 p.m., ESPN+		at UIC	W 75–38	7–5 (3–3)	15 – Schiltz	8 – Levy	4 – Schiltz	Credit Union 1 Arena (427); Chicago, IL
January 14, 2022; 7:00 p.m.		Cleveland State	Canceled					Kress Events Center; Green Bay, WI
January 16, 2022; 1:00 p.m.		Purdue Fort Wayne	Canceled					Kress Events Center; Green Bay, WI
January 27, 2022; 5:00 p.m., ESPN+		at Wright State	W 73–51	8–5 (4–3)	24 – Levy	9 – 2 tied	7 – Pingel	Nutter Center (575); Fairborn, OH
January 29, 2022; 5:00 p.m., ESPN+		at Northern Kentucky	W 67–58	9–5 (5–3)	22 – Oskey	5 – Schreiber	4 – Pingel	Truist Arena (790); Highland Heights, KY
February 3, 2022; 7:00 p.m., ESPN+		Youngstown State	W 70–69	10–5 (6–3)	14 – Oskey	6 – Schiltz	6 – Butler	Kress Events Center (1,687); Green Bay, WI
February 5, 2022; 1:00 p.m., ESPN+		Robert Morris	W 57–41	11–5 (7–3)	10 – Levy	6 – 2 tied	6 – Pingel	Kress Events Center (1,987); Green Bay, WI
February 7, 2022; 7:00 p.m., ESPN+		Milwaukee	W 65–56	12–5 (8–3)	14 – Oskey	6 – Schreiber	3 – Schreiber	Kress Events Center (1,748); Green Bay, WI
February 10, 2022; 6:00 p.m., ESPN+		at Oakland	W 61–57	13–5 (9–3)	18 – Oskey	10 – Levy	4 – Butler	Athletics Center O'rena (512); Rochester, MI
February 12, 2022; 1:00 p.m., ESPN+		at Detroit Mercy	W 53–39	14–5 (10–3)	10 – Oskey	6 – Butler	2 – Oskey	Calihan Hall (249); Detroit, MI
February 12, 2022; 7:00 p.m., ESPN+		UIC	W 75–46	15–5 (11–3)	21 – Levy	6 – Schiltz	5 – Pingel	Kress Events Center (427); Green Bay, WI
February 19, 2022; 1:00 p.m., ESPN+		IUPUI	W 71–46	16–5 (12–3)	16 – Oskey	8 – Butler	6 – Schiltz	Kress Events Center (2,202); Green Bay, WI
February 21, 2022; 7:00 p.m., ESPN+		at Milwaukee	L 48–50	16–6 (12–4)	9 – Pingel	6 – Oskey	4 – Pingel	Klotsche Center (754); Milwaukee, WI
February 24, 2022; 6:00 p.m., ESPN+		at Purdue Fort Wayne	W 73–57	17–6 (13–4)	18 – Levy	8 – Kondrakiewicz	5 – Butler	Hilliard Gates Sports Center (206); Fort Wayne, IN
February 26, 2022; 2:00 p.m., ESPN+		at Cleveland State	W 66–64	18–6 (14–4)	26 – Oskey	5 – 3 tied	3 – 2 tied	Wolstein Center (297); Cleveland, OH
Horizon League tournament
March 3, 2022; 7:00 p.m., ESPN+	(3)	(6) Milwaukee; Quarterfinals	W 57–42	19–6	14 – Schiltz	7 – Schiltz	4 – Oskey	Kress Events Center (2,014); Green Bay, WI
March 7, 2024; 1:30 p.m., ESPNU	(3)	vs. (4) Cleveland State; Semifinals	L 42–69	19–7	8 – Levy	5 – Schiltz	4 – Pingel	Indiana Farmers Coliseum; Indianapolis, IN
WNIT
March 17, 2022*; 7:00 p.m., ESPN3		Minnesota; First round	L 65–73	19–8	20 – Levy	7 – Kondrakiewicz	6 – Pingel	Kress Center (928); Green Bay, WI
*Non-conference game. ^{#}Rankings from AP poll. (#) Tournament seedings in parentheses. All times are in Central.
