= 2021–22 IUPUI Jaguars women's basketball team =

American college basketball season

2021–2022 IUPUI Jaguars women's basketball
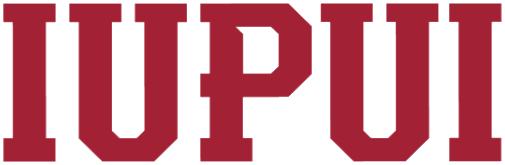

Horizon League Regular Season Co-Champions Horizon League Tournament Champions

NCAA tournament, first round
- Conference: Horizon League
- Record: 24–5 (18–2 Horizon)
- Head coach: Austin Parkinson (12th season)
- Assistant coaches: Latrell Flemming (6th season); Holly Hoopingarner (1st season)
- Home arena: IUPUI Gymnasium

2021–22 Horizon League women's basketball standings
	Conf.				Overall
Team	W		L	PCT	W		L	PCT
IUPUI †	18	–	4	.818	24	–	5	.828
Youngstown State	18	–	4	.818	23	–	7	.767
Green Bay	15	–	4	.789	19	–	8	.704
Cleveland State	14	–	6	.700	21	–	9	.700
Northern Kentucky	14	–	6	.700	21	–	8	.724
Milwaukee	13	–	9	.591	14	–	16	.467
Oakland	11	–	9	.550	15	–	15	.500
Robert Morris	11	–	11	.500	13	–	15	.464
Purdue Fort Wayne	7	–	14	.333	7	–	21	.250
Wright State	3	–	18	.143	4	–	19	.174
UIC	1	–	20	.048	2	–	25	.074
Detroit Mercy	1	–	21	.045	1	–	27	.036
† 2022 Horizon League Tournament winner

The 2021–22 IUPUI Jaguars women's basketball team represented Indiana University–Purdue University Indianapolis in the 2021–22 NCAA Division I women's basketball season. The Jaguars, led by twelfth-year head coach Austin Parkinson, played their home games at the IUPUI Gymnasium in Indianapolis, Indiana as members of the Horizon League.

They finished the season 24–5 overall and 18–2 in Horizon League play, to finish as co-champions of the regular season. As the first seed in the Horizon League Tournament, they earned a bye into the quarterfinals, where they defeated Robert Morris. They defeated Oakland in the semifinals and Cleveland State in the final to win the championship. As a result, the Jaguars received the conference's automatic bid to the NCAA tournament, where they were the thirteenth seed in the Bridgeport Region. This was the first time the team appeared in the NCAA Tournament. They received a bid in 2020, but the tournament was canceled due to the COVID-19 pandemic. They lost in the first round to Oklahoma to end their season.

== Previous season ==
The Jaguars finished the 2020–21 season 15–5, 11–3 in Horizon League play to finish in fifth place. As the fifth seed in the Horizon League Tournament, they received a bye in to the quarterfinals, where they defeated Oakland. They defeated Milwaukee in the semifinals, but fell in the championship to Wright State. They were not invited to the NCAA tournament or the WNIT.

== Roster ==
2021–22 IUPUI Jaguars women's basketball team
Players
Coaches

Pos.	#	Name	Height	Year	Previous school	Hometown
G	0	Trinity Duckworth	5 ft 5 in (1.65 m)	So	Hillcrest	Markham, IL
G	1	Destiny Perkins	5 ft 6 in (1.68 m)	RS Sr	Lawrence North; Akron	Indianapolis, IN
G	2	Taylor Ramey	5 ft 7 in (1.7 m)	Sr	North Central	Indianapolis, IN
G	3	Tyra Ford	5 ft 9 in (1.75 m)	Fr	Anderson	Anderson, IN
F	4	Madison Wise	6 ft 1 in (1.85 m)	GS	Greenfield-Central; Iowa State	Greenfield, IN
G/F	10	Ali Berg	6 ft 1 in (1.85 m)	Jr	Bishop McNamara	Bourbonnais, IL
G	12	Jaci Jones	5 ft 5 in (1.65 m)	So	South Side	Fort Wayne, IN
G	13	Logan Lewis	5 ft 7 in (1.7 m)	Fr	West Bloomfield	West Bloomfield, MI
G/F	14	Rachel McLimore	5 ft 10 in (1.78 m)	RS Sr	Zionsville; DePaul	Zionsville, IN
G	21	Anna Mortag	6 ft 0 in (1.83 m)	So	Brookfield Central	Milwaukee, WI
G/F	22	Rachel Kent	5 ft 11 in (1.8 m)	So	Maine West; Saint Louis Billikens women's basketball	Des Plaines, IL
G	24	Natalie Andersen	6 ft 0 in (1.83 m)	Jr	Mukwonago	Mukwonago, WI
F	30	Morgan Allen	6 ft 2 in (1.88 m)	GS	Hortonville	Greenville, WI
F	32	Nakaiah Hunter	6 ft 0 in (1.83 m)	Fr	North Central	Indianapolis, IN
C	40	Jacquel Bronaugh	6 ft 3 in (1.91 m)	Fr	Wayne	Dayton, OH
F	50	Macee Williams	6 ft 2 in (1.88 m)	GS	Fountain Central	Veedersburg, IN

Head coach

- Austin Parkinson (Purdue)

Assistant coach(es)

- Latrell Fleming (Wisconsin)
- Holly Hoopingarner (IUPUI)

Legend

- (C) Team captain
- (S) Suspended
- (I) Ineligible
- (W) Walk-on
- Injured
- Current redshirt

Roster
Last update: June 15, 2022

== Schedule and results ==
Date time, TV	Rank^{#}	Opponent^{#}	Result	Record	Site (attendance) city, state
Exhibition
November 4, 2021*; 7:00 p.m., ESPN+		IU Northwest	W 98–50	–	IUPUI Gymnasium (372); Indianapolis, IN
Regular season
November 9, 2021*; 7:00 p.m., BTN		at No. 11 Michigan	L 62–72 ^{OT}	0–1	Crisler Center (1,948); Ann Arbor, MI
November 14, 2021*; 2:00 p.m., ESPN3		at Bowling Green	W 71–60	1–1	Stroh Center (1,087); Bowling Green, OH
November 18, 2021; 7:00 p.m., ESPN+		at Cleveland State	L 0–2 (forfeit)	1–2 (0–1)	Wolstein Center; Cleveland, OH
November 20, 2021; 2:00 p.m., ESPN		at Purdue Fort Wayne	L 0–2 (forfeit)	1–3 (0–2)	Hilliard Gates Sports Center; Fort Wayne, IN
November 24, 2021*; 1:00 p.m., ESPN3		at Southern Illinois	Canceled		Banterra Center; Carbondale, IL
November 28, 2021*; 3:00 p.m., ESPN+		Butler	W 80–47	2–3	IUPUI Gymnasium (441); Indianapolis, IN
December 2, 2021; 7:00 p.m., ESPN+		at Detroit Mercy	W 87–52	3–3 (1–2)	Calihan Hall (137); Detroit, MI
December 4, 2021; 2:00 p.m., ESPN+		at Oakland	W 74–49	4–3 (2–2)	Athletics Center O'rena (411); Auburn Hills, MI
December 8, 2021*; 7:00 p.m., ESPN+		Ball State	L 67–73	4–4	IUPUI Gymnasium (510); Indianapolis, IN
December 18, 2021*; 2:00 p.m., ESPN+		Eastern Michigan	Canceled		IUPUI Gymnasium; Indianapolis, IN
December 21, 2021*; 3:00 p.m.		at No. 14 Iowa	W 74–73	5–4	Carver–Hawkeye Arena (4,632); Iowa City, IA
December 31, 2021; 2:00 p.m., ESPN+		Northern Kentucky	L 53–54	5–5 (2–3)	IUPUI Gymnasium (380); Indianapolis, IN
January 2, 2022; 3:00 p.m., ESPN+		Wright State	W 77–62	6–5 (3–3)	IUPUI Gymnasium (312); Indianapolis, IN
January 6, 2022; 7:00 p.m., ESPN+		Green Bay	W 51–49	7–5 (4–3)	IUPUI Gymnasium (236); Indianapolis, IN
January 8, 2022; 2:00 p.m., ESPN+		Milwaukee	W 63–60	8–5 (5–3)	IUPUI Gymnasium (284); Indianapolis, IN
January 14, 2022; 7:00 p.m., ESPN+		at Robert Morris	W 63–44	9–5 (6–3)	UPMC Events Center (288); Moon, PA
January 16, 202; 7:00 p.m., ESPN+		at Youngstown State	W 76–68 ^{OT}	10–5 (7–3)	Beeghly Center (1,303); Youngstown, OH
January 21, 2022; 7:00 p.m., ESPN+		UIC	W 82–44	11–5 (8–3)	IUPUI Gymnasium (430); Indianapolis, IN
January 23, 2022; 2:00 p.m., ESPN+		at UIC	W 68–47	12–5 (9–3)	Credit Union 1 Arena (466); Chicago, IL
January 27, 2022; 7:00 p.m., ESPN+		Purdue Fort Wayne	W 74–55	13–5 (10–3)	IUPUI Gymnasium (553); Indianapolis, IN
January 29, 2022; 2:00 p.m., ESPN+		Cleveland State	W 82–64	14–5 (11–3)	IUPUI Gymnasium (428); Indianapolis, IN
February 4, 2022; 7:00 p.m., ESPN+		Oakland	W 64–56	15–5 (12–3)	IUPUI Gymnasium (303); Indianapolis, IN
February 6, 2022; 3:00 p.m., ESPN+		Detroit Mercy	W 66–49	16–5 (13–3)	IUPUI Gymnasium (412); Indianapolis, IN
February 10, 2022; 6:00 p.m., ESPN+		at Wright State	W 78–53	17–5 (14–3)	Nutter Center (773); Dayton, OH
February 12, 2022; 2:00 p.m., ESPN+		at Northern Kentucky	W 78–53	18–5 (15–3)	BB&T Arena (1,143); Highland Heights, KY
February 17, 2022; 8:00 p.m., ESPN+		at Milwaukee	W 71–59	19–5 (16–3)	Klotsche Center (719); Milwaukee, WI
February 19, 2022; 2:00 p.m., ESPN+		at Green Bay	L 56–71	19–6 (16–4)	Kress Events Center (2,202); Green Bay, WI
February 24, 2022; 6:00 p.m., ESPN+		Youngstown State	W 68–45	20–6 (17–4)	IUPUI Gymnasium (423); Indianapolis, IN
February 26, 2022; 2:00 p.m., ESPN+		Robert Morris	W 73–40	21–6 (18–4)	IUPUI Gymnasium (0); Indianapolis, IN
Horizon League Tournament
March 3, 2022; 7:00 p.m., ESPN+	(1)	(8) Robert Morris; Quarterfinals	W 72–41	22–6	IUPUI Gymnasium (400); Indianapolis, IN
March 7, 2022; Noon, ESPN+	(1)	vs. (7) Oakland; Semifinals	W 86–63	23–6	Indiana Farmers Coliseum (0); Indianapolis, IN
March 8, 2022; Noon, ESPNU	(1)	vs. (4) Cleveland State; Final	W 61–54	24–6	Indiana Farmers Coliseum (0); Indianapolis, IN
NCAA tournament
March 19, 2022; 10:00 p.m., ESPNU	(13 B)	at (4 B) No. 22 Oklahoma; First Round	L 72–78	24–7	Lloyd Noble Center (3,952); Norman, OK
*Non-conference game. ^{#}Rankings from AP Poll. (#) Tournament seedings in parentheses. B=Bridgeport. All times are in Central.

== Rankings ==
Ranking movements Legend: ██ Increase in ranking ██ Decrease in ranking — = Not ranked RV = Received votes
	Week																		
Poll	Pre	1	2	3	4	5	6	7	8	9	10	11	12	13	14	15	16	17	Final
AP	—	—	—	—	—	—	—	—	—	—	—	—	—	—	—	RV	—	—	RV
Coaches	RV	—	—	—	—	—	—	—	—	—	—	—	—	—	—	—	—	—	—

Legend
	Increase in ranking
	Decrease in ranking
	Not ranked previous week
(RV)	Received votes
(NR)	Not ranked and did not receive votes

The Coaches Poll did not release a Week 2 poll, and the AP Poll did not release a poll after the NCAA Tournament.
