= 2021–22 Mercer Bears women's basketball team =

Intercollegiate basketball season

2021–22 Mercer Bears women's basketball

SoCon Regular Season Champions SoCon Tournament Champions

NCAA tournament, first round
- Conference: Southern Conference
- Record: 23-6 (13-1 SoCon)
- Head coach: Susie Gardner (12th season)
- Assistant coaches: Ben Wierzba; David Lowery; Marqu'es Webb
- Home arena: Hawkins Arena

2021–22 Southern Conference women's basketball standings
	Conf.				Overall
Team	W		L	PCT	W		L	PCT
Mercer †	13	–	1	.929	23	–	7	.767
Wofford	11	–	3	.786	17	–	14	.548
Furman	10	–	4	.714	20	–	14	.588
Samford	7	–	7	.500	13	–	17	.433
UNC Greensboro	5	–	9	.357	9	–	19	.321
Chattanooga	5	–	9	.357	7	–	23	.233
East Tennessee State	5	–	9	.357	6	–	22	.214
Western Carolina	0	–	14	.000	7	–	23	.233
† 2022 SoCon Tournament winner

The 2021–22 Mercer Bears women's basketball team represented Mercer University during the 2021–22 NCAA Division I women's basketball season. The Bears, led by twelfth-year head coach Susie Gardner, played their home games at the Hawkins Arena as members of the Southern Conference (SoCon). They finished the season 23–6, 13–1 in the Southern Conference, winning the regular season and tournament championships, and representing SoCon in the 2022 NCAA Division I women's basketball tournament.

== Roster ==
2021–22 Mercer Bears women's basketball team
Players
Coaches

Pos.	#	Name	Height	Year	Previous school	Hometown
G	0	Kinley Fisher	5 ft 7 in (1.7 m)	Fr	Greenwood	Greenwood, AR
G	1	Amoria Neal-Tysor	5 ft 6 in (1.68 m)	Sr	Lee County	Sanford, NC
G	2	Sidneey Boykin	5 ft 9 in (1.75 m)	So	Clarksville	Clarksville, TN
G	4	Endia Banks	5 ft 9 in (1.75 m)	GS	Duluth; Miami (FL)	Duluth, GA
G	5	Erin Haupt	5 ft 6 in (1.68 m)	Fr	Danville	Danville, IL
G	12	Erin Gutierrez	5 ft 9 in (1.75 m)	GS	Nova	Pembroke Pines, FL
G	13	Kassidy Jones	5 ft 10 in (1.78 m)	Fr	Santa Fe Catholic	Lakeland, FL
F	15	Nigeria Harkless	6 ft 2 in (1.88 m)	Fr	Ribault	Jacksonville, FL
F	20	Sierra Votaw	6 ft 2 in (1.88 m)	GS	Harrells Christian	Harrells, NC
G/F	21	Shannon Titus	5 ft 11 in (1.8 m)	GS	Northview	Johns Creek, GA
G	22	Eliza Snyder	5 ft 10 in (1.78 m)	So	Lakeview	Alpharetta, GA
F	23	Ashlee Locke	6 ft 3 in (1.91 m)	Fr	Flowery Branch	Flowery Branch, GA
F	32	Jaron Dougherty	6 ft 0 in (1.83 m)	Fr	Collins Hill	Buford, GA
F	40	Lauren McNamara-Clement	6 ft 2 in (1.88 m)	GS	Leesville Road; Campbell	Raleigh, NC
F	44	Ally Thane	6 ft 2 in (1.88 m)	Sr	Highland	Pocatello ID

Head coach

- Susie Gardner (Georgia)

Assistant coach(es)

- Ben Wierzba (SIU Edwardsville)
- David Lowery (Mississippi State)
- Marqu'es Webb (Vanderbilt)

Legend

- (C) Team captain
- (S) Suspended
- (I) Ineligible
- (W) Walk-on
- Injured
- Current redshirt

Roster

== Schedule ==
Date time, TV	Rank^{#}	Opponent^{#}	Result	Record	Site (attendance) city, state
Non-conference regular season
Nov 9, 2021*; 7:00 pm, ESPN+		Wake Forest	L 55–68	0–1	Hawkins Arena (1,263); Macon, GA
Nov 11, 2021*; 7:00 pm, ESPN+		Appalachian State	W 61–57	1–1	Hawkins Arena (816); Macon, GA
Nov 15, 2021*; 7:00 pm, ESPN+		Troy	W 75–66	2–1	Hawkins Arena (833); Macon, GA
Nov 18, 2021*; 7:00 pm, SECN+		at Georgia	L 52–67	2–2	Stegeman Coliseum (1,831); Athens, GA
Nov 21, 2021*; 2:00 pm, ESPN+		at Gardner–Webb	W 63–50	3–2	Paul Porter Arena (291); Boiling Springs, NC
Nov 24, 2021*; 7:00 pm, SECN+		at Alabama	L 48–55	3–3	Coleman Coliseum (792); Tuscaloosa, AL
Nov 26, 2021*; 12:00 pm		at South Alabama	W 67–53	4–3	Mitchell Center (145); Mobile, AL
Nov 29, 2021*; 7:00 pm, ESPN+		Kennesaw State	W 66–49	5–3	Hawkins Arena (803); Macon, GA
Dec 3, 2021*; 7:00 pm, CUSA.tv		at Middle Tennessee	L 49–59	5–4	Murphy Center (3,227); Murfreesboro, TN
Dec 5, 2021*; 2:00 pm, ESPN+		at Tennessee State	W 71–70 ^{OT}	6–4	Gentry Complex (255); Nashville, TN
Dec 12, 2021*; 2:00 pm, ESPN+		UCF	L 47–61	6–5	Hawkins Arena (972); Macon, GA
Dec 19, 2021*; 2:00 pm, ESPN+		UAB	W 71–62	7–5	Hawkins Arena (872); Macon, GA
Dec 21, 2021*; 5:00 pm		Bethune–Cookman	Cancelled due to COVID-19 protocols		Hawkins Arena; Macon, GA
Dec 28, 2021*; 4:00 pm, ESPN+		UNC Wilmington	Cancelled due to COVID-19 protocols		Hawkins Arena; Macon, GA
Dec 31, 2021*; 12:00 pm, ESPN+		LaGrange	Cancelled due to COVID-19 protocols		Hawkins Arena; Macon, GA
SoCon regular season
Jan 8, 2022; 2:00 pm, ESPN+		Chattanooga	W 69–52	8–5 (1–0)	Hawkins Arena (1,210); Macon, GA
Jan 13, 2022; 7:00 pm, ESPN+		at UNC Greensboro	W 66–60	9–5 (2–0)	Fleming Gymnasium (382); Greensboro, NC
Jan 15, 2022; 5:00 pm, ESPN+		at Western Carolina	W 69–58	10–5 (3–0)	Ramsey Center (384); Cullowhee, NC
Jan 17, 2022; 5:00 pm, ESPN+		East Tennessee State	W 66–54	11–5 (4–0)	Hawkins Arena (521); Macon, GA
Jan 20, 2022; 7:00 pm, ESPN+		Furman	L 66–69	11–6 (4–1)	Hawkins Arena (825); Macon, GA
Jan 22, 2022; 2:30 pm, ESPN+		Wofford	W 67–53	12–6 (5–1)	Hawkins Arena (813); Macon, GA
Jan 29, 2022; 2:30 pm, ESPN+		Samford	W 73–66	13–6 (6–1)	Hawkins Arena (913); Macon, GA
Feb 3, 2022; 7:00 pm, ESPN+		at Chattanooga	W 59–53	14–6 (7–1)	McKenzie Arena (1,134); Chattanooga, TN
Feb 5, 2022; 12:00 pm, ESPN+		at East Tennessee State	W 82–48	15–6 (8–1)	Brooks Gym (547); Johnson City, TN
Feb 10, 2022; 7:00 pm, ESPN+		Western Carolina	W 46–40	16–6 (9–1)	Hawkins Arena (1,100); Macon, GA
Feb 12, 2022; 2:00 pm, ESPN+		UNC Greensboro	W 75–43	17–6 (10–1)	Hawkins Arena (1,287); Macon, GA
Feb 17, 2022; 7:00 pm, ESPN+		at Wofford	W 74–57	18–6 (11–1)	Jerry Richardson Indoor Stadium (453); Spartanburg, SC
Feb 19, 2022; 6:00 pm		at Furman	W 71–64	19–6 (12–1)	Timmons Arena (427); Greenville, SC
Feb 26, 2022; 3:00 pm		at Samford	W 64–55	20–6 (13–1)	Pete Hanna Center (446); Homewood, AL
SoCon Tournament
Mar 3, 2022; 11:00 am, ESPN+	(1)	vs. (8) Western Carolina; Quarterfinals	W 85–46	21–6	Harrah's Cherokee Center; Asheville, NC
Mar 4, 2022; 11:00 am, ESPN+	(1)	vs. (4) Samford; Semifinals	W 65–35	22–6	Harrah's Cherokee Center; Asheville, NC
Mar 6, 2022; 12:00 pm, ESPN+	(1)	vs. (3) Furman; Championship game	W 73–54	23–6	Harrah's Cherokee Center (905); Asheville, NC
NCAA Tournament
Mar 19, 2022*; 1:00 pm, ABC	(15 B)	at (2 B) No. 5 UConn; First Round	L 38–83	23–7	Harry A. Gampel Pavilion (5,073); Storrs, CT
*Non-conference game. ^{#}Rankings from AP Poll. (#) Tournament seedings in parentheses. G=Greensboro Region. All times are in Eastern Time.
