= 2021–22 Atlantic Coast Conference women's basketball season =

- League: NCAA Division I
- Sport: Basketball
- Teams: 15
- TV partner(s): ACC Network, ESPN, Regional Sports Networks

WNBA Draft
- Top draft pick: Emily Engstler, Louisville
- Picked by: Indiana Fever, 4th overall

2021–22 NCAA Division I women's basketball season
- Regular season Champions: NC State
- Runners-up: Louisville
- Season MVP: Elizabeth Kitley, Virginia Tech
- Top scorer: Jewel Spear – 18.3 ppg

ACC Tournament
- Champions: NC State
- Finals MVP: Elissa Cunane – NC State

Atlantic Coast Conference women's basketball seasons
- ← 2020–21 2022–23 →

2021–22 ACC women's basketball standings
	Conf.				Overall
Team	W		L	PCT	W		L	PCT
No. 3 NC State †	17	–	1	.944	32	–	4	.889
No. 4 Louisville	16	–	2	.889	29	–	5	.853
No. 17 North Carolina	13	–	5	.722	25	–	7	.781
No. 21 Notre Dame	13	–	5	.722	24	–	9	.727
No. 16 Virginia Tech	13	–	5	.722	23	–	10	.697
Georgia Tech	11	–	7	.611	21	–	11	.656
Boston College	10	–	8	.556	21	–	12	.636
Miami (FL)	10	–	8	.556	21	–	13	.618
Florida State	10	–	8	.556	17	–	14	.548
Duke	7	–	11	.389	17	–	13	.567
Wake Forest	4	–	14	.222	16	–	17	.485
Syracuse	4	–	14	.222	11	–	18	.379
Clemson	3	–	15	.167	10	–	21	.323
Pittsburgh	2	–	16	.111	11	–	19	.367
Virginia	2	–	16	.111	5	–	22	.185
† 2022 ACC tournament winner Rankings from AP poll

The 2021–22 Atlantic Coast Conference women's basketball season began with practices in October 2021, followed by the start of the 2021–22 NCAA Division I women's basketball season in November. Conference play started in November 2021 and will conclude on February 27, 2022. After the regular season, the 2022 ACC women's basketball tournament was held at the Greensboro Coliseum in Greensboro, NC for the 22nd time in 23 years.

== Head coaches ==
=== Coaching changes ===
- Sue Semrau will return as head coach of Florida State after taking a leave of absence for the 2020–21 season to care for her mother. Interim Head Coach Brooke Wyckoff will return to her role as Associate head coach.
- Syracuse head coach Quentin Hillsman resigned amid investigations into allegations of inappropriate behavior on August 2, 2021. Associate head coach Vonn Read was named the interim head coach for the 2021–2022 season on August 4, 2021.

=== Coaches ===
Team	Head coach	Previous job	Years at school	Record at school	ACC record	ACC titles	NCAA tournaments	NCAA Final Fours	NCAA Championships
Boston College	Joanna Bernabei-McNamee	Albany	4	41–40	16–31	0	0	0	0
Clemson	Amanda Butler	Florida	4	40–50	18–34	0	1	0	0
Duke	Kara Lawson	Boston Celtics (Assistant)	2	3–1	0–1	0	0	0	0
Florida State	Sue Semrau	Wisconsin (Assistant)	24	475–257	207–151	2	15	0	0
Georgia Tech	Nell Fortner	Auburn	3	37–20	22–14	0	1	0	0
Louisville	Jeff Walz	Maryland (Assistant)	15	386–107	175–54	1	6	3	0
Miami	Katie Meier	Charlotte	17	303–198	126–124	1	8	0	0
NC State	Wes Moore	Chattanooga	9	190–64	90–39	2	5	0	0
North Carolina	Courtney Banghart	Princeton	3	29–25	15–20	0	1	0	0
Notre Dame	Niele Ivey	Memphis Grizzlies (Assistant)	2	10–10	8–7	0	0	0	0
Pittsburgh	Lance White	Florida State (Assistant)	4	21–60	6–43	0	0	0	0
Syracuse	Vonn Read (interim)	Syracuse (Assistant)	1	0–0	0–0	0	0	0	0
Virginia	Tina Thompson	Texas (associate head coach)	4	25–41	13–23	0	0	0	0
Virginia Tech	Kenny Brooks	James Madison	6	101–59	35–47	0	1	0	0
Wake Forest	Jennifer Hoover	High Point	10	126–153	45–104	0	1	0	0

Notes:

- Year at school includes 2021–22 season.
- Overall and ACC records are from time at current school and are through the end the 2020–21 season.
- NCAA tournament appearances are from time at current school only.
- NCAA Final Fours and Championship include time at other schools

== Preseason ==
=== Preseason watch lists ===
Below is a table of notable preseason watch lists.

Lieberman	Drysdale	Miller	McClain	Leslie	Naismith	Wooden
Hailey Van Lith – Louisville; Raina Perez – NC State; Diamond Johnson – NC State	Kiara Lewis – Clemson; Celeste Taylor – Duke; Kianna Smith – Louisville; Jakia Brown-Turner – NC State	Taylor Soule – Boston College; Elizabeth Balogun – Duke; Emily Engstler – Louisville; Alyssa Ustby – North Carolina	Lorela Cubaj – Georgia Tech; Olivia Cochran – Louisville; Sam Brunelle – Notre Dame; Kayla Jones – NC State	Elissa Cunane – NC State; Eleah Parker – Virginia; Elizabeth Kitley – Virginia Tech	Lorela Cubaj – Georgia Tech; Hailey Van Lith – Louisville; Elissa Cunane – NC State; Jakia Brown-Turner – NC State; Aisha Sheppard – Virginia Tech; Elizabeth Kitley – Virginia Tech	Jakia Brown-Turner – NC State; Lorela Cubaj – Georgia Tech; Elissa Cunane – NC State; Elizabeth Kitley – Virginia Tech; Lotta-Maj Lathinen – Georgia Tech; Aisha Sheppard – Virginia Tech; Hailey Van Lith – Louisville; Maddy Westbeld – Notre Dame

=== ACC Women's Basketball Tip-off ===
The Preseason Media Poll and Preseason All-ACC teams were voted on after a tipoff event held at the Charlotte Marriott City Center in Charlotte, North Carolina on October 13, 2021. At the media day, the head coaches and the Blue Ribbon Panel voted on the finishing order of the teams, an All-ACC team, a Preseason Player of the Year, and Newcomers to watch. A selected group of student athletes also took questions from the media on this day.

At the media day, both the head coaches and the Blue Ribbon Panel predicted that NC State would be league champion.

==== ACC preseason polls ====
2021 ACC Women's Basketball Preseason Polls
Head coaches	Blue Ribbon Panel
1. NC State – 224 (14); 2. Louisville – 207 (1); 3. Georgia Tech – 192; 4. Virginia Tech – 172; 5. Florida State – 152; 6. Notre Dame – 149; 7. North Carolina – 127; 8. Duke – 125; 9. Miami – 92; 10. Clemson – 83; 11. Boston College – 78; 12. Syracuse – 60; 13. Wake Forest – 59; 14. Pittsburgh – 47; 15. Virginia – 33	1. NC State – 847 (50); 2. Louisville – 789 (7); 3. Georgia Tech – 691; 4. Virginia Tech – 644; 5. Florida State – 607; 6. Notre Dame – 580; 7. North Carolina – 488; 8. Duke – 464; 9. Miami – 355; 10. Clemson – 324; 11. Boston College – 297; 12. Wake Forest – 250; 13. Syracuse – 227; 14. Pittsburgh – 160; 15. Virginia – 117

First place votes shown in parentheses.

==== Preseason All-ACC Teams ====
2021 ACC Women's Basketball Preseason All-ACC Teams
Head coaches	Blue Ribbon Panel
Taylor Soule – Boston College; Delicia Washington – Clemson; Lorela Cubaj – Georgia Tech; Lotta-Maj Lahtinen – Georgia Tech; Hailey Van Lith – Louisville; Jakia Brown-Turner – NC State; Elissa Cunane (13) – NC State; Maddy Westbeld – Notre Dame; Elizabeth Kitley (2) – Virginia Tech; Aisha Sheppard – Virginia Tech	Taylor Soule (1) – Boston College; Delicia Washington – Clemson; Lorela Cubaj (1) – Georgia Tech; Lotta-Maj Lahtinen – Georgia Tech; Hailey Van Lith (1) – Louisville; Jakia Brown-Turner (1) – NC State; Elissa Cunane (42) – NC State; Maddy Westbeld – Notre Dame; Elizabeth Kitley (10) – Virginia Tech; Aisha Sheppard (1) – Virginia Tech

Preseason Player of the Year votes shown in parentheses.

==== Preseason ACC Player of the Year ====
2021 ACC Women's Basketball Preseason Player of the Year
Head coaches	Blue Ribbon Panel
Elissa Cunane – NC State

==== Newcomer Watchlist ====
2021 ACC Women's Basketball Newcomer Watchlists
Head coaches	Blue Ribbon Panel
Celeste Taylor – Duke; Payton Verhulst – Louisville; Diamond Johnson – NC State; Olivia Miles – Notre Dame; Sonia Citron – Notre Dame	Payton Verhulst – Louisville; Teonni Key – North Carolina; Diamond Johnson – NC State; Olivia Miles – Notre Dame; Sonia Citron – Notre Dame

== Regular season ==
=== Records against other conferences ===
2021–22 records against non-conference foes as of (April 1, 2022):

Regular season

Power 7 Conferences	Record
American	2–3
Big East	4–1
Big Ten	13–7
Big 12	2–0
Pac-12	4–4
SEC	4–10
Power 7 Conferences Total	29–25
Other NCAA Division 1 Conferences	Record
America East	4–0
A-10	9–4
ASUN	7–1
Big Sky	0–0
Big South	11–0
Big West	2–0
CAA	7–1
C-USA	3–0
Horizon	3–0
Ivy League	4–1
MAAC	1–0
MAC	3–1
MEAC	4–0
MVC	1–1
Mountain West	1–0
NEC	5–0
OVC	4–0
Patriot League	5–2
SoCon	7–0
Southland	0–0
SWAC	5–0
Summit	1–1
Sun Belt	4–0
WAC	0–0
WCC	1–1
Other Division I Total	92–13
Division II Total	0–0
NCAA Division I Total	121–38

Post Season

Power 7 Conferences	Record
American	1–0
Big East	0–1
Big Ten	1–0
Big 12	2–1
Pac-12	1–0
SEC	1–3
Power 7 Conferences Total	6–5
Other NCAA Division 1 Conferences	Record
America East	2–0
A-10	1–0
ASUN	0–1
Big Sky	0–0
Big South	1–0
Big West	0–0
CAA	0–0
C-USA	0–1
Horizon	0–0
Ivy League	0–1
MAAC	1–0
MAC	1–0
MEAC	0–0
MVC	0–1
Mountain West	0–0
NEC	0–0
OVC	0–0
Patriot League	0–0
SoCon	0–0
Southland	0–0
SWAC	0–0
Summit	0–0
Sun Belt	0–0
WAC	1–0
WCC	1–0
Other Division I Total	8–4
NCAA Division I Total	14–9

=== Record against ranked non-conference opponents ===
This is a list of games against ranked opponents only (rankings from the AP Poll):

Date	Visitor	Home	Site	Significance	Score	Conference record
Nov 9	No. 1 South Carolina	No. 5 NC State	Reynolds Coliseum ● Raleigh, NC	—	L 57–66	0–1
Nov 12	No. 6 Louisville	No. 22 Arizona †	Sanford Pentagon ● Sioux Falls, SD	Mammoth Sports Construction Invitational	L 59–61^{OT}	0–2
Nov 17	Clemson	No. 1 South Carolina	Colonial Life Arena ● Columbia, SC	Rivalry	L 45–76	0–3
Nov 20	Syracuse	No. 23 South Florida †	Imperial Arena ● Paradise Island, Bahamas	Battle 4 Atlantis	L 53–77	0–4
Nov 21	Virginia	No. 20 UCLA	Pauley Pavilion ● Los Angeles, CA	―	L 57–69	0–5
Nov 25	No. 5 NC State	No. 2 Maryland †	Baha Mar Convention Center ● Nassau, Bahamas	Baha Mar Hoops Pink Flamingo Championship	W 78–60	1–5
Nov 25	No. 23 Texas A&M	Pittsburgh †	Sports and Fitness Center ● Saint Thomas, U.S. Virgin Islands	Paradise Jam	L 46–57	1–6
Nov 27	Miami (FL)	No. 4 Indiana †	Baha Mar Convention Center ● Nassau, Bahamas	Baha Mar Hoops Pink Flamingo Championship	L 51–53	1–7
Nov 27	No. 16 Oregon State	Notre Dame †	Ocean Center ● Daytona Beach, FL	Daytona Beach Invitational	W 64–62	2–7
Dec 1	No. 18т Ohio State	Syracuse	Carrier Dome ● Syracuse, NY	ACC–Big Ten Women's Challenge	W 97–91	3–7
Dec 2	No. 2т NC State	No. 6 Indiana	Simon Skjodt Assembly Hall ● Bloomington, IN	ACC–Big Ten Women's Challenge	W 66–58	4–7
Dec 2	No. 12 Michigan	No. 10 Louisville	KFC Yum! Center ● Louisville, KY	ACC–Big Ten Women's Challenge	W 70–48	5–7
Dec 2	Miami (FL)	No. 8 Maryland	Xfinity Center ● College Park, MD	ACC–Big Ten Women's Challenge	L 74–82	5–8
Dec 2	No. 9 Iowa	Duke	Cameron Indoor Stadium ● Durham, NC	ACC–Big Ten Women's Challenge	W 79–64	6–8
Dec 5	No. 24 Notre Dame	No. 2т Connecticut	Gampel Pavilion ● Storrs, CT	―	L 54–73	6–9
Dec 5	No. 11 Tennessee	Virginia Tech	Cassell Coliseum ● Blacksburg, VA	―	L 58–64	6–10
Dec 5	Georgia Tech	No. 20 Georgia	Stegeman Coliseum ● Athens, GA	Rivalry	W 55–54	7–10
Dec 9	No. 3 Connecticut	Georgia Tech	McCamish Pavilion ● Atlanta, GA	―	W 57–44	8–10
Dec 12	No. 14 Kentucky	No. 7 Louisville	KFC Yum! Center ● Louisville, KY	Jimmy V Classic	W 64–58	9–10
Dec 15	No. 1 South Carolina	No. 15 Duke	Cameron Indoor Stadium ● Durham, NC	―	L 46–55	7–11
Dec 16	No. 17 Georgia	No. 2 NC State	Reynolds Coliseum ● Raleigh, NC	―	L 80–82^{OT}	7–12
Dec 19	No. 6 Louisville	No. 7т Connecticut †	Mohegan Sun Arena ● Uncasville, CT	Basketball Hall of Fame Women's Showcase	W 69–64	8–12
Dec 20	Clemson	No. 21 LSU †	Massimino Court ● West Palm Beach, FL	West Palm Beach Invitational	L 56–70	8–13
Mar 18	No. 16 Virginia Tech	No. 23 Florida Gulf Coast †	Xfinity Center ● College Park, MD	NCAA First Round	L 81–84	8–14
Mar 20	Miami (FL)	No. 1 South Carolina	Colonial Life Arena ● Columbia, SC	NCAA Second Round	L 33–49	8–15
Mar 21	No. 17 North Carolina	No. 19 Arizona	McKale Center ● Tucson, AZ	NCAA Second Round	W 63–45	9–15
Mar 21	No. 21 Notre Dame	No. 22 Oklahoma	Lloyd Noble Center ● Norman, OK	NCAA Second Round	W 108–64	10–15
Mar 25	No. 17 North Carolina	No. 1 South Carolina †	Greensboro Coliseum ● Greensboro, NC	NCAA Sweet Sixteen	L 61–69	10–16
Mar 26	No. 4 Louisville	No. 18 Tennessee †	Intrust Bank Arena ● Wichita, KS	NCAA Sweet Sixteen	W 76–64	11–16
Mar 28	No. 3 NC State	No. 5 UConn †	Total Mortgage Arena ● Bridgeport, CT	NCAA Elite Eight	L 87–91^{2OT}	11–17
Mar 28	No. 4 Louisville	No. 12 Michigan †	Intrust Bank Arena ● Wichita, KS	NCAA Elite Eight	W 62–50	12–17
April 1	No. 4 Louisville	No. 1 South Carolina †	Target Center ● Minneapolis, MN	NCAA Final Four	L 59–72	12–18

Team rankings are reflective of AP poll when the game was played, not current or final ranking

† denotes game was played on neutral site

=== Rankings ===
Legend
Increase in ranking
Decrease in ranking
Not ranked previous week
First Place votes shown in ()

		Pre	Wk 2	Wk 3	Wk 4	Wk 5	Wk 6	Wk 7	Wk 8	Wk 9	Wk 10	Wk 11	Wk 12	Wk 13	Wk 14	Wk 15	Wk 16	Wk 17	Wk 18	Final
Boston College	AP																			
Boston College	C																			
Clemson	AP																			
Clemson	C																			
Duke	AP			RV	RV	19	15	16	15	17	16	21	21	RV	RV					
Duke	C				RV	25	23	22	22	21	24	23	RV	RV						
Florida State	AP	16	17	17	25	RV														
Florida State	C	24	22	RV	RV	RV														
Georgia Tech	AP	17т	18	RV	RV	RV	18	17	16	16	15	18	14	12	11	16	22	25	RV	RV
Georgia Tech	C	20	25	RV	RV	21	19	16	17	16	18	17	17	16	18	24	25	RV	RV	RV
Louisville	AP	6	10	10	10	7	6	3	3	3 (5)	3 (4)	3 (2)	5	4	3	3	4	4	5	4
Louisville	C	6	7	5	5	4	3	2	2 (14)	2 (7)	2 (6)	4	4	3	3	4	4	5	4	4
Miami	AP																		RV	RV
Miami	C																			
North Carolina	AP				RV	RV	25	25	24	19	21	20	RV	24	23	24	18	16	18	17
North Carolina	C	RV	RV	RV	24	20	20	18	15	18	20	22	23	22	23	18	17	18	18	16
NC State	AP	5	5	5	2т	2	2	5	5	5	4	4	3 (1)	3 (1)	5	4	3	3	3 (2)	3 (1)
NC State	C	4	4	3	3	2	4	4	4	4	4	3	3	5	4	3	3	3 (1)	3	5
Notre Dame	AP	RV	RV	RV	24	22	21	20	17	20	20	19	20	20	18	19	14	20	22	21
Notre Dame	C	RV	RV	25	23	18	17	15	19	19	17	18	19	19	20	16	20	21	21	17
Pittsburgh	AP																			
Pittsburgh	C																			
Syracuse	AP																			
Syracuse	C																			
Virginia	AP																			
Virginia	C	RV																		
Virginia Tech	AP	24	25	24	RV	RV				RV	RV	RV	RV	RV	RV	23	23	21	17	16
Virginia Tech	C	RV	RV	RV	RV				RV		RV	RV	RV	RV	24	RV	24	23	23	25
Wake Forest	AP																			
Wake Forest	C		RV	RV		RV														

Note: The Coaches Poll releases a final poll after the NCAA tournament, but the AP Poll does not release a poll at this time. Coaches poll did not release a poll when the AP released its week 2 poll.

=== Conference Matrix ===
This table summarizes the head-to-head results between teams in conference play. Each team played 18 conference games, and at least 1 against each opponent. The conference returned to an 18-game schedule after playing 20 games last season due to the COVID-19 pandemic.

	Boston College	Clemson	Duke	Florida State	Georgia Tech	Louisville	Miami	North Carolina	NC State	Notre Dame	Pittsburgh	Syracuse	Virginia	Virginia Tech	Wake Forest
vs. Boston College	–	74–80	51–67	66–58	68–49	79–49; 63–53	66–79	76–73	85–78 (OT)	71–73; 74–61	64–75; 57–69	71–95; 75–91	57–65	85–62	70–82
vs. Clemson	80–74	–	64–61	79–68; 75–70	69–62; 92–84 (OT)	93–71	69–60; 76–40	81–62	79–52	77–56	78–73 (OT)	86–46	55–59	73–42	44–66; 78–87
vs. Duke	67–51	61–64	–	59–56	59–46	77–65	49–58	78–62; 74–46	84–60; 77–62	70–72	39–54	65–74	48–57; 67–54	77–55; 65–54	76–81
vs. Florida State	58–66	68–79; 70–75	56–59	–	68–64; 63–65 (OT)	75–62	59–52; 76–59	64–49	68–48	65–70	52–57	67–73	37–62	92–75	75–69 (OT); 46–87
vs. Georgia Tech	49–68	62–69; 84–92 (OT)	46–59	64–68; 65–63 (OT)	–	50–48	46–45; 51–39	38–55	59–48	72–66 (OT)	52–63	55–65	31–67	73–63	45–62; 56–64
vs. Louisville	49–79; 53–63	71–93	65–77	62–75	48–50	–	66–69	66–65	68–59	47–73; 64–86	39–81; 55–66	71–84; 64–100	L via forfeit	56–70	60–72
vs. Miami	79–66	60–69; 40–76	58–49	52–59; 59–76	45–46; 39–51	69–66	–	85–38	76–64	69–53	50–60	65–71	55–71	70–63	47–46; 59–66
vs. North Carolina	73–76	62–81	62–78; 46–74	49–64	55–38	65–66	38–85	–	72–45; 66–58	70–65	54–64	43–79	52–61; 57–68	46–71; 66–61	59–78
vs. NC State	78–85 (OT)	52–79	60–84; 62–77	48–68	48–59	59–68	64–76	45–72; 58–66	–	69–66	54–89	53–95	55–82; 43–66	45–51; 66–68	61–92
vs. Notre Dame	73–71; 61–74	56–77	72–70	70–65	66–72 (OT)	73–47; 86–64	53–69	65–70	66–69	–	59–85; 63–77	56–82; 62–83	L via forfeit	55–68	64–74
vs. Pittsburgh	75–64; 69–57	73–78 (OT)	54–39	57–52	63–52	81–39; 66–55	60–50	64–54	89–54	85–59; 77–63	–	80–72; 67–65	74–65	75–65	57–65
vs. Syracuse	95–71; 91–75	46–86	74–65	73–67	65–55	84–71; 100–64	71–65	79–43	95–53	82–56; 83–62	72–80; 65–67	–	70–77	102–53	76–60
vs. Virginia	65–57	59–55	57–48; 54–67	62–37	67–31	W via forfeit	71–55	61–52; 68–57	82–55; 66–43	W via forfeit	65–74	77–70	–	69–52; 71–42	68–53
vs. Virginia Tech	62–85	42–73	55–77; 54–65	75–92	63–73	70–56	63–70	71–46; 61–66	51–45; 68–66	68–55	65–75	53–102	52–69; 42–71	–	53–66
vs. Wake Forest	82–70	66–44; 87–78	81–76	69–75 (OT); 87–46	62–45; 64–56	72–60	46–47; 66–59	78–59	92–61	74–64	65–57	60–76	53–68	66–53	–
Total	10–8	3–15	7–11	10–8	11–7	16–2	10–8	13–5	17–1	13–5	2–16	4–14	2–16	13–5	4–14

=== Player of the week ===
Throughout the conference regular season, the Atlantic Coast Conference offices named a Player(s) of the week and a Rookie(s) of the week.

Week	Player of the week	Rookie of the week	Reference
Week 1 – Nov 15	Elizabeth Kitley – Virginia Tech	Sonia Citron – Notre Dame	
Week 1 – Nov 15	Jewel Spear – Wake Forest	Sonia Citron – Notre Dame	
Week 2 – Nov 22	Elizabeth Kitley (2) – Virginia Tech	Sonia Citron (2) – Notre Dame	
Week 3 – Nov 29	Diamond Johnson – NC State	Shayeann Day-Wilson – Duke	
Week 4 – Dec 6	Teisha Hyman – Syracuse	Sonia Citron (3) – Notre Dame	
Week 5 – Dec 13	Lorela Cubaj – Georgia Tech	Lashae Dwyer – Miami	
Week 6 – Dec 20	Elizabeth Kitley (3) – Virginia Tech	Sonia Citron (4) – Notre Dame	
Week 7 – Dec 27	Maya Dodson – Notre Dame	Maria Gakdeng – Boston College	
Week 8 – Jan 3	Elizabeth Kitley (4) – Virginia Tech	Maria Gakdeng (2) – Boston College	
Week 9 – Jan 10	Cameron Swartz – Boston College	Maria Gakdeng (3) – Boston College	
Week 10 – Jan 17	Dana Mabrey – Notre Dame	Maria Gakdeng (4) – Boston College	
Week 11 – Jan 24	Taylor Soule – Boston College	Shayeann Day-Wilson (2) – Duke	
Week 12 – Jan 31	Olivia Miles – Notre Dame	Sonia Citron (5) – Notre Dame	
Week 13 – Feb 7	Delicia Washington – Clemson	Shayeann Day-Wilson (3) – Duke	
Week 13 – Feb 7	Kianna Smith – Louisville	Shayeann Day-Wilson (3) – Duke	
Week 14 – Feb 14	Delicia Washington (2) – Clemson	Sonia Citron (6) – Notre Dame	
Week 14 – Feb 14	Georgia Amoore – Virginia Tech	Sonia Citron (6) – Notre Dame	
Week 15 – Feb 21	Deja Kelly – North Carolina	Ja’Leah Williams – Miami	
Week 16 – Feb 28	Emily Engstler – Louisville	Maria Gakdeng (5) – Boston College	

== Postseason ==
=== ACC tournament ===
First round Wednesday, March 2
12	Syracuse	69
13	Clemson	88
10	Duke	55
15	Pittsburgh	52
11	Wake Forest	61
14	Virginia	53

Second round Thursday, March 3
8	Boston College	58
9	Florida State	63
5	Virginia Tech	82
13	Clemson	60
7	Miami	61
10	Duke	55
6	Georgia Tech	45
11	Wake Forest	40

Quarterfinals; Friday, March 4
1	NC State	84
9	Florida State	54
4	North Carolina	80
5	Virginia Tech	87 (OT)
2	Louisville	59
7	Miami	61
3	Notre Dame	71
6	Georgia Tech	53

Semifinals; Saturday, March 5
1	NC State	70
5	Virginia Tech	55
7	Miami	57
3	Notre Dame	54

Championship; Sunday, March 6
1	NC State	60
7	Miami	47

=== NCAA tournament ===
Seed	Region	School	First Four	1st Round	2nd Round	Sweet 16	Elite Eight	Final Four	Championship
1	Wichita	Louisville	Bye	W 83–51 vs. #16 Albany – (Louisville, KY)	W 68–59 vs. #9 Gonzaga – (Louisville, KY)	W 76–64 vs. #4 Tennessee – (Wichita, KS)	W 62–50 vs. #3 Michigan – (Wichita, KS)	L 59–72 vs. #1 South Carolina – (Minneapolis, MN)	
1	Bridgeport	NC State	Bye	W 96–68 vs. #16 Longwood – (Raleigh, NC)	W 89–57 vs. #9 Kansas State – (Raleigh, NC)	W 66–63 vs. #5 Notre Dame – (Bridgeport, CT)	L 87–91 (2OT) vs. #2 UConn – (Bridgeport, CT)		
5	Greensboro	North Carolina	Bye	W 79–66 vs. #12 Stephen F. Austin – (Tucson, AZ)	W 63–45 at #4 Arizona – (Tucson, AZ)	L 61–69 vs. #1 South Carolina – (Greensboro, NC)			
5	Bridgeport	Notre Dame	Bye	W 89–79 vs. #12 UMass – (Norman, OK)	W 108–64 at #4 Oklahoma – (Norman, OK)	L 63–66 vs. #1 NC State – (Bridgeport, CT)			
5	Spokane	Virginia Tech	Bye	L 81–84 vs. #12 Florida Gulf Coast – (College Park, MD)					
8	Greensboro	Miami (FL)	Bye	W 78–66 vs. #9 South Florida – (Columbia, SC)	L 33–49 at #1 South Carolina – (Columbia, SC)				
9	Spokane	Georgia Tech	Bye	L 58–77 vs. #8 Kansas – (Stanford, CA)					
11	Spokane	Florida State	L 51–60 vs. #11 Missouri State – (Baton Rouge, LA)						
		W–L (%):	0–1 (.000)	5–2 (.714)	4–1 (.800)	2–2 (.500)	1–1 (.500)	0–1 (.000)	0–0 (–) Total: 12–8 (.600)

=== National Invitation tournament ===
Bracket	School	First round	Second round	Third round	Quarterfinals	Semifinals	Championship
Region 2	Boston College	W 69–44 vs. Maine – (Boston, MA)	W 94–68 vs. Quinnipiac – (Boston, MA)	L 51–54 at Columbia – (New York, NY)			
Region 4	Wake Forest	W 71–59 vs. Akron – (Winston-Salem, NC)	L 55–67 at Middle Tennessee – (Murfreesboro, TN)				
	W–L (%):	2–0 (1.000)	1–1 (.500)	0–1 (.000)	0–0 (–)	0–0 (–)	0–0 (–) Total: 3–2 (.600)

== Honors and awards ==
=== ACC Awards ===
The ACC announced its end of season awards on March 1, 2022, ahead of the start of the ACC tournament.

2021 ACC Women's Basketball Individual Awards
Award	Recipient(s)
Player of the Year	Elizabeth Kitley – Virginia Tech
Coach of the Year	Wes Moore – NC State
Defensive Player of the Year	Lorela Cubaj – Georgia Tech
Freshman of the Year	Sonia Citron – Notre Dame (Blue Ribbon); Shayeann Day-Wilson – Duke (head coaches)
Sixth Player of the Year	Diamond Johnson – NC State
Most Improved Player	Cameron Swartz – Boston College

2021 ACC Women's Basketball All-Conference Teams (Blue Ribbon Panel)
First Team	Second Team	Honorable Mention	Freshman Team
Cameron Swartz – Boston College; Delicia Washington – Clemson; Lorela Cubaj – Georgia Tech; Emily Engstler – Louisville; Hailey Van Lith – Louisville; Deja Kelly – North Carolina; Elissa Cunane – NC State; Olivia Miles – Notre Dame; Elizabeth Kitley – Virginia Tech; Jewel Spear – Wake Forest	Taylor Soule – Boston College; Morgan Jones – Florida State; Alyssa Ustby – North Carolina; Maya Dodson – Notre Dame; Aisha Sheppard – Virginia Tech	Lotta-Maj Lahtinen – Georgia Tech; Kelsey Marshall – Miami; Diamond Johnson – NC State; Kayla Jones – NC State; Teisha Hyman – Syracuse; Georgia Amoore – Virginia Tech	Maria Gakdeng – Boston College; Shayeann Day-Wilson – Duke; O’Mariah Gordon – Florida State; Makayla Timpson – Florida State; Payton Verhulst – Louisville; Ja’Leah Williams – Miami; Aziaha James – NC State; Sonia Citron – Notre Dame

2021 ACC Women's Basketball All-Conference Teams (head coaches)
First Team	Second Team	Honorable Mention	Freshman Team
Cameron Swartz – Boston College; Morgan Jones – Florida State; Lorela Cubaj – Georgia Tech; Emily Engstler – Louisville; Hailey Van Lith – Louisville; Deja Kelly – North Carolina; Elissa Cunane – NC State; Maya Dodson – Notre Dame; Olivia Miles – Notre Dame; Elizabeth Kitley – Virginia Tech	Taylor Soule – Boston College; Delicia Washington – Clemson; Kayla Jones – NC State; Aisha Sheppard – Virginia Tech; Jewel Spear – Wake Forest	Kelsey Marshall – Miami; Georgia Amoore – Virginia Tech	Maria Gakdeng – Boston College; Shayeann Day-Wilson – Duke; O’Mariah Gordon – Florida State; Makayla Timpson – Florida State; Payton Verhulst – Louisville; Ja’Leah Williams – Miami; Aziaha James – NC State; Sonia Citron – Notre Dame

2021 ACC Women's Basketball All-ACC Defensive Team
Player	Team
Lorela Cubaj	Georgia Tech
Emily Engstler	Louisville
Mykasa Robinson	Louisville
Maya Dodson	Notre Dame
Elizabeth Kitley	Virginia Tech

== WNBA draft ==
The ACC had seven players selected in the WNBA Draft. This was the seventeenth consecutive year the league had a player selected, which is the longest of any conference. Their seven players tied for the most players selected from a single conference selected in the draft.

Player	Team	Round	Pick #	Position	School
Emily Engstler	Indiana Fever	1	4	Forward	Louisville
Kianna Smith	Los Angeles Sparks	2	16	Guard	Louisville
Elissa Cunane	Seattle Storm	2	17	Center	NC State
Lorela Cubaj	Seattle Storm	2	18	Forward	Georgia Tech
Kayla Jones	Minnesota Lynx	2	22	Forward	NC State
Aisha Sheppard	Las Vegas Aces	2	23	Guard	Virginia Tech
Maya Dodson	Phoenix Mercury	3	26	Forward/center	Notre Dame
