= 2021–22 Louisville Cardinals women's basketball team =

Intercollegiate basketball season

2021–22 Louisville Cardinals women's basketball

NCAA tournament, Final Four
- Conference: Atlantic Coast Conference

Ranking
- Coaches: No. 4
- AP: No. 4
- Record: 29–5 (16–2 ACC)
- Head coach: Jeff Walz (15th season)
- Assistant coaches: Stephanie Norman; Sam Purcell; Jonneshia Pineda
- Home arena: KFC Yum! Center

2021–22 ACC women's basketball standings
	Conf.				Overall
Team	W		L	PCT	W		L	PCT
No. 3 NC State †	17	–	1	.944	32	–	4	.889
No. 4 Louisville	16	–	2	.889	29	–	5	.853
No. 17 North Carolina	13	–	5	.722	25	–	7	.781
No. 21 Notre Dame	13	–	5	.722	24	–	9	.727
No. 16 Virginia Tech	13	–	5	.722	23	–	10	.697
Georgia Tech	11	–	7	.611	21	–	11	.656
Boston College	10	–	8	.556	21	–	12	.636
Miami (FL)	10	–	8	.556	21	–	13	.618
Florida State	10	–	8	.556	17	–	14	.548
Duke	7	–	11	.389	17	–	13	.567
Wake Forest	4	–	14	.222	16	–	17	.485
Syracuse	4	–	14	.222	11	–	18	.379
Clemson	3	–	15	.167	10	–	21	.323
Pittsburgh	2	–	16	.111	11	–	19	.367
Virginia	2	–	16	.111	5	–	22	.185
† 2022 ACC tournament winner Rankings from AP poll

The 2021–22 Louisville Cardinals women's basketball team represented the University of Louisville during the 2021–22 NCAA Division I women's basketball season. The Cardinals were led by 15th-year head coach Jeff Walz, and played their home games at the KFC Yum! Center in their eighth year in the Atlantic Coast Conference.

They finished the season 29–5 overall and 16–2 in ACC play to finish in second place. As the second seed in the ACC tournament, they were upset by seventh seed Miami in the quarterfinals. They received an at-large bid to the NCAA tournament and were the first seed in the Wichita Regional. They defeated sixteenth seed Albany in the first round, ninth seed Gonzaga in the second round, fourth seed Tennessee in the Sweet Sixteen, and third seed Michigan in the Elite Eight before falling to eventual champions, and first seed South Carolina in the Final Four. This was the Cardinals' fourth appearance in the Final Four in program history.

== Previous season ==
The Cardinals finished the season 26–4 and 14–2 in ACC play to finish in first place. In the ACC tournament, they defeated Wake Forest in the quarterfinals and Syracuse before losing in the final to NC State. They received an at-large bid to the NCAA tournament, where they were the two seed in the Alamo Regional. In the tournament they defeated fifteen seed Marist in the first round, seven seed Northwestern in the second round, and six seed Oregon in the Sweet Sixteen before losing to one seed and eventual champions Stanford in the Elite Eight to end their season.

== Off-season ==
=== Departures ===
Departures
Name	Number	Pos.	Height	Year	Hometown	Reason for departure
Dana Evans	1	G	5'6"	Senior	Gary, Indiana	Graduated; Drafted 13th overall in the 2021 WNBA draft by the Dallas Wings
Malea Williams	3	F	6'4"	Freshman	Georgetown, Kentucky	Transferred to Cincinnati
Elizabeth Balogun	4	G	6'1"	Junior	Chattanooga, Tennessee	Transferred to Duke

=== Incoming transfers ===
Incoming transfers
Name	Number	Pos.	Height	Year	Hometown	Previous school
Emily Engstler	21	F	6'1"	Senior	New York, New York	Syracuse
Chelsie Hall	23	G	5'7"	Graduate student	Boca Raton, Florida	Vanderbilt

=== Recruiting class ===
College recruiting
Name	Hometown	School	Height	Weight	Commit date
Payton Verhulst; G	De Soto, Kansas	Bishop Miege	6 ft 1 in (1.85 m)	N/A	
Payton Verhulst; G	Recruit ratings: ESPN: (97)				
Sydni Schetnan; F	Sioux Falls, SD	Washington	6 ft 5 in (1.96 m)	N/A	
Sydni Schetnan; F	Recruit ratings: ESPN: (90)				
Overall recruit ranking:
Note: In many cases, Scout, Rivals, 247Sports, On3, and ESPN may conflict in their listings of height and weight.; In these cases, the average was taken. ESPN grades are on a 100-point scale.; Sources:

== Roster ==
2021–22 Louisville Cardinals women's basketball team
Players
Coaches

Pos.	#	Name	Height	Year	Previous school	Hometown
F	0	Ramani Parker	6 ft 4 in (1.93 m)	RS So	Montverde Academy	Fresno, CA
G	2	Ahlana Smith	5 ft 9 in (1.75 m)	Jr	Mallard Creek; Gulf Coast State	Charlotte, NC
F	3	Alexia Mobley	6 ft 2 in (1.88 m)	Fr	Reynoldsburg	Reynoldsburgh, OH
G	5	Mykasa Robinson	5 ft 7 in (1.7 m)	Sr	Ashland Blazer	Ashland, KY
G	10	Hailey Van Lith	5 ft 7 in (1.7 m)	So	Cashmere	Wenatchee, WA
G	11	Norika Konno	5 ft 10 in (1.78 m)	Jr	Seiwa Gakuen	Sendai, Japan
G	12	Payton Verhulst	6 ft 1 in (1.85 m)	Fr	Bishop Miege	De Soto, KS
G	13	Merissah Russell	5 ft 11 in (1.8 m)	So	Cairine Wilson	Ottawa, Ontario
G	14	Kianna Smith	6 ft 0 in (1.83 m)	RS Sr	Troy; California	Moreno Valley, CA
F	21	Emily Engstler	6 ft 1 in (1.85 m)	Sr	St. Francis Prep; Syracuse	New York, NY
F	22	Elizabeth Dixon	6 ft 5 in (1.96 m)	Sr	Ridgeway; Georgia Tech	Memphis, TN
G	23	Chelsie Hall	5 ft 7 in (1.7 m)	GS	Seffner Christian; Vanderbilt	Boca Raton, FL
F	44	Olivia Cochran	6 ft 3 in (1.91 m)	So	Carver	Columbus, GA
F	45	Sydni Schetnan	6 ft 5 in (1.96 m)	Fr	Washington	Sioux Falls, SD

Head coach

- Jeff Walz (Northern Kentucky)

Assistant coach(es)

- Stephanie Norman (Arizona State)
- Sam Purcell (Auburn)
- Jonneshia Pineda (Georgia Southwestern State)

Legend

- (C) Team captain
- (S) Suspended
- (I) Ineligible
- (W) Walk-on
- Injured
- Current redshirt

Roster
Last update: October 29, 2021

== Schedule and results ==
Date time, TV	Rank^{#}	Opponent^{#}	Result	Record	Site (attendance) city, state
Exhibition
November 4, 2021*; 7:00 p.m.	No. 6	Union	W 106–32	–	KFC Yum! Center (6,587); Louisville, KY
Non-conference regular season
November 12, 2021*; 4:30 p.m., ESPNU	No. 6	vs. No. 22 Arizona; The Invitational	L 59–61 ^{OT}	0–1	Sanford Pentagon (2,345); Sioux Falls, SD
November 16, 2021*; 7:00 p.m., ACCNX	No. 10	Bellarmine	W 82–25	1–1	KFC Yum! Center (7,014); Louisville, KY
November 17, 2021*; 7:00 p.m., ACCNX	No. 10	UT Martin	W 62–30	2–1	KFC Yum! Center (6,809); Louisville, KY
November 20, 2021*; 5:00 p.m., P12N+	No. 10	at Washington	W 61–53	3–1	Hec Edmundson Pavilion (1,884); Seattle, WA
November 23, 2021*; 8:00 p.m., ESPN+	No. 10	at Cal Poly	W 72–32	4–1	Mott Center (662); San Luis Obispo, CA
November 28, 2021*; 2:00 p.m., MWSN	No. 10	at Colorado State	W 71–45	5–1	Moby Arena (1,336); Fort Collins, CO
December 2, 2021*; 7:00 p.m., ESPN	No. 10	No. 12 Michigan; ACC–Big Ten Women's Challenge	W 70–48	6–1	KFC Yum! Center (7,309); Louisville, KY
December 5, 2021*; Noon, ACCN	No. 10	Belmont	W 80–66	7–1	KFC Yum! Center (7,092); Louisville, KY
December 12, 2021*; 1:00 p.m., ESPN	No. 7	No. 14 Kentucky; Jimmy V Classic/Rivalry	W 64–58	8–1	KFC Yum! Center (12,167); Louisville, KY
December 16, 2021*; 8:00 p.m., ACCN	No. 6	Eastern Kentucky	W 82–38	9–1	KFC Yum! Center (6,937); Louisville, KY
December 19, 2021*; 3:30 p.m., ESPN	No. 6	at No. 7т UConn; Basketball Hall of Fame Women's Showcase	W 69–64	10–1	Mohegan Sun Arena (8,204); Uncasville, CT
ACC regular season
December 30, 2021; 7:00 p.m., ACCNX	No. 3	Boston College	W 79–49	11–1 (1–0)	KFC Yum! Center (7,709); Louisville, KY
January 2, 2022; Noon, ACCN	No. 3	at No. 16 Georgia Tech	W 50–48	12–1 (2–0)	McCamish Pavilion (1,918); Atlanta, GA
January 6, 2022; 6:00 p.m., ACCN	No. 3	Pittsburgh	W 81–39	13–1 (3–0)	KFC Yum! Center (6,703); Louisville, KY
January 9, 2022; Noon, ACCN	No. 3	at Miami (FL)	Postponed due to COVID-19 Issues		Watsco Center; Coral Gables, FL
January 13, 2022; 7:00 p.m., ACCNX	No. 3	Syracuse	W 84–71	14–1 (4–0)	KFC Yum! Center (7,307); Louisville, KY
January 16, 2022; Noon, ACCN	No. 3	at Boston College	W 63–53	15–1 (5–0)	Conte Forum (1,066); Chestnut Hill, MA
January 20, 2022; 7:30 p.m., ESPN	No. 3	at No. 4 NC State	L 59–68	15–2 (5–1)	Reynolds Coliseum (5,500); Raleigh, NC
January 23, 2022; 2:00 p.m., ACCN	No. 3	Wake Forest	W 72–60	16–2 (6–1)	KFC Yum! Center (8,802); Louisville, KY
January 27, 2022; 8:00 p.m., ACCN	No. 5	Florida State	W 75–62	17–2 (7–1)	KFC Yum! Center (7,755); Louisville, KY
January 30, 2022; 3:00 p.m., ESPN	No. 5	No. 21 Duke	W 77–65	18–2 (8–1)	KFC Yum! Center (9,001); Louisville, KY
February 1, 2022; 7:00 p.m., ACCNX	No. 4	at Miami (FL); Rescheduled from Jan 9, 2022	W 69–66	19–2 (9–1)	Watsco Center; Coral Gables, FL
February 3, 2022; 6:00 p.m., ACCRSN	No. 4	at Clemson	W 93–71	20–2 (10–1)	Littlejohn Coliseum (493); Clemson, SC
February 6, 2022; Noon, ACCRSN	No. 4	at Syracuse	W 100–64	21–2 (11–1)	Carrier Dome (1,401); Syracuse, NY
February 10, 2022; 7:00 p.m., ACCNX	No. 3	Virginia	Forfeited to Louisville due to Virginia's travel issues.		KFC Yum! Center; Louisville, KY
February 13, 2022; 2:00 p.m., ESPN	No. 3	No. 18 Notre Dame	W 73–47	22–2 (13–1)	KFC Yum! Center (10,056); Louisville, KY
February 17, 2022; 6:00 p.m., ACCRSN	No. 3	at No. 24 North Carolina	L 65–66	22–3 (13–2)	Carmichael Arena (2,115); Chapel Hill, NC
February 20, 2022; 2:00 p.m., ACCN	No. 3	No. 23 Virginia Tech	W 70–56	23–3 (14–2)	KFC Yum! Center (10,294); Louisville, KY
February 24, 2022; 6:00 p.m., ACCNX	No. 4	at Pittsburgh	W 66–55	24–3 (15–2)	Peterson Events Center (1,344); Pittsburgh, PA
February 27, 2022; Noon, ESPN2	No. 4	at No. 14 Notre Dame	W 86–64	25–3 (16–2)	Purcell Pavilion (7,531); Notre Dame, IN
ACC Women's Tournament
March 4, 2022; 6:00 p.m., ACCRSN	(2) No. 4	vs. (7) Miami (FL); Quarterfinals	L 59–61	25–4	Greensboro Coliseum (5,682); Greensboro, NC
NCAA tournament
March 18, 2022; 6:00 p.m., ESPN2	(1 W) No. 4	(16 W) Albany; First Round	W 83–51	26–4	KFC Yum! Center (8,407); Louisville, KY
March 20, 2022; 7:00 p.m., ESPN	(1 W) No. 4	(9 W) Gonzaga; Second Round	W 68–59	27–4	KFC Yum! Center (10,414); Louisville, KY
March 26, 2022; 4:00 p.m., ESPN2	(1 W) No. 4	vs. (4 W) No. 18 Tennessee; Sweet Sixteen	W 76–64	28–4	Intrust Bank Arena; Wichita, KS
March 28, 2022; 9:00 p.m., ESPN	(1 W) No. 4	vs. (3 W) No. 12 Michigan; Elite Eight	W 62–50	29–4	Intrust Bank Arena (4,695); Wichita, KS
April 1, 2022; 7:00 p.m., ESPN	(1 W) No. 4	vs. (1 G) No. 1 South Carolina; Final Four	L 59–72	29–5	Target Center (18,978); Minneapolis, MN
*Non-conference game. ^{#}Rankings from AP Poll. (#) Tournament seedings in parentheses. W=Wichita. All times are in Eastern.

== Rankings ==
Regular season polls
Poll	Pre- season	Week 2	Week 3	Week 4	Week 5	Week 6	Week 7	Week 8	Week 9	Week 10	Week 11	Week 12	Week 13	Week 14	Week 15	Week 16	Week 17	Week 18	Final
AP	6	10	10	10	7	6	3	3	3 (5)	3 (4)	3 (2)	5	4	3	3	4	4	5	4
Coaches	6	7	5	5	4	3	2	2 (14)	2 (7)	2 (6)	4	4	3	3	4	4	5	4	4

Legend
	Increase in ranking
	Decrease in ranking
	Not ranked previous week
(RV)	Received votes
