= 2021–22 Virginia Tech Hokies women's basketball team =

Intercollegiate basketball season

2021–22 Virginia Tech Hokies women's basketball

NCAA tournament, first round
- Conference: Atlantic Coast Conference

Ranking
- Coaches: No. 25
- AP: No. 16
- Record: 23–10 (13–5 ACC)
- Head coach: Kenny Brooks (6th season)
- Assistant coaches: Shawn Poppie; Lindsey Hicks; Camille Collier
- Home arena: Cassell Coliseum

2021–22 ACC women's basketball standings
	Conf.				Overall
Team	W		L	PCT	W		L	PCT
No. 3 NC State †	17	–	1	.944	32	–	4	.889
No. 4 Louisville	16	–	2	.889	29	–	5	.853
No. 17 North Carolina	13	–	5	.722	25	–	7	.781
No. 21 Notre Dame	13	–	5	.722	24	–	9	.727
No. 16 Virginia Tech	13	–	5	.722	23	–	10	.697
Georgia Tech	11	–	7	.611	21	–	11	.656
Boston College	10	–	8	.556	21	–	12	.636
Miami (FL)	10	–	8	.556	21	–	13	.618
Florida State	10	–	8	.556	17	–	14	.548
Duke	7	–	11	.389	17	–	13	.567
Wake Forest	4	–	14	.222	16	–	17	.485
Syracuse	4	–	14	.222	11	–	18	.379
Clemson	3	–	15	.167	10	–	21	.323
Pittsburgh	2	–	16	.111	11	–	19	.367
Virginia	2	–	16	.111	5	–	22	.185
† 2022 ACC tournament winner Rankings from AP poll

The 2021–22 Virginia Tech Hokies women's basketball team represented Virginia Polytechnic Institute and State University during the 2021–22 NCAA Division I women's basketball season. The Hokies, were led by sixth year head coach Kenny Brooks, and played their home games at Cassell Coliseum as members of the Atlantic Coast Conference.

The Hokies finished the season 23–10 overall and 13–5 in ACC play to finish in a three way tie for third place. As the fifth seed in the ACC tournament, they defeated thirteenth seed Clemson in the Second Round and fourth seed North Carolina in the Quarterfinals before losing to eventual champions and first seed NC State in the Semifinals. They received an at-large bid to the NCAA tournament where they were the fifth seed in the Spokane Region. They lost to twelfth seed Florida Gulf Coast in the First Round to end their season.

== Previous season ==
The Hokies finished the season 15–10 and 8–8 in ACC play to finish in seventh place. In the ACC tournament, they defeated to Miami in the Second Round before losing to eventual champions NC State in the Quarterfinals. They received an at-large bid to the NCAA tournament where they were the seven seed in the Riverwalk Regional. In the tournament they defeated ten seed Marquette in the First Round before losing to two seed Baylor in the Second Round to end their season.

== Off-season ==
=== Departures ===
Departures
Name	Number	Pos.	Height	Year	Hometown	Reason for departure
Makayla Ennis	0	G/F	6'0"	Sophomore	Ontario, Canada	Transferred to Hofstra
Da'ja Green	10	G	5'6"	(redshirt) Senior	Ellenwood, Georgia	Transferred to East Carolina
Shelby Calhoun	12	G	5'11"	Freshman	Louisville, Kentucky	Transferred to Xavier
Asiah Jones	23	F	6'3"	(redshirt) Senior	Sacramento, California	Graduated
Nevaeh Dean	31	F	6'2"	Freshman	Hamilton, Ohio	Transferred to Cincinnati
Alex Obouh Fegue	40	C	6'4"	(redshirt) Senior	Châteauroux, France	Transferred to UC San Diego

=== Incoming transfers ===
Incoming transfers
Name	Number	Pos.	Height	Year	Hometown	Previous school
Kayana Traylor	23	G	5'9"	Senior	Martinsville, Indiana	Purdue
Emily Lytle	24	G/F	5'11"	Graduate Student	Memphis, Tennessee	Liberty
Rochelle Norris	31	C	6'5"	(redshirt) Sophomore	Stafford, Virginia	West Virginia

== Roster ==
2021–22 Virginia Tech Hokies women's basketball team
Players
Coaches

Pos.	#	Name	Height	Year	Previous school	Hometown
G	2	Aisha Sheppard	5 ft 9 in (1.75 m)	GS	St. John's	Alexandria, VA
G	3	Chloe Brooks	5 ft 10 in (1.78 m)	RS Jr	Spotswood	Harrisonburg, VA
G	5	Georgia Amoore	5 ft 5 in (1.65 m)	So	Loretto College	Ballarat, Australia
F	11	D'asia Gregg	6 ft 2 in (1.88 m)	Sr	Wilson; Georgia Tech/Gulf Coast State	Florence, SC
G	15	Azana Baines	6 ft 1 in (1.85 m)	Jr	Gloucester Catholic; Duke	Blackwood, NJ
G	21	Shamarla King	6 ft 0 in (1.83 m)	RS Fr	Watkinson	Hartford, CT
G	22	Cayla King	5 ft 11 in (1.8 m)	Jr	Northwest Guilford	Greensboro, NC
G	23	Kayana Traylor	5 ft 9 in (1.75 m)	Sr	Martinsville; Purdue	Martinsville, IN
G/F	24	Emily Lytle	5 ft 11 in (1.8 m)	GS	Evangelical Christian School; Liberty	Memphis, TN
C	31	Rochelle Norris	6 ft 5 in (1.96 m)	RS So	New Hope Academy; West Virginia	Stafford, VA
C	33	Elizabeth Kitley	6 ft 6 in (1.98 m)	Jr	Northwest Guilford	Summerfield, NC
G/F	35	Taylor Geiman	6 ft 0 in (1.83 m)	Jr	South Western	Hanover, PA

Head coach

- Kenny Brooks (James Madison)

Assistant coach(es)

- Shawn Poppie (Limestone)
- Lindsey Hicks (Purdue)
- Camille Collier (Wake Forest)

Legend

- (C) Team captain
- (S) Suspended
- (I) Ineligible
- (W) Walk-on
- Injured
- Current redshirt

Roster

== Schedule ==
Date time, TV	Rank^{#}	Opponent^{#}	Result	Record	Site (attendance) city, state
Non-conference regular season
November 9, 2021*; 5:00 p.m., ACCNX	No. 24	Davidson	W 76–57	1–0	Cassell Coliseum (1,487); Blacksburg, VA
November 11, 2021*; 7:00 p.m., ESPN+	No. 24	at George Washington	W 75–38	2–0	Charles E. Smith Center (366); Washington, D.C.
November 14, 2021*; Noon, ESPN+	No. 24	at George Mason	W 81–52	3–0	EagleBank Arena (1,239); Fairfax, VA
November 17, 2021*; 7:00 p.m., ACCNX	No. 25	Coppin State	W 85–32	4–0	Cassell Coliseum (1,202); Blacksburg, VA
November 20, 2021*; 5:00 p.m., ACCNX	No. 25	Campbell	W 84–39	5–0	Cassell Coliseum (1,263); Blacksburg, VA
November 26, 2021*; 10:00 a.m., FloHoops	No. 24	vs. Missouri State; San Juan Shootout	L 68–76	5–1	Roberto Clemente Coliseum (200); San Juan, Puerto Rico
November 27, 2021*; 10:00 a.m., FloHoops	No. 24	vs. UT Martin; San Juan Shootout	W 54–49	6–1	Roberto Clemente Coliseum (200); San Juan, Puerto Rico
December 1, 2021*; 7:30 p.m., BTN+		at Wisconsin; ACC–Big Ten Women's Challenge	W 70–60	7–1	Kohl Center (2,096); Madison, WI
December 5, 2021*; 2:00 p.m., ACCN		No. 11 Tennessee	L 58–64	7–2	Cassell Coliseum (2,631); Blacksburg, VA
December 7, 2021*; 7:00 p.m., ESPN+		at Liberty	L 40–59	7–3	Liberty Arena (1,265); Lynchburg, VA
December 12, 2021*; 2:00 p.m., ACCNX		Radford; Rivalry	W 89–40	8–3	Cassell Coliseum (1,489); Blacksburg, VA
ACC regular season
December 19, 2021; 2:00 p.m., ACCN		at Florida State	W 92–75	9–3 (1–0)	Donald L. Tucker Center (2,155); Tallahassee, FL
December 30, 2021; 8:00 p.m., ACCN		No. 15 Duke	W 77–55	10–3 (2–0)	Cassell Coliseum (1,664); Blacksburg, VA
January 2, 2022; 4:00 p.m., ACCN		at Wake Forest	W 66–53	11–3 (3–0)	LJVM Coliseum (776); Winston–Salem, NC
January 6, 2022; 7:00 p.m., ACCNX		Virginia; Commonwealth Clash	Postponed due to COVID-19 issues		Cassell Coliseum; Blacksburg, VA
January 9, 2022; 6:00 p.m., ACCN		at No. 19 North Carolina	L 46–71	11–4 (3–1)	Carmichael Arena (1,547); Chapel Hill, NC
January 13, 2022; 6:00 p.m., ACCN		at No. 16 Duke	W 65–54	12–4 (4–1)	Cameron Indoor Stadium (2,209); Durham, NC
January 16, 2022; 6:00 p.m., ACCN		Clemson	Postponed due to inclement weather		Cassell Coliseum; Blacksburg, VA
January 18, 2022; 5:00 p.m., ACCN		Virginia; Commonwealth Clash; Rescheduled from Jan 6, 2022	W 69–52	13–4 (5–1)	Cassell Coliseum (1,518); Blacksburg, VA
January 20, 2022; 6:00 p.m., ACCN		Pittsburgh	W 75–65	14–4 (6–1)	Cassell Coliseum (1,472); Blacksburg, VA
January 23, 2022; 4:00 p.m., ACCN		at No. 4 NC State	L 45–51	14–5 (6–2)	Reynolds Coliseum (5,500); Raleigh, NC
January 27, 2022; 7:00 p.m., ACCNX		at Virginia; Commonwealth Clash	W 71–42	15–5 (7–2)	John Paul Jones Arena (1,779); Charlottesville, VA
February 3, 2022; 8:00 p.m., ACCN		at No. 20 Notre Dame	L 55–68	15–6 (7–3)	Purcell Pavilion (4,230); South Bend, IN
February 6, 2022; 2:00 p.m., ACCRSN		Boston College	W 85–62	16–6 (8–3)	Cassell Coliseum (1,649); Blacksburg, VA
February 8, 2022; 6:00 p.m., ACCNX		Clemson; Rescheduled from Jan. 16	W 73–42	17–6 (9–3)	Cassell Coliseum (1,232); Blacksburg, VA
February 10, 2022; 8:00 p.m., ACCRSN		No. 11 Georgia Tech	W 73–63	18–6 (10–3)	Cassell Coliseum (1,551); Blacksburg, VA
February 13, 2022; 1:00 p.m., ACCNX		No. 23 North Carolina	W 66–61	19–6 (11–3)	Cassell Coliseum (1,964); Blacksburg, VA
February 17, 2022; 7:00 p.m., ACCNX	No. 23	at Syracuse	W 102–53	20–6 (12–3)	Carrier Dome (801); Syracuse, NY
February 20, 2022; 2:00 p.m., ACCN	No. 23	at No. 3 Louisville	L 56–70	20–7 (12–4)	KFC Yum! Center (10,294); Louisville, KY
February 24, 2022; 6:00 p.m., ACCRSN	No. 23	Miami (FL)	W 70–63	21–7 (13–4)	Cassell Coliseum (1,522); Blacksburg, VA
February 27, 2022; 6:00 p.m., ACCN	No. 23	No. 3 NC State	L 66–68	21–8 (13–5)	Cassell Coliseum (3,702); Blacksburg, VA
ACC Women's Tournament
March 3, 2022; 11:00 a.m., ACCRSN	(5) No. 21	vs. (13) Clemson; Second Round	W 82–60	22–8	Greensboro Coliseum (5,648); Greensboro, NC
March 4, 2022; 2:00 p.m., ACCRSN	(5) No. 21	vs. (4) No. 16 North Carolina; Quarterfinals	W 87–80 ^{OT}	23–8	Greensboro Coliseum (5,682); Greensboro, NC
March 5, 2022; Noon, ACCN	(5) No. 21	vs. (1) No. 3 NC State; Semifinals	L 55–70	23–9	Greensboro Coliseum (7,923); Greensboro, NC
NCAA tournament
March 18, 2022; 2:30 p.m., ESPNU	(5 S) No. 16	vs. (12 S) No. 23 Florida Gulf Coast; First Round	L 81–84	23–10	Xfinity Center; College Park, MD
*Non-conference game. ^{#}Rankings from AP Poll. (#) Tournament seedings in parentheses. S=Spokane. All times are in Eastern.

== Rankings ==
Regular season polls
Poll	Pre- Season	Week 2	Week 3	Week 4	Week 5	Week 6	Week 7	Week 8	Week 9	Week 10	Week 11	Week 12	Week 13	Week 14	Week 15	Week 16	Week 17	Week 18	Final
AP	24	25	24	RV	RV				RV	RV	RV	RV	RV	RV	23	23	21	17	16
Coaches	RV	RV	RV	RV				RV		RV	RV	RV	RV	24	RV	24	23	23	25

Legend
	Increase in ranking
	Decrease in ranking
	Not ranked in previous week
(RV)	Received Votes
(NR)	Not Ranked

Coaches did not release a Week 2 poll and AP does not release a poll after the NCAA Tournament.

== See also ==
- 2021–22 Virginia Tech Hokies men's basketball team
