= 2021–22 North Carolina Tar Heels women's basketball team =

Intercollegiate basketball season

2021–22 North Carolina Tar Heels women's basketball

Goombay Splash Champions

NCAA tournament, Sweet Sixteen
- Conference: Atlantic Coast Conference

Ranking
- Coaches: No. 16
- AP: No. 17
- Record: 25–7 (13–5 ACC)
- Head coach: Courtney Banghart (3rd season)
- Assistant coaches: Joanne Aluka-White; Itoro Coleman; Adrian Walters
- Home arena: Carmichael Arena

2021–22 ACC women's basketball standings
	Conf.				Overall
Team	W		L	PCT	W		L	PCT
No. 3 NC State †	17	–	1	.944	32	–	4	.889
No. 4 Louisville	16	–	2	.889	29	–	5	.853
No. 17 North Carolina	13	–	5	.722	25	–	7	.781
No. 21 Notre Dame	13	–	5	.722	24	–	9	.727
No. 16 Virginia Tech	13	–	5	.722	23	–	10	.697
Georgia Tech	11	–	7	.611	21	–	11	.656
Boston College	10	–	8	.556	21	–	12	.636
Miami (FL)	10	–	8	.556	21	–	13	.618
Florida State	10	–	8	.556	17	–	14	.548
Duke	7	–	11	.389	17	–	13	.567
Wake Forest	4	–	14	.222	16	–	17	.485
Syracuse	4	–	14	.222	11	–	18	.379
Clemson	3	–	15	.167	10	–	21	.323
Pittsburgh	2	–	16	.111	11	–	19	.367
Virginia	2	–	16	.111	5	–	22	.185
† 2022 ACC tournament winner Rankings from AP poll

The 2021–22 North Carolina Tar Heels women's basketball team represented the University of North Carolina at Chapel Hill for the 2021–22 NCAA Division I women's basketball season. The Tar Heels were led by head coach Courtney Banghart, who was in her third season as head coach. She was assisted by Joanne Aluka-White, Adrian Walters, and former Clemson head coach Itoro Coleman. The Tar Heels played their home games at Carmichael Arena as members of the Atlantic Coast Conference.

The Tar Heels finished the season 25–7 overall and 13–5 in ACC play, to finish in a three-way tie for third place. As the fourth seed in the ACC tournament, they lost to fifth seed Virginia Tech in the quarterfinals. They earned an at-large bid to the NCAA tournament and were the fifth seed in the Greensboro Region. They defeated twelfth seed Stephen F. Austin in the first round and fourth seed Arizona in the second round, before falling to top seed South Carolina in the Sweet Sixteen to end their season.

== Previous season ==
For the 2020–21 season, the Tar Heels finished 13–11 and 8–9 in the ACC, finishing eighth in regular season play. They were the eight seed in the ACC tournament, where they lost to Wake Forest in the second round. The Tar Heels earned an at-large bid to the NCAA tournament that was held in San Antonio, TX. As the ten seed in the HemisFair Region, they faced seventh seeded Alabama, losing 80–71 in the first round of the tournament.

== Off-season ==
=== Departures ===
Departures
Name	Number	Pos.	Height	Year	Hometown	Reason for departure
Petra Holešínská	2	G	5'10"	Graduate student	Vracov, Czech Republic	Turned pro, signed with Chicago Sky
Kennady Tucker	4	G	5'10"	Junior	Little Rock, AR	Transferred to Oklahoma
Stephanie Watts	5	G	5'11"	Graduate student	Wesley Chapel, NC	Drafted by Los Angeles Sparks
Janelle Bailey	44	C	6'4"	Senior	Charlotte, NC	Graduated and signed with New York Liberty

=== Incoming transfers ===
Incoming transfers
Name	Number	Pos.	Height	Year	Hometown	Previous school
Carlie Littlefield	2	G	5'9"	Graduate student	Waukee, IA	Princeton
Eva Hodgson	10	G	5'11"	(redshirt) Junior	Rindge, NH	William & Mary

=== Recruiting class ===
College recruiting
Name	Hometown	School	Height	Weight	Commit date
Teonni Key; G/F	Cary, NC	Cary	6 ft 3 in (1.91 m)	N/A	
Teonni Key; G/F	Recruit ratings: ESPN: (97)				
Kayla McPherson; G	Hull, GA	Madison County	5 ft 7 in (1.70 m)	N/A	
Kayla McPherson; G	Recruit ratings: ESPN: (95)				
Morasha Wiggins; G	Kalamazoo, MI	Kalamazoo	6 ft 0 in (1.83 m)	N/A	
Morasha Wiggins; G	Recruit ratings: ESPN: (95)				
Destiny Adams; G/F	Whiting, NJ	Manchester Township	6 ft 0 in (1.83 m)	N/A	
Destiny Adams; G/F	Recruit ratings: ESPN: (95)				
Overall recruit ranking:
Note: In many cases, Scout, Rivals, 247Sports, On3, and ESPN may conflict in their listings of height and weight.; In these cases, the average was taken. ESPN grades are on a 100-point scale.; Sources:

== Roster ==
2021–22 North Carolina Tar Heels women's basketball team
Players
Coaches

Pos.	#	Name	Height	Year	Previous school	Hometown
F	0	Alexandria Zelaya	6 ft 4 in (1.93 m)	So	Millennium	Goodyear, AZ
G	1	Alyssa Ustby	6 ft 1 in (1.85 m)	So	Lourdes	Rochester, MN
G	2	Carlie Littlefield	5 ft 9 in (1.75 m)	GS	Waukee; Princeton	Waukee, IA
G	3	Kennedy Todd-Williams	5 ft 11 in (1.8 m)	So	Jacksonville	Jacksonville, NC
G	10	Eva Hodgson	5 ft 11 in (1.8 m)	RS Jr	New Hampton School; William & Mary	Rindge, NH
G	11	Ariel Young (injured)	6 ft 1 in (1.85 m)	RS Jr	Lincoln; Michigan	Tallahassee, FL
G/F	13	Teonni Key (injured) (redshirt)	6 ft 3 in (1.91 m)	Fr	Cary	Cary, NC
G	14	Kayla McPherson (injured) (redshirt)	5 ft 7 in (1.7 m)	Fr	Madison County	Hull, GA
G/F	20	Destiny Adams	6 ft 0 in (1.83 m)	Fr	Manchester Township	Whiting, NJ
F	21	Malu Tshitenge	6 ft 3 in (1.91 m)	Jr	St. John's College	Germantown, MD
F	24	Morasha Wiggins	6 ft 0 in (1.83 m)	Fr	Kalamazoo	Kalamazoo, MI
G	25	Deja Kelly	5 ft 8 in (1.73 m)	So	Duncanville	San Antonio, TX
F	30	Jaelynn Murray	6 ft 2 in (1.88 m)	RS Sr	Dreher	Columbia, SC
F	31	Anya Poole	6 ft 2 in (1.88 m)	So	Southeast Raleigh	Raleigh, NC

Head coach

- Courtney Banghart (Dartmouth)

Assistant coach(es)

- Joanne Aluka-White (Middle Tennessee)
- Adrian Walters (Saint Francis (PA))
- Itoro Coleman (Clemson)

Legend

- (C) Team captain
- (S) Suspended
- (I) Ineligible
- (W) Walk-on
- Injured
- Current redshirt

Roster
Last update: October 21, 2021

== Schedule and results ==
Date time, TV	Rank^{#}	Opponent^{#}	Result	Record	Site (attendance) city, state
Regular season
November 9, 2021*; 4:30 p.m., ACCNX		NC A&T	W 92–47	1–0	Carmichael Arena (2,133); Chapel Hill, NC
November 14, 2021*; 3:30 p.m., ESPN+		at Charlotte	W 89–33	2–0	Dale F. Halton Arena (2,621); Charlotte, NC
November 17, 2021*; 6:00 p.m., ACCNX		Appalachian State	W 89–44	3–0	Carmichael Arena (1,608); Chapel Hill, NC
November 21, 2021*; 4:30 p.m., ESPN+		at TCU; Maggie Dixon Classic	W 79–46	4–0	Schollmaier Arena (2,483); Fort Worth, TX
November 26, 2021*; 5:00 p.m., FloHoops		vs. VCU; Goombay Splash	W 72–59	5–0	Gateway Christian Academy (0); Bimini, Bahamas
November 27, 2021*; Noon, FloHoops		vs. Washington; Goombay Splash	W 58–37	6–0	Gateway Christian Academy (100); Bimini, Bahamas
December 1, 2021*; 9:00 p.m., BTN		at Minnesota; Big Ten/ACC Challenge	W 82–76	7–0	Williams Arena (3,432); Minneapolis, MN
December 5, 2021*; 2:00 p.m., ACCNX		James Madison	W 93–47	8–0	Carmichael Arena (1,456); Chapel Hill, NC
December 12, 2021*; 2:00 p.m., ACCNX		UNC Asheville	W 107–46	9–0	Carmichael Arena (1,417); Chapel Hill, NC
December 15, 2021*; 6:00 p.m., ACCNX	No. 25	Jacksonville	Canceled		Carmichael Arena; Chapel Hill, NC
December 19, 2021; 2:00 p.m., ACCNX	No. 25	at Boston College	W 76–73	10–0 (1–0)	Conte Forum (1,327); Chestnut Hill, MA
December 21, 2021*; 1:00 p.m., ACCNX	No. 25	Alabama State	W 83–47	11–0	Carmichael Arena (1,442); Chapel Hill, NC
December 30, 2021; 4:00 p.m., ACCN	No. 24	Syracuse	W 79–43	12–0 (2–0)	Carmichael Arena (1,625); Chapel Hill, NC
January 2, 2022; 6:00 p.m., ACCNX	No. 24	Clemson	W 81–62	13–0 (3–0)	Carmichael Arena (1,443); Chapel Hill, NC
January 6, 2022; 8:00 p.m., ACCN	No. 19	at No. 5 NC State; Rivalry	L 45–72	13–1 (3–1)	Reynolds Coliseum (5,500); Raleigh, NC
January 9, 2022; 6:00 p.m., ACCN	No. 19	Virginia Tech	W 71–46	14–1 (4–1)	Carmichael Arena (1,547); Chapel Hill, NC
January 16, 2022; 1:00 p.m., ACCRSN	No. 21	at No. 20 Notre Dame	L 65–70	14–2 (4–2)	Purcell Pavilion (5,905); South Bend, IN
January 20, 2022; 6:00 p.m., ACCNX	No. 20	Virginia	W 61–52	15–2 (5–2)	Carmichael Arena (1,513); Chapel Hill, NC
January 23, 2022; 12:00 p.m., ACCN	No. 20	at No. 18 Georgia Tech	L 38–55	15–3 (5–3)	McCamish Pavilion (2,357); Atlanta, GA
January 27, 2022; 7:00 p.m., ACCNX		at No. 21 Duke; Rivalry	W 78–62	16–3 (6–3)	Cameron Indoor Stadium (4,954); Durham, NC
January 30, 2022; 4:00 p.m., ESPN		No. 3 NC State; Rivalry	L 58–66	16–4 (6–4)	Carmichael Arena (4,136); Chapel Hill, NC
February 3, 2022; 8:00 p.m., ACCRSN	No. 24	at Wake Forest	W 78–59	17–4 (7–4)	LJVM Coliseum (1,916); Winston-Salem, NC
February 6, 2022; 12:00 p.m., ACCN	No. 24	Miami (Fl)	W 85–38	18–4 (8–4)	Carmichael Arena (2,759); Chapel Hill, NC
February 10, 2022; 6:00 p.m., ACCNX	No. 23	Pittsburgh	W 64–54	19–4 (9–4)	Carmichael Arena (1,479); Chapel Hill, NC
February 13, 2022; 1:00 p.m., ACCNX	No. 23	at Virginia Tech	L 61–66	19–5 (9–5)	Cassell Coliseum (1,964); Blacksburg, VA
February 17, 2022; 6:00 p.m., ACCRSN	No. 24	No. 3 Louisville	W 66–65	20–5 (10–5)	Carmichael Arena (2,115); Chapel Hill, NC
February 20, 2022; 12:00 p.m., ACCRSN	No. 24	at Florida State	W 64–49	21–5 (11–5)	Donald L. Tucker Civic Center (3,322); Tallahassee, FL
February 24, 2022; 7:00 p.m., ACCNX	No. 18	at Virginia	W 68–57	22–5 (12–5)	John Paul Jones Arena (1,879); Charlottesville, VA
February 27, 2022; 4:00 p.m., ACCN	No. 18	Duke; Rivalry	W 74–46	23–5 (13–5)	Carmichael Arena (5,230); Chapel Hill, NC
ACC tournament
March 4, 2022; 11:00 a.m., ACCRSN	(4) No. 16	vs. (5) No. 21 Virginia Tech; Quarterfinals	L 80–87 ^{OT}	23–6	Greensboro Coliseum (5,682); Greensboro, NC
NCAA Women's Tournament
March 19, 2022*; 7:30 p.m., ESPNEWS	(5 G) No. 17	vs. (12 G) Stephen F. Austin; First Round	W 79–66	24–6	McKale Center; Tucson, AZ
March 21, 2022*; 10:00 p.m., ESPN2	(5 G) No. 17	at (4 G) No. 19 Arizona; Second Round	W 63–45	25–6	McKale Center (8,333); Tucson, AZ
March 25, 2022*; 7:00 p.m., ESPN	(5 G) No. 17	vs. (1 G) No. 1 South Carolina; Sweet Sixteen	L 61–69	25–7	Greensboro Coliseum (8,811); Greensboro, NC
*Non-conference game. ^{#}Rankings from AP Poll. (#) Tournament seedings in parentheses. G=Greensboro. All times are in Eastern.

== Rankings ==
Regular season polls
Poll	Pre- season	Week 2	Week 3	Week 4	Week 5	Week 6	Week 7	Week 8	Week 9	Week 10	Week 11	Week 12	Week 13	Week 14	Week 15	Week 16	Week 17	Week 18	Final
AP				RV	RV	25	25	24	19	21	20	RV	24	23	24	18	16	18	17
Coaches	RV	RV	RV	24	20	20	18	15	18	20	22	23	22	23	18	17	18	18	16

Legend
	Increase in ranking
	Decrease in ranking
	Not ranked previous week
(RV)	Received votes

== See also ==
- 2021-22 North Carolina Tar Heels men's basketball team
