= 2021–22 Duke Blue Devils women's basketball team =

Intercollegiate basketball season

2021–22 Duke Blue Devils women's basketball
- Conference: Atlantic Coast Conference
- Record: 17–13 (7–11 ACC)
- Head coach: Kara Lawson (2nd season)
- Assistant coaches: Beth Cunningham; Winston Gandy; Tia Jackson
- Home arena: Cameron Indoor Stadium

2021–22 ACC women's basketball standings
	Conf.				Overall
Team	W		L	PCT	W		L	PCT
No. 3 NC State †	17	–	1	.944	32	–	4	.889
No. 4 Louisville	16	–	2	.889	29	–	5	.853
No. 17 North Carolina	13	–	5	.722	25	–	7	.781
No. 21 Notre Dame	13	–	5	.722	24	–	9	.727
No. 16 Virginia Tech	13	–	5	.722	23	–	10	.697
Georgia Tech	11	–	7	.611	21	–	11	.656
Boston College	10	–	8	.556	21	–	12	.636
Miami (FL)	10	–	8	.556	21	–	13	.618
Florida State	10	–	8	.556	17	–	14	.548
Duke	7	–	11	.389	17	–	13	.567
Wake Forest	4	–	14	.222	16	–	17	.485
Syracuse	4	–	14	.222	11	–	18	.379
Clemson	3	–	15	.167	10	–	21	.323
Pittsburgh	2	–	16	.111	11	–	19	.367
Virginia	2	–	16	.111	5	–	22	.185
† 2022 ACC tournament winner Rankings from AP poll

The 2021–22 Duke Blue Devils women's basketball team represented Duke University during the 2021–22 NCAA Division I women's basketball season. The Blue Devils were led by second year head coach Kara Lawson and played their home games at Cameron Indoor Stadium in Durham, North Carolina as members of the Atlantic Coast Conference.

The Blue Devils finished the season 17–13 overall and 7–11 in ACC play to finish in tenth place. As the tenth seed in the ACC tournament, they defeated Pittsburgh in the First Round before losing to seventh seed Miami in the Second Round. They were not invited to the NCAA tournament or the WNIT despite being ranked as high as No. 15 during the regular season.

== Previous season ==
On December 25, 2020, it was announced that the team would end their season due to COVID-19 concerns.

The Blue Devils finished the season 3–1, and 0–1 in ACC play. Due to their season cancellation they did not participate in the ACC tournament, NCAA tournament or WNIT.

== Off-season ==
=== Departures ===
Departures
Name	Number	Pos.	Height	Year	Hometown	Reason for departure
Jaida Patrick	0	G/F	5'10"	Sophomore	West Haverstraw, New York	Transferred to Columbia
Jada Claude	4	G/F	6'0"	Sophomore	Fayetteville, Georgia	Transferred to Morehead State
Sara Anastasieska	11	G	5'11"	Graduate Student	Sydney, Australia	Transferred to Illinois
Mikayla Boykin	12	G	5'9"	Senior	Clinton, North Carolina	Transferred to Charlotte
Uchenna Nwoke	13	C	6'6"	Junior	Grand Prairie, Texas	Left team
Jennifer Ezeh	22	F	6'3"	Sophomore	Nibo, Nigeria	Transferred to Missouri State
Jayda Adams	32	G	6'0"	Senior	Irvine, California	Transferred to Cal State Northridge

=== Incoming transfers ===
Incoming transfers
Name	Number	Pos.	Height	Year	Hometown	Previous school
Celeste Taylor	0	G	5'11"	Junior	Valley Stream, New York	Texas
Elizabeth Balogun	4	G/F	6'1"	Senior	Chattanooga, Tennessee	Louisville
Jordyn Oliver	11	G	5'10"	Junior	Prosper, Texas	Baylor
Amaya Finklea-Guity	22	C	6'4"	Graduate Student	Dorchester, Massachusetts	Syracuse
Imani Lewis	23	F	6'1"	Senior	Willingboro, New Jersey	Wisconsin
Nyah Green	31	G	6'1"	Junior	Allen, Texas	Louisville
Lexi Gordon	34	G/F	6'0"	Graduate Student	Fort Worth, Texas	Texas Tech
Emma Schmidt	45	G	5'9"	Graduate Student	Waukee, Iowa	TCU

=== Recruiting class ===
College recruiting
Name	Hometown	School	Height	Weight	Commit date
Shayeann Day-Wilson; G	Toronto, Canada	Crestwood Prep	5 ft 5 in (1.65 m)	N/A	
Shayeann Day-Wilson; G	Recruit ratings: ESPN: (93)				
Lee Volker; G	Purcellville, Virginia	St. Paul VI	5 ft 11 in (1.80 m)	N/A	
Lee Volker; G	Recruit ratings: No ratings found				
Overall recruit ranking:
Note: In many cases, Scout, Rivals, 247Sports, On3, and ESPN may conflict in their listings of height and weight.; In these cases, the average was taken. ESPN grades are on a 100-point scale.; Sources:

== Roster ==
2021–22 Duke Blue Devils women's basketball team
Players
Coaches

Pos.	#	Name	Height	Year	Previous school	Hometown
G	0	Celeste Taylor	5 ft 11 in (1.8 m)	Jr	Long Island Lutheran; Texas	Valley Stream, NY
G	2	Vanessa de Jesus	5 ft 8 in (1.73 m)	So	Sierra Canyon	Valencia, CA
G	3	Miela Goodchild	5 ft 10 in (1.78 m)	Sr	Moreton Bay College	Queensland, Australia
G/F	4	Elizabeth Balogun	6 ft 1 in (1.85 m)	Sr	Hamilton Heights Christian Academy; Georgia Tech; Louisville	Chattanooga, TN
G	11	Jordyn Oliver	5 ft 10 in (1.78 m)	Jr	Prosper; Baylor	Prosper, TX
G	13	Lee Volker	5 ft 11 in (1.8 m)	Fr	St. Paul VI	Purcellville, VA
C	22	Amaya Finklea–Guity	6 ft 4 in (1.93 m)	GS	Noble & Greenough; Syracuse	Dorchester, MA
F/C	23	Imani Lewis	6 ft 3 in (1.91 m)	Sr	Life Center Academy; Wisconsin	Willingboro, NJ
F/C	24	Onome Akinbode-James	6 ft 3 in (1.91 m)	Sr	Blair Academy	Blairstown, NJ
F/C	25	Jade Williams	6 ft 5 in (1.96 m)	GS	The Colony	The Colony, TX
G	30	Shayeann Day-Wilson	5 ft 6 in (1.68 m)	Fr	Crestwood Prep	Toronto, Canada
G	31	Nyah Green	6 ft 1 in (1.85 m)	Jr	Allen	Allen, TX
G	33	Jiselle Havas	5 ft 10 in (1.78 m)	Sr	Lake Highland Prep; Lafayette	Windermere, FL
G/F	34	Lexi Gordon	6 ft 0 in (1.83 m)	GS	L. D. Bell; Texas Tech	Fort Worth, TX
G	45	Emma Schmidt	5 ft 9 in (1.75 m)	GS	Waukee; TCU	Waukee, IA

Head coach

- Kara Lawson (Tennessee)

Assistant coach(es)

- Beth Cunningham (Notre Dame)
- Winston Gandy (Maryland)
- Tia Jackson (Iowa)

Legend

- (C) Team captain
- (S) Suspended
- (I) Ineligible
- (W) Walk-on
- Injured
- Current redshirt

Roster
Last update: October 22, 2021

== Schedule ==
Date time, TV	Rank^{#}	Opponent^{#}	Result	Record	Site (attendance) city, state
Exhibition
November 4, 2021*; 7:00 p.m.		Wingate	W 86–50	–	Cameron Indoor Stadium (0); Durham, NC
Regular season
November 9, 2021*; 7:00 p.m., ACCNX		Wintrhop	W 95–39	1–0	Cameron Indoor Stadium (2,473); Durham, NC
November 12, 2021*; 7:00 p.m., ESPN+		at Dayton	W 70–56	2–0	University of Dayton Arena (2,570); Dayton, OH
November 14, 2021* :00 p.m., ACCNX		UNC Wilmington	W 87–45	3–0	Cameron Indoor Stadium (2,649); Durham, NC
November 21, 2021*; 2:00 p.m., ESPN+		vs. Alabama; Maggie Dixon Classic	W 74–71	4–0	Schollmaier Arena (2,146); Fort Worth, TX
November 24, 2021*; 7:00 p.m., ACCNX		Appalachian State	W 73–65	5–0	Cameron Indoor Stadium (2,533); Durham, NC
November 28, 2021*; 2:00 p.m., ACCN		Troy	W 91–75	6–0	Cameron Indoor Stadium (2,516); Durham, NC
December 2, 2021*; 9:00 p.m., ESPN		No. 9 Iowa; ACC–Big Ten Women's Challenge	W 79–64	7–0	Cameron Indoor Stadium (3,064); Durham, NC
December 5, 2021*; 1:00 p.m., ESPN+		at Pennsylvania	W 77–55	8–0	The Palestra (450); Philadelphia, PA
December 15, 2021*; 7:00 p.m., ACCN	No. 15	No. 1 South Carolina	L 46–55	8–1	Cameron Indoor Stadium (5,451); Durham, NC
December 19, 2021; Noon, ACCN	No. 15	at Miami (FL)	Postponed due to COVID-19 issues		Watsco Center; Coral Gables, FL
December 21, 2021*; Noon, ESPN+	No. 16	at Charleston Southern	W 78–35	9–1	Buccaneer Field House (602); North Charleston, SC
December 30, 2021; 8:00 p.m., ACCN	No. 15	at Virginia Tech	L 55–77	9–2 (0–1)	Cassell Coliseum (1,664); Blacksburg, VA
January 2, 2022; 2:00 p.m., ACCN	No. 15	No. 17 Notre Dame	W 72–70	10–2 (1–1)	Cameron Indoor Stadium (3,354); Durham, NC
January 6, 2022; 2:00 p.m., ACCNX	No. 17	No. 16 Georgia Tech	Postponed due to COVID-19 issues		Cameron Indoor Stadium; Durham, NC
January 9, 2022; 2:00 p.m., ACCRSN	No. 17	at Syracuse	W 74–65	11–2 (2–1)	Carrier Dome (1,133); Syracuse, NY
January 13, 2022; 6:00 p.m., ACCN	No. 16	Virginia Tech	L 54–65	11–3 (2–2)	Cameron Indoor Stadium (2,209); Durham, NC
January 16, 2022; 4:00 p.m., ACCN	No. 16	at No. 4 NC State; Rivalry	L 60–84	11–4 (2–3)	Reynolds Coliseum (5,500); Raleigh, NC
January 18, 2022; 2:00 p.m., ACCN	No. 21	at Miami (FL); Rescheduled from Dec. 19, 2021	W 58–49	12–4 (3–3)	Watsco Center (1,443); Coral Gables, FL
January 23, 2022; 6:00 p.m., ACCN	No. 21	Virginia	W 57–48	13–4 (4–3)	Cameron Indoor Stadium (2,126); Durham, NC
January 27, 2022; 7:00 p.m., ACCNX	No. 21	North Carolina; Rivalry	L 62–78	13–5 (4–4)	Cameron Indoor Stadium (4,954); Durham, NC
January 30, 2022; 3:00 p.m., ESPN	No. 21	at No. 5 Louisville	L 65–77	13–6 (4–5)	KFC Yum! Center (9,001); Louisville, KY
February 1, 2022; 7:00 p.m., ACCNX		No. 12 Georgia Tech; Rescheduled from Jan. 6	L 46–59	13–7 (4–6)	Cameron Indoor Stadium (1,582); Durham, NC
February 3, 2022; 6:00 p.m., ACCNX		at Pittsburgh	W 54–39	14–7 (5–6)	Peterson Events Center (1,031); Pittsburgh, PA
February 6, 2022; 6:00 p.m., ACCN		Wake Forest	W 81–76	15–7 (6–6)	Cameron Indoor Stadium (2,487); Durham, NC
February 10, 2022; 6:00 p.m., ACCNX		Florida State	L 56–59	15–8 (6–7)	Cameron Indoor Stadium (2,327); Durham, NC
February 13, 2022; 2:00 p.m., ACCRSN		No. 5 NC State; Rivalry	L 62–77	15–9 (6–8)	Cameron Indoor Stadium (4,956); Durham, NC
February 17, 2022; 7:00 p.m., ACCNX		at Virginia	L 54–67	15–10 (6–9)	John Paul Jones Arena (1,695); Charlottesville, VA
February 20, 2022; 2:00 p.m., ACCNX		at Clemson	W 64–61	16–10 (7–9)	Littlejohn Coliseum (1,338); Clemson, SC
February 24, 2022; 8:00 p.m., ACCRSN		Boston College	L 51–67	16–11 (7–10)	Cameron Indoor Stadium (2,582); Durham, NC
February 27, 2022; 4:00 p.m., ACCN		at No. 18 North Carolina; Rivalry	L 46–74	16–12 (7–11)	Carmichael Arena (5,230); Chapel Hill, NC
ACC Women's Tournament
March 2, 2022; 3:30 p.m., ACCRSN	(10)	vs. (15) Pittsburgh; First Round	W 55–52	17–12	Greensboro Coliseum (3,619); Greensboro, NC
March 3, 2022; 6:00 p.m., ACCRSN	(10)	vs. (7) Miami (FL); Second Round	L 55–61	17–13	Greensboro Coliseum (5,648); Greensboro, NC
*Non-conference game. ^{#}Rankings from AP Poll,. (#) Tournament seedings in parentheses. All times are in Eastern Time.

== Rankings ==
2021–22 NCAA Division I women's basketball rankings

Regular season polls
Poll	Pre- Season	Week 2	Week 3	Week 4	Week 5	Week 6	Week 7	Week 8	Week 9	Week 10	Week 11	Week 12	Week 13	Week 14	Week 15	Week 16	Week 17	Week 18	Final
AP			RV	RV	19	15	16	15	17	16	21	21	RV	RV					
Coaches				RV	25	23	22	22	21	24	23	RV	RV						

Legend
	Increase in ranking
	Decrease in ranking
	Not ranked in previous week
(RV)	Received Votes
(NR)	Not Ranked

Coaches did not release a Week 2 poll and AP does not release a final poll.

== See also ==
- 2021–22 Duke Blue Devils men's basketball team
