= 2021–22 NC State Wolfpack women's basketball team =

Intercollegiate basketball season

2021–22 NC State Wolfpack women's basketball

ACC regular season and tournament champions

NCAA tournament, Elite Eight
- Conference: Atlantic Coast Conference

Ranking
- Coaches: No. 5
- AP: No. 3
- Record: 32–4 (17–1 ACC)
- Head coach: Wes Moore (9th season)
- Assistant coaches: Erin Batth; Nikki West; Brittany Morris
- Home arena: Reynolds Coliseum

2021–22 ACC women's basketball standings
	Conf.				Overall
Team	W		L	PCT	W		L	PCT
No. 3 NC State †	17	–	1	.944	32	–	4	.889
No. 4 Louisville	16	–	2	.889	29	–	5	.853
No. 17 North Carolina	13	–	5	.722	25	–	7	.781
No. 21 Notre Dame	13	–	5	.722	24	–	9	.727
No. 16 Virginia Tech	13	–	5	.722	23	–	10	.697
Georgia Tech	11	–	7	.611	21	–	11	.656
Boston College	10	–	8	.556	21	–	12	.636
Miami (FL)	10	–	8	.556	21	–	13	.618
Florida State	10	–	8	.556	17	–	14	.548
Duke	7	–	11	.389	17	–	13	.567
Wake Forest	4	–	14	.222	16	–	17	.485
Syracuse	4	–	14	.222	11	–	18	.379
Clemson	3	–	15	.167	10	–	21	.323
Pittsburgh	2	–	16	.111	11	–	19	.367
Virginia	2	–	16	.111	5	–	22	.185
† 2022 ACC tournament winner Rankings from AP poll

The 2021–22 NC State Wolfpack women's basketball team represented North Carolina State University during the 2021–22 NCAA Division I women's basketball season. The Wolfpack were led by ninth-year head coach Wes Moore, and played their home games at Reynolds Coliseum as members of the Atlantic Coast Conference.

The Wolfpack finished the season 32–4 overall and 17–1 in ACC play to finish as regular season champions. As the first seed in the ACC tournament, they earned a bye to the quarterfinals, where they defeated ninth-seed Florida State. Thhey defeated fifth-seed Virginia Tech in the semifinals, and they won the final versus seven-seed Miami to win their third straight tournament title. As champions, the Wolfpack earned the ACC's automatic bid to the NCAA tournament, where they were the first seed in the Bridgeport Region. They defeated sixteen-seed Longwood in the first round, ninth-seed Kansas State in the second round, and fifth-seed Notre Dame in the Sweet Sixteen before losing to second-seed UConn in the Elite Eight to end their season.

== Previous season ==
The Wolfpack finished the season 22–3 and 12–2 in ACC play to finish in second place. They won the ACC tournament, defeating Virginia Tech, Georgia Tech, and Louisville along the way to their title. It was NC State's sixth title in school history. As ACC Tournament Champions, they received an automatic bid to the NCAA tournament, where they were the one seed in the Mercado Regional. In the tournament, they defeated sixteen seed North Carolina A&T in the first round and eight seed South Florida, before losing to four seed Indiana in the Sweet Sixteen to end their season.

== Off-season ==
=== Departures ===
Departures
Name	Number	Pos.	Height	Year	Hometown	Reason for departure
Rebecca Demeke	0	G	6'0"	Freshman	Toronto, Canada	Transferred to Rhode Island
Elle Sutphin	20	F	6'3"	(redshirt) Freshman	Pilot Mountain, North Carolina	Transferred to Davidson
Dontavia Waggoner	24	G	6'0"	Freshman	Nashville, Tennessee	Transferred to Boston College
Jada Rice	31	F	6'4"	(redshirt) Sophomore	Suwanee, Georgia	Transferred to Alabama

=== Incoming transfers ===
Incoming transfers
Name	Number	Pos.	Height	Year	Hometown	Previous school
Diamond Johnson	0	G	5'5"	Sophomore	Philadelphia, Pennsylvania	Rutgers
Madison Hayes	21	G	6'0"	Sophomore	Chattanooga, Tennessee	Mississippi State

=== Recruiting class ===
College recruiting
Name	Hometown	School	Height	Weight	Commit date
Aziaha James; G	Virginia Beach, Virginia	Princess Anne	5 ft 9 in (1.75 m)	N/A	
Aziaha James; G	Recruit ratings: ESPN: (93)				
Sophia Hart; C	Farmington, Minnesota	Farmington	6 ft 5 in (1.96 m)	N/A	
Sophia Hart; C	Recruit ratings: ESPN: (91)				
Jessica Timmons; G	Charlotte, North Carolina	North Mecklenburg	5 ft 8 in (1.73 m)	N/A	
Jessica Timmons; G	Recruit ratings: ESPN: (90)				
Overall recruit ranking:
Note: In many cases, Scout, Rivals, 247Sports, On3, and ESPN may conflict in their listings of height and weight.; In these cases, the average was taken. ESPN grades are on a 100-point scale.; Sources:

== Roster ==
2021–22 NC State Wolfpack women's basketball team
Players
Coaches

Pos.	#	Name	Height	Year	Previous school	Hometown
G	0	Diamond Johnson	5 ft 5 in (1.65 m)	So	Neumann Goretti; Rutgers	Philadelphia, PA
G	1	Genesis Bryant	5 ft 6 in (1.68 m)	So	Lovejoy	Jonesboro, GA
G	2	Raina Perez	5 ft 4 in (1.63 m)	GS	Millennium; Cal State Fullerton	Goodyear, AZ
G	3	Kai Crutchfield	5 ft 9 in (1.75 m)	GS	Millbrook	Raleigh, NC
F	5	Jada Boyd	6 ft 2 in (1.88 m)	Jr	Appomattox County	Petersburg, VA
G	10	Aziaha James	5 ft 9 in (1.75 m)	Fr	Princess Anne	Virginia Beach, VA
G	11	Jakia Brown-Turner	6 ft 0 in (1.83 m)	Jr	Bishop McNamara	Temple Hills, MD
G	15	Kendal Moore	5 ft 6 in (1.68 m)	Jr	Pine Forest	Fayetteville, NC
G	21	Madison Hayes	6 ft 0 in (1.83 m)	So	East Hamilton; Mississippi State	Chattanooga, TN
G	23	Jessica Timmons	5 ft 8 in (1.73 m)	Fr	North Mecklenburg	Charlotte, NC
F	25	Kayla Jones	6 ft 1 in (1.85 m)	GS	Riverside	Jamesville, NC
C	32	Sophie Hart	6 ft 5 in (1.96 m)	Fr	Farmington	Farmington, MN
C	33	Elissa Cunane	6 ft 5 in (1.96 m)	Sr	Northern Guilford	Summerfield, NC
C	41	Camille Hobby	6 ft 1 in (1.85 m)	Jr	Nease	Jacksonville, FL

Head coach

- Wes Moore (Johnson)

Assistant coach(es)

- Erin Batth (Clemson)
- Nikki West (Clemson)
- Brittany Moris (Seton Hall)

Legend

- (C) Team captain
- (S) Suspended
- (I) Ineligible
- (W) Walk-on
- Injured
- Current redshirt

Roster
Last update: November 3, 2021

== Schedule ==
Date time, TV	Rank^{#}	Opponent^{#}	Result	Record	Site (attendance) city, state
Exhibition
November 3, 2021*; 7:00 p.m.	No. 5	UNC Pembroke	W 92–36	–	Reynolds Coliseum (0); Raleigh, NC
Regular season
November 9, 2021; 5:00 p.m., ESPN	No. 5	No. 1 South Carolina	L 57–66	0–1	Reynolds Coliseum (5,533); Raleigh, NC
November 12, 2021; 7:00 p.m., ACCNX	No. 5	Wofford; Preseason WNIT	W 90–57	1–1	Reynolds Coliseum (3,512); Raleigh, NC
November 14, 2021; 2:00 p.m., ACCN	No. 5	Florida; Preseason WNIT	W 85–52	2–1	Reynolds Coliseum (3,812); Raleigh, NC
November 15, 2021; 7:00 p.m., ACCNX	No. 5	Towson; Preseason WNIT	W 100–52	3–1	Reynolds Coliseum (3,361); Raleigh, NC
November 19, 2021; 7:00 p.m., ACCNX	No. 5	Kansas State; Preseason WNIT	W 90–69	4–1	Reynolds Coliseum (4,156); Raleigh, NC
November 25, 2021; 11:00 a.m., FloHoops	No. 5	vs. No. 2 Maryland; Baha Mar Hoops	W 78–60	5–1	Baha Mar Convention Center (0); Nassau, Bahamas
November 27, 2021; 6:00 p.m., FloHoops	No. 5	vs. Washington State; Baha Mar Hoops	W 62–34	6–1	Baha Mar Convention Center (0); Nassau, Bahamas
December 2, 2021; 7:00 p.m., ESPN2	No. 2т	at No. 6 Indiana; ACC–Big Ten Women's Challenge	W 66–58	7–1	Simon Skjodt Assembly Hall (5,242); Bloomington, IN
December 5, 2021; 2:00 p.m., ACCNX	No. 2т	Elon	W 78–46	8–1	Reynolds Coliseum (3,867); Raleigh, NC
December 10, 2021; 6:00 p.m., ACCN	No. 2	at Pittsburgh	W 89–54	9–1 (1–0)	Peterson Events Center (1,357); Pittsburgh, PA
December 12, 2021; 2:00 p.m., ACCNX	No. 2	St. Mary's	W 101–73	10–1	Reynolds Coliseum (3,652); Raleigh, NC
December 16, 2021; 6:00 p.m., ACCN	No. 2	No. 17 Georgia	L 80–82 ^{OT}	10–2	Reynolds Coliseum (4,012); Raleigh, NC
December 19, 2021; 4:00 p.m., ACCN	No. 2	Virginia	W 82–55	11–2 (2–0)	Reynolds Coliseum (4,564); Raleigh, NC
December 30, 2021; 7:00 p.m., ACCNX	No. 5	at Clemson	W 79–52	12–2 (3–0)	Littlejohn Coliseum (1,079); Clemson, SC
January 6, 2022; 8:00 p.m., ACCN	No. 5	No. 19 North Carolina	W 72–45	13–2 (4–0)	Reynolds Coliseum (5,500); Raleigh, NC
January 9, 2022; 2:00 p.m., ACCN	No. 5	at No. 20 Notre Dame	Postponed due to COVID-19 Issues		Purcell Pavilion; Notre Dame, IN
January 9, 2022; 2:00 p.m., ACCN	No. 5	at Miami (FL)	W 76–64	14–2 (5–0)	Watsco Center (1,873); Coral Gables, FL
January 13, 2022; 7:00 p.m., ACCNX	No. 4	at Virginia	W 66–43	15–2 (6–0)	John Paul Jones Arena (1,969); Charlottesville, VA
January 16, 2022; 4:00 p.m., ACCN	No. 4	No. 16 Duke	W 84–60	16–2 (7–0)	Reynolds Coliseum (5,500); Raleigh, NC
January 20, 2022; 7:30 p.m., ESPN	No. 4	No. 3 Louisville	W 68–59	17–2 (8–0)	Reynolds Coliseum (5,500); Raleigh, NC
January 23, 2022; 4:00 p.m., ACCN	No. 4	Virginia Tech	W 51–45	18–2 (9–0)	Reynolds Coliseum (5,500); Raleigh, NC
January 30, 2022; 4:00 p.m., ACCN	No. 3	at North Carolina	W 66–58	19–2 (10–0)	Carmichael Arena (4,136); Chapel Hill, NC
February 1, 2022; 7:00 p.m., ACCNX	No. 3	at No. 20 Notre Dame; Rescheduled from Jan. 9	L 66–69	19–3 (10–1)	Purcell Pavilion (5,566); Notre Dame, IN
February 3, 2022; 6:00 p.m., ACCN	No. 3	Florida State	W 68–48	20–3 (11–1)	Reynolds Coliseum (4,122); Raleigh, NC
February 7, 2022; 6:00 p.m., ESPN2	No. 5	No. 11 Georgia Tech	W 59–48	21–3 (12–1)	Reynolds Coliseum (5,500); Raleigh, NC
February 10, 2022; 6:00 p.m., ACCN	No. 5	at Boston College	W 85–78 ^{OT}	22–3 (13–1)	Conte Forum (2,547); Chestnut Hill, MA
February 13, 2022; 2:00 p.m., ACCRSN	No. 5	at Duke	W 77–62	23–3 (14–1)	Cameron Indoor Stadium (4,956); Durham, NC
February 17, 2022; 8:00 p.m., ACCRSN	No. 4	Wake Forest	W 92–61	24–3 (15–1)	Reynolds Coliseum (5,500); Raleigh, NC
February 20, 2022; 2:00 p.m., ACCRSN	No. 4	Syracuse	W 95–53	25–3 (16–1)	Reynolds Coliseum (5,500); Raleigh, NC
February 27, 2022; 6:00 p.m., ACCN	No. 3	at No. 23 Virginia Tech	W 68–66	26–3 (17–1)	Cassell Coliseum (3,702); Blacksburg, VA
ACC tournament
March 4, 2022; 2:00 p.m., ACCRSN	(1) No. 3	vs. (9) Florida State; Quarterfinals	W 84–54	27–3	Greensboro Coliseum (5,682); Greensboro, NC
March 4, 2022; Noon, ACCN	(1) No. 3	vs. (5) No. 21 Virginia Tech; Semifinals	W 70–55	28–3	Greensboro Coliseum (7,923); Greensboro, NC
March 5, 2022; Noon, ESPN	(1) No. 3	vs. (7) Miami (FL); Final	W 60–47	29–3	Greensboro Coliseum (9,253); Greensboro, NC
NCAA tournament
March 19, 2022; 2:00 p.m., ESPN	(1 B) No. 3	(16 B) Longwood; First Round	W 96–68	30–3	Reynolds Coliseum (5,483); Raleigh, NC
March 21, 2022; 4:00 p.m., ESPN	(1 B) No. 3	(9 B) Kansas State; Second Round	W 89–57	31–3	Reynolds Coliseum (4,808); Raleigh, NC
March 26, 2022; 11:30 a.m., ESPN	(1 B) No. 3	vs. (5 B) No. 21 Notre Dame; Sweet Sixteen	W 66–63	32–3	Total Mortgage Arena; Bridgeport, CT
March 28, 2022; 7:00 p.m., ESPN	(1 B) No. 3	vs. (2 B) No. 5 UConn; Elite Eight	L 87–91 ^{2OT}	32–4	Total Mortgage Arena (10,119); Bridgeport, CT
*Non-conference game. ^{#}Rankings from AP Poll. (#) Tournament seedings in parentheses. B=Bridgeport. All times are in Eastern.

== Rankings ==
Regular season polls
Poll	Pre- Season	Week 2	Week 3	Week 4	Week 5	Week 6	Week 7	Week 8	Week 9	Week 10	Week 11	Week 12	Week 13	Week 14	Week 15	Week 16	Week 17	Week 18	Final
AP	5	5	5	2т	2	2	5	5	5	4	4	3 (1)	3 (1)	5	4	3	3	3 (2)	3 (1)
Coaches	4	4	3	3	2	4	4	4	4	4	3	3	5	4	3	3	3 (1)	3	5

Legend
	Increase in ranking
	Decrease in ranking
	Not ranked previous week
(RV)	Received votes
т	Tied with team above or below also with this symbol.

Coaches did not release a Week 2 poll and AP does not release a final poll.
