= Jakia Brown-Turner =

American basketball player (born 2001)

Personal information
- Born: February 11, 2001 (age 25) Oxon Hill, Maryland, U.S.
- Listed height: 6 ft 0 in (1.83 m)

Career information
- High school: Bishop McNamara (Forestville, Maryland)
- College: NC State (2019–2023); Maryland (2023–2024)
- WNBA draft: 2024: undrafted
- Playing career: 2024–present
- Position: Guard

Career history
- 2024: Washington Mystics

Career highlights
- First-team All-ACC (2021); McDonald's All-American (2019)
- Stats at Basketball Reference
Medals
Women's basketball
Representing United States
FIBA AmeriCup
Gold medal – first place	2021 Puerto Rico	Team

Jakia Brown-Turner (born February 11, 2001) is an American professional basketball player who most recently played for the Washington Mystics of the Women's National Basketball Association (WNBA). She played college basketball for the NC State Wolfpack and Maryland Terrapins.

== Early life ==
Brown-Turner was born on February 11, 2001, in Oxon Hill, Maryland. She attended Bishop McNamara High School and was a top player for the basketball team, being a three-time first-team all-conference choice and being ranked ESPN's No. 15 prospect nationally. As a junior, she helped the school to a record of 21–7 while being named first team All-Met by The Washington Post.

As a senior, Brown-Turner helped Bishop McNamara rank top ten nationally, leading them to the Washington Catholic Athletic Conference championship with a record of 31–4. She averaged 16.0 points and 7.3 rebounds per game, receiving a number of honors including selection to the McDonald's All-American Game and Jordan Brand Classic, All-County and Naismith third-team All-America honors, and Maryland Girls' Basketball Player of the Year, Bishop McNamara female student-athlete of the year and Gatorade Maryland Player of the Year honors. She ended as Bishop McNamara's all-time leading scorer and committed to play college basketball for the NC State Wolfpack.

== College career ==
Brown-Turner played all 32 games, 31 as a starter, for NC State in the 2019–20 season, averaging 9.4 points and 3.6 rebounds while being selected to the Atlantic Coast Conference (ACC) All-Freshman team. She averaged 13.5 points and 5.0 rebounds during her sophomore season, 2020–21, earning first-team All-ACC honors and being selected honorable mention All-American by the Associated Press. In the 2021–22 season, she averaged 9.8 points and 4.6 rebounds and was chosen second-team All-ACC Tournament. From 2020 to 2022, Brown-Turner helped NC State win the ACC title each year, also reaching the Sweet Sixteen of the NCAA Tournament in 2021 and the Elite Eight in 2022. In her senior year for the Wolfpack, she averaged 9.1 points and 3.9 rebounds while helping them reach the NCAA Tournament. She transferred to the Maryland Terrapins for a final season in 2023. In her career at NC State, she started 123 of 124 games, scoring 1,273 points while ranking 11th in team history for 3-point shots made, with 159.

Brown-Turner became a team captain with the Terrapins and started 32 games in her lone season there, averaging 13.5 points and 6.4 rebounds. She led the team in rebounds and scored double figures in 23 games, being chosen second-team All-Big Ten Conference at the end of the season. She totaled 1,706 points, 731 rebounds and 302 assists in her collegiate career.

== Professional career ==
After going unselected in the 2024 WNBA draft, Brown-Turner signed a training camp contract with the Washington Mystics on April 17, 2024. She was waived on May 7. She signed a rest-of-season hardship contract on June 28, was waived on July 2 without appearing in any games, and then signed a seven-day contract with the team on July 4. She made her WNBA debut on July 4 against the Las Vegas Aces, scoring two points.

== International career ==
Brown-Turner played for the United States national team at the 2021 FIBA Women's AmeriCup, averaging 3.8 points and 3.0 rebounds while helping the U.S. compile an undefeated 6–0 record, winning the tournament.

== Career statistics ==
Legend
GP	Games played	GS	Games started	MPG	Minutes per game	RPG	Rebounds per game
APG	Assists per game	SPG	Steals per game	BPG	Blocks per game	PPG	Points per game
TO	Turnovers per game	FG%	Field-goal percentage	3P%	3-point field-goal percentage	FT%	Free-throw percentage
**Bold**	Career best	°	League leader

=== WNBA ===
==== Regular season ====
Stats current through end of 2024 season

WNBA regular season statistics
Year	Team	GP	GS	MPG	FG%	3P%	FT%	RPG	APG	SPG	BPG	TO	PPG
2024	Washington	2	0	4.0	.500	—	1.000	0.5	0.0	0.5	0.0	0.0	1.0
**Career**	1 year, 1 team	2	0	4.0	.500	—	1.000	0.5	0.0	0.5	0.0	0.0	1.0

=== College ===
NCAA statistics
Year	Team	GP	GS	MPG	FG%	3P%	FT%	RPG	APG	SPG	BPG	TO	PPG
2019–20	NC State	32	31	28.6	.422	.368	.625	3.6	1.7	**0.9**	**0.3**	1.7	9.4
2020–21	NC State	25	25	30.4	.442	.370	.731	5.0	**2.4**	0.6	0.2	**1.6**	**13.5**
2021–22	NC State	**35**	**35**	28.1	**.444**	**.520**	.339	4.6	2.1	0.8	**0.3**	**1.6**	9.8
2022–23	NC State	32	32	27.8	.367	.301	**.787**	3.9	1.8	0.8	**0.3**	2.0	9.1
2023–24	Maryland	32	32	**30.8**	.441	.316	.758	**6.4**	1.8	**0.9**	0.3	2.0	**13.5**
**Career**		156	155	29.1	.425	.340	.729	4.7	1.9	0.8	0.3	1.8	10.9
