= 2021–22 NCAA Division I women's basketball rankings =

- Season: 2021–22
- NCAA Tournament: 2022
- Preseason No. 1: South Carolina
- NCAA Tournament Champions: South Carolina
NCAA Division I women's basketball rankings


Two human polls make up the 2021–22 NCAA Division I women's basketball rankings, the AP Poll and the Coaches Poll, in addition to various publications' preseason polls.

== Legend ==
	Increase in ranking
	Decrease in ranking
	Not ranked previous week
Italics	Number of first place votes
(#–#)	Win–loss record
т	Tied with team above or below also with this symbol

== AP Poll ==
	Preseason Oct 19	Week 2 Nov 15	Week 3 Nov 23	Week 4 Nov 30	Week 5 Dec 6	Week 6 Dec 13	Week 7 Dec 20	Week 8 Dec 27	Week 9 Jan 3	Week 10 Jan 10	Week 11 Jan 17	Week 12 Jan 24	Week 13 Jan 31	Week 14 Feb 7	Week 15 Feb 14	Week 16 Feb 21	Week 17 Feb 28	Week 18 Mar 7	Final Mar 14	
1.	South Carolina (14)	South Carolina (2–0) (25)	South Carolina (6–0) (30)	South Carolina (7–0) (30)	South Carolina (9–0) (30)	South Carolina (10–0) (30)	South Carolina (11–0) (29)	South Carolina (12–0) (30)	South Carolina (13–1) (22)	South Carolina (15–1) (26)	South Carolina (17–1) (28)	South Carolina (17–1) (29)	South Carolina (20–1) (29)	South Carolina (21–1) (30)	South Carolina (23–1) (30)	South Carolina (25–1) (30)	South Carolina (27–1) (30)	South Carolina (29–2) (17)	South Carolina (29–2) (20)	1.
2.	UConn (10)	UConn (1–0) (5)	Maryland (6–0)	NC State (6–1)т	NC State (8–1)	NC State (10–1)	Stanford (8–2)	Stanford (8–3)	Stanford (9–3)	Stanford (11–3)	Stanford (13–3)	Stanford (14–3)	Stanford (16–3)	Stanford (18–3)	Stanford (21–3)	Stanford (23–3)	Stanford (25–3)	Stanford (28–3) (11)	Stanford (28–3) (9)	2.
3.	Stanford (5)	Maryland (3–0)	UConn (3–1)	UConn (3–1)т	UConn (5–1)	Stanford (6–2)	Louisville (10–1)	Louisville (10–1)	Louisville (12–1) (5)	Louisville (13–1) (4)	Louisville (15–1) (2)	NC State (18–2) (1)	NC State (19–2)	Louisville (21–2)	Louisville (22–2)	NC State (25–3)	NC State (26–3)	NC State (29–3) (2)	NC State (29–3) (1)	3.
4.	Maryland	Indiana (2–0)	Indiana (4–0)	Stanford (5–2)	Stanford (5–2)	Arizona (9–0)	Arizona (10–0)	Arizona (10–0)	Arizona (10–0) (3)	NC State (14–2)	NC State (16–2)	Tennessee (18–1)	Louisville (18–2)	Michigan (20–2)	NC State (23–3)	Louisville (23–3)	Louisville (25–3)	Baylor (25–5)	Louisville (25–4)	4.
5.	NC State	NC State (2–1)	NC State (4–1)	Baylor (6–1)	Baylor (8–1)	Baylor (9–1)	NC State (11–2)	NC State (11–2)	NC State (12–2)	Tennessee (15–1)	Tennessee (17–1)	Louisville (16–2)	Indiana (14–2)	NC State (20–3)	Indiana (18–3)	Baylor (21–5)	Baylor (23–5)	Louisville (25–4)	UConn (25–5)	5.
6.	Louisville	Baylor (2–0)	Baylor (3–1)	Indiana (5–1)	Arizona (7–0)	Louisville (8–1)	Maryland (9–3)	Maryland (10–3)	Indiana (11–2)	Indiana (12–2)	Indiana (14–2)	Indiana (14–2)	Michigan (18–2)	Arizona (17–3)	Iowa State (21–3)	Michigan (21–4)	LSU (25–4)	UConn (24–5)	Texas (26–6)	6.
7.	Baylor	Stanford (1–1)	Stanford (3–1)	Arizona (7–0)	Louisville (7–1)	UConn (6–2)т	Tennessee (9–1)	Tennessee (10–1)	Tennessee (13–1)	Arizona (11–1)	Iowa State (16–1)	Michigan (16–2)	Tennessee (18–2)	Indiana (16–3)	Baylor (19–5)	UConn (19–5)	UConn (22–5)	Texas (23–6)	Baylor (27–6)	7.
8.	Indiana	Iowa (3–0)	Iowa (4–0)	Maryland (6–2)	Maryland (8–2)	Tennessee (9–0)т	Indiana (9–2)	Indiana (10–2)	Michigan (12–1)	Maryland (12–4)	Michigan (15–2)	Arizona (14–2)	Arizona (15–3)	UConn (15–4)	Arizona (18–4)	LSU (23–4)	Iowa State (24–4)	Iowa (23–7)	Iowa (23–7)	8.
9.	Iowa	Oregon (2–0)	Arizona (4–0)	Iowa (4–0)	Tennessee (8–0)	Maryland (9–3)	Michigan (11–1)	Michigan (11–1)	Texas (10–1)	Iowa State (14–1)	UConn (9–3)	Texas (14–3)	Baylor (15–4)	Iowa State (20–3)	Michigan (20–4)	Iowa State (22–4)	Texas (21–6)	LSU (25–5)	LSU (25–5)	9.
10.	Oregon	Louisville (0–1)	Louisville (3–1)	Louisville (5–1)	Indiana (5–2)	Indiana (8–2)	Baylor (9–2)	Baylor (9–2)	Maryland (10–4)	UConn (7–3)	Arizona (12–2)	UConn (11–4)	UConn (13–4)	Baylor (17–5)	UConn (17–5)	Indiana (19–5)	Michigan (22–5)	Iowa State (25–5)	Iowa State (26–6)	10.
11.	Michigan	Arizona (2–0)	Tennessee (4–0)	Tennessee (6–0)	Texas (6–1)	Texas (7–1)	UConn (6–3)	UConn (6–3)	UConn (6–3)	Michigan (13–2)	LSU (17–2)	Baylor (13–4)	Iowa State (18–3)	Georgia Tech (18–4)	LSU (21–4)	Texas (19–6)	Maryland (21–7)	Indiana (22–8)	Indiana (22–8)	11.
12.	Iowa State	Texas (2–0)	Michigan (5–0)	Michigan (7–0)	Iowa (5–1)	Iowa State (10–1)	Texas (8–1)	Texas (9–1)	Iowa State (12–1)	LSU (15–2)	Maryland (12–5)	LSU (17–3)	Georgia Tech (17–4)	Oklahoma (20–3)	Tennessee (21–4)	Arizona (19–5)	Iowa (20–7)	Michigan (22–6)	Michigan (22–6)	12.
13.	Kentucky	Michigan (2–0)	Iowa State (4–0)	South Florida (5–2)	Michigan (8–1)	Michigan (10–1)	Georgia (10–1)т	Georgia (11–1)	LSU (14–1)	Texas (11–2)	Georgia (13–3)	Iowa State (16–3)	Texas (15–4)	Tennessee (19–4)	Maryland (18–6)	Maryland (20–7)	Ohio State (22–5)	Maryland (21–8)	Maryland (21–8)	13.
14.	Oregon State	Iowa State (1–0)	Texas (3–1)	Iowa State (7–0)	Kentucky (6–1)	Iowa (5–2)	Iowa State (11–1)т	Iowa State (11–1)	Baylor (10–3)	Baylor (10–3)	Oklahoma (15–2)	Georgia Tech (15–4)	Georgia (16–4)	LSU (18–4)	Texas (17–6)	Notre Dame (20–6)	Indiana (19–7)т	Ohio State (23–6)	Ohio State (23–6)	14.
15.	Tennessee	Oregon State (1–0)	Oregon (3–2)	Texas (4–1)	Iowa State (8–1)	Duke (8–0)	Iowa (6–2)	Duke (9–1)	Georgia (12–2)	Georgia Tech (11–3)	Baylor (11–4)т	Georgia (15–4)	LSU (18–4)	Maryland (17–6)	Oklahoma (20–4)	Florida (20–7)	Arizona (20–6)т	BYU (25–2)	Kentucky (19–11)	15.
16.	Florida State	Tennessee (2–0)	Oregon State (3–0)	Kentucky (4–1)	BYU (8–0)	South Florida (6–3)	Duke (9–1)	Georgia Tech (10–2)	Georgia Tech (10–3)	Duke (11–2)	Texas (12–3)т	BYU (15–1)	BYU (18–1)	Texas (15–6)	Georgia Tech (19–6)	Tennessee (21–6)	North Carolina (23–5)	Kentucky (19–11)	Virginia Tech (23–9)	16.
17.	Ohio Stateт	Florida State (2–0)	Florida State (4–0)	Texas A&M (7–0)	South Florida (5–3)	Georgia (8–1)	Georgia Tech (9–2)	Notre Dame (11–2)	Duke (10–2)	Georgia (13–3)	BYU (14–1)	Maryland (13–6)	Maryland (15–6)	Georgia (17–5)	Florida (18–6)	Ohio State (20–5)	BYU (25–2)	Virginia Tech (23–9)	North Carolina (23–6)	17.
18.	Georgia Techт	Georgia Tech (3–0)	South Florida (4–2)	Ohio State (5–0)т	Texas A&M (8–1)	Georgia Tech (8–2)	South Florida (8–3)	BYU (10–1)	BYU (10–1)	BYU (12–1)	Georgia Tech (13–4)	Oklahoma (16–3)	Oklahoma (18–3)	Notre Dame (18–5)	Ohio State (18–4)	North Carolina (21–5)	Tennessee (22–7)	North Carolina (23–6)	Tennessee (23–8)	18.
19.	West Virginia	Kentucky (2–1)	UCLA (3–0)	Oregon (3–2)т	Duke (8–0)	Kentucky (6–3)	BYU (9–1)	LSU (11–1)	North Carolina (13–0)	Kentucky (8–4)	Notre Dame (13–3)	Oregon (11–5)	Oregon (14–5)	Florida (17–6)	Notre Dame (19–6)	BYU (23–2)	Oklahoma (22–6)	Tennessee (23–8)	Arizona (20–7)	19.
20.	UCLA	UCLA (1–0)	Kentucky (3–1)	Georgia (6–0)	Ohio State (6–1)	BYU (8–1)	Notre Dame (10–2)	Kentucky (7–3)	Notre Dame (11–3)	Notre Dame (11–3)	North Carolina (14–2)	Notre Dame (14–4)	Notre Dame (16–4)	BYU (19–2)	BYU (21–2)	Oklahoma (20–6)	Notre Dame (21–7)	Arizona (20–7)	BYU (26–3)	20.
21.	South Florida	Ohio State (2–0)	Ohio State (3–0)	BYU (7–0)	Georgia (7–1)	Notre Dame (9–2)	LSU (9–1)	Iowa (6–3)	Kentucky (7–3)	North Carolina (14–1)	Duke (11–4)	Duke (13–4)	Iowa (14–4)	Ohio State (16–4)	Georgia (17–7)	Iowa (17–7)	Virginia Tech (21–8)	Oklahoma (23–7)	Notre Dame (22–8)	21.
22.	Arizona	West Virginia (0–0)	West Virginia (3–0)	Florida Gulf Coast (7–0)	Notre Dame (7–2)	LSU (7–1)	Kentucky (7–3)	South Florida (9–4)	Iowa (7–3)	Colorado (13–0)	Colorado (13–1)	Ohio State (15–3)	Florida Gulf Coast (19–1)	Florida Gulf Coast (21–1)	Iowa (16–6)	Georgia Tech (19–8)	Florida Gulf Coast (26–2)	Notre Dame (22–8)	Oklahoma (24–8)	22.
23.	Texas A&M	South Florida (2–0)	Texas A&M (4–0)	Oregon State (3–2)	Oregon State (4–2)	Texas A&M (9–2)	Texas A&M (9–2)	Texas A&M (10–2)	Oklahoma (12–1)	Oklahoma (13–2)	Kentucky (8–5)	Iowa (12–4)	Ohio State (15–4)	North Carolina (18–4)	Virginia Tech (19–6)	Virginia Tech (20–7)	Florida (20–9)	Florida Gulf Coast (27–2)	Florida Gulf Coast (29–2)	23.
24.	Virginia Tech	Texas A&M (2–0)	Virginia Tech (5–0)	Notre Dame (6–1)	LSU (6–1)	Ohio State (7–2)	Ohio State (8–2)	North Carolina (11–0)	South Florida (10–4)	South Florida (11–4)	Florida Gulf Coast (15–1)	Ole Miss (17–2)	North Carolina (16–4)	Oregon (14–7)	North Carolina (19–5)	Florida Gulf Coast (24–2)	Georgia (20–8)	Princeton (22–4)	UCF (25–3)	24.
25.	Texas	Virginia Tech (3–0)	Florida Gulf Coast (5–0)	Florida State (4–2)	Colorado (8–0)	North Carolina (9–0)	North Carolina (10–0)	Ohio State (9–2)	Texas A&M (10–3)	Kansas State (13–2)	Iowa (10–4)	Kansas State (15–4)	Kansas State (16–5)	Iowa (15–6)	Florida Gulf Coast (22–2)	Georgia (18–8)т Oregon (18–9)т	Georgia Tech (20–9)	UCF (22–3)	Princeton (24–4)	25.
	Preseason Oct 19	Week 2 Nov 15	Week 3 Nov 23	Week 4 Nov 30	Week 5 Dec 6	Week 6 Dec 13	Week 7 Dec 20	Week 8 Dec 27	Week 9 Jan 3	Week 10 Jan 10	Week 11 Jan 17	Week 12 Jan 24	Week 13 Jan 31	Week 14 Feb 7	Week 15 Feb 14	Week 16 Feb 21	Week 17 Feb 28	Week 18 Mar 7	Final Mar 14	
		None	Dropped: No. 18 Georgia Tech	Dropped: No. 19 UCLA; No. 22 West Virginia; No. 24 Virginia Tech	Dropped: No. 18т Oregon; No. 22 Florida Gulf Coast; No. 25 Florida State	Dropped: No. 23 Oregon State; No. 25 Colorado	Dropped: None	Dropped: None	Dropped: No. 25 Ohio State	Dropped: No. 22 Iowa; No. 25 Texas A&M	Dropped: No. 24 South Florida; No. 25 Kansas State	Dropped: No. 20 North Carolina; No. 22 Colorado; No. 23 Kentucky; No. 24 Florida Gulf Coast	Dropped: No. 21 Duke; No. 24 Ole Miss	Dropped: No. 25 Kansas State	Dropped: No. 24 Oregon	Dropped: None	Dropped: No. 25т Oregon	Dropped: No. 23 Florida; No. 24 Georgia; No. 25 Georgia Tech	Dropped: None	

== USA Today Coaches Poll ==
The Coaches Poll is the second oldest poll still in use after the AP Poll. It is compiled by a rotating group of 31 college Division I head coaches. The Poll operates by Borda count. Each voting member ranks teams from 1 to 25. Each team then receives points for their ranking in reverse order: Number 1 earns 25 points, number 2 earns 24 points, and so forth. The points are then combined and the team with the highest points is then ranked No. 1; second highest is ranked No. 2 and so forth. Only the top 25 teams with points are ranked, with teams receiving first place votes noted the quantity next to their name. The maximum points a single team can earn is 775.

	Preseason Nov 3	Week 2 Nov 23	Week 3 Nov 30	Week 4 Dec 7	Week 5 Dec 14	Week 6 Dec 21	Week 7 Dec 28	Week 8 Jan 4	Week 9 Jan 11	Week 10 Jan 18	Week 11 Jan 25	Week 12 Feb 1	Week 13 Feb 8	Week 14 Feb 15	Week 15 Feb 22	Week 16 Mar 1	Week 17 Mar 8	Week 18 Mar 14	Final Apr 4	
1.	South Carolina (13)	South Carolina (6–0) (31)	South Carolina (8–0) (32)	South Carolina (9–0) (32)	South Carolina (10–0) (32)	South Carolina (11–0) (31)	South Carolina (12–0) (32)	South Carolina (13–1) (16)	South Carolina (15–1) (24)	South Carolina (17–1) (26)	South Carolina (18–1) (31)	South Carolina (20–1) (31)	South Carolina (21–1) (31)	South Carolina (23–1) (31)	South Carolina (25–1) (31)	South Carolina (27–1) (31)	South Carolina (29–2) (19)	South Carolina (29–2)	South Carolina (35–2) (30)	1.
2.	Stanford (13)	UConn (3–1)	UConn (3–1)	UConn (5–1)	NC State (10–1)	Stanford (8–2)	Louisville (10–1)	Louisville (12–1) (14)	Louisville (13–1) (7)	Louisville (15–1) (6)	Stanford (14–3) (1)	Stanford (16–3) (1)	Stanford (18–3) (1)	Stanford (21–3) (1)	Stanford (23–3) (1)	Stanford (25–3) (1)	Stanford (28–3) (12)	Stanford (28–3)	UConn (30–6)	2.
3.	UConn (6)	Maryland (6–0)	NC State (6–1)	NC State (8–1)	Stanford (6–2)	Louisville (10–1)	Stanford (8–3)	Stanford (9–3) (1)	Stanford (11–3) (1)	Stanford (13–3)	NC State (18–2)	NC State (19–2)	Louisville (21–2)	Louisville (23–2)	NC State (25–3)	NC State (26–3)	NC State (29–3) (1)	NC State (29–3)	Stanford (32–4)	3.
4.	NC State	NC State (4–1)	Stanford (5–2)	Stanford (5–2)	Louisville (8–1)	NC State (11–2)	NC State (11–2)	NC State (12–2)	NC State (14–2)	NC State (16–2)	Louisville (16–2)	Louisville (18–2)	Michigan (20–2)	NC State (23–3)	Louisville (24–3)	Louisville (26–3)	Baylor (25–5)	Louisville (26–4)	Louisville (30–5)	4.
5.	Maryland	Stanford (3–1)	Louisville (5–1)	Louisville (7–1)	Baylor (9–1)	Arizona (10–0)	Arizona (10–0)	Arizona (10–0) (1)	Indiana (12–2)	Indiana (14–2)	Tennessee (18–1)	Michigan (19–2)	NC State (21–3)	Iowa State (21–3)	Michigan (21–4)	Baylor (24–5)	Louisville (26–4)	Baylor (27–6)	NC State (32–4)	5.
6.	Louisville	Indiana (4–0)	Indiana (5–1)	Baylor (8–1)	UConn (6–2)	Indiana (9–2)	Indiana (10–2)	Indiana (11–2)	Tennessee (15–1)	Tennessee (17–1)	Indiana (14–2)	Indiana (14–3)	Indiana (16–3)	Indiana (18–4)	Iowa State (22–4)	LSU (25–4)	UConn (25–5)	UConn (25–5)	Texas (29–7)	6.
7.	Indiana	Louisville (3–1)	Baylor (6–1)	Maryland (8–2)	Indiana (8–2)	Michigan (11–1)	Michigan (11–1)	Michigan (12–1)	Arizona (11–1)	Iowa State (16–1)	Michigan (17–2)	Tennessee (19–2)	Arizona (17–3)	Arizona (18–4)	Baylor (21–5)	Iowa State (24–5)	Iowa State (25–5)	Texas (26–6)	Michigan (25–7)	7.
8.	Baylor	Baylor (3–1)	Maryland (6–2)	Indiana (6–2)	Arizona (9–0)	Maryland (9–3)	Maryland (10–3)	Tennessee (13–1)	Maryland (12–4)	Michigan (15–2)	Arizona (14–2)	Arizona (15–3)	UConn (15–4)	Tennessee (21–4)	LSU (23–4)т	UConn (22–5)	LSU (25–5)	Iowa State (26–6)	Iowa State (28–7)	8.
9.	Oregon	Michigan (5–0)	Michigan (7–0)	Tennessee (8–0)	Tennessee (9–0)	Baylor (9–2)	Tennessee (11–1)	Maryland (10–4)	Iowa State (14–1)	Arizona (12–2)	UConn (11–4)	UConn (13–4)	Iowa State (20–3)	Michigan (20–4)	UConn (19–5)т	Michigan (22–5)	Texas (23–6)	LSU (23–7)	Maryland (23–9)	9.
10.	Michigan	Tennessee (4–0)	Tennessee (6–0)	Arizona (7–0)	Maryland (9–3)	Tennessee (10–1)	Baylor (9–2)	Texas (10–1)	Michigan (13–2)	LSU (17–2)	Texas (14–3)	Iowa State (18–3)	Tennessee (19–4)	Baylor (19–5)	Indiana (19–6)	Texas (21–6)	Indiana (22–8)	Iowa (23–7)	Indiana (24–9)	10.
11.	Iowa	Iowa (4–0)	Arizona (7–0)	Michigan (8–1)	Michigan (10–1)	UConn (6–3)	UConn (6–3)	UConn (6–3)	UConn (7–3)	Maryland (12–5)	LSU (17–3)	Georgia (16–4)	Baylor (17–5)	UConn (17–5)	Arizona (19–5)	Maryland (21–7)	Iowa (23–7)	Indiana (22–8)	Baylor (28–7)	11.
12.	Tennessee	Arizona (4–0)	Iowa (4–0)	Texas (6–1)	Texas (7–1)	Georgia (10–1)	Georgia (11–1)	Iowa State (12–1)	Texas (11–2)	UConn (9–4)	Georgia (15–4)	Baylor (15–4)	Maryland (17–6)	LSU (21–4)	Texas (19–6)	Indiana (19–7)	Michigan (22–6)	Michigan (22–6)	LSU (26–6)	12.
13.	Kentucky	Oregon (3–2)	Iowa State (7–0)	Iowa (5–1)	Iowa State (10–1)	Texas (8–1)	Texas (9–1)	Baylor (10–3)	Baylor (10–3)	Georgia (14–3)	Iowa State (16–3)	Texas (15–4)	LSU (19–4)	Maryland (19–6)	Maryland (20–7)	Arizona (20–6)	BYU (26–2)	Maryland (21–8)	Ohio State (25–7)	13.
14.	UCLA	Iowa State (4–0)	Texas (4–1)	Kentucky (6–1)	Georgia (8–1)	Iowa State (11–1)	Iowa State (11–1)	Georgia (12–2)	LSU (15–2)	Texas (12–3)	Baylor (13–4)	Maryland (15–6)	Georgia (17–5)	Texas (17–6)	Tennessee (21–6)	BYU (25–2)	Maryland (21–8)	BYU (26–3)	Iowa (24–8)	14.
15.	Arizona	UCLA (3–0)	Texas A&M (7–0)	Texas A&M (8–1)	Iowa (5–2)	Iowa (6–2)	Notre Dame (11–2)	North Carolina (13–0)	Georgia (13–3)	BYU (14–1)	Maryland (13–6)	LSU (18–4)	Oklahoma (20–3)	Oklahoma (20–4)	BYU (23–2)	Tennessee (22–7)	Ohio State (23–6)	Ohio State (23–6)	Tennessee (25–9)	15.
16.	Iowa State	Texas (3–1)	Oregon (3–2)	Iowa State (8–1)	South Florida (6–3)	South Florida (9–3)	Georgia Tech (10–2)	LSU (14–1)	Georgia Tech (11–3)	Baylor (11–4)	BYU (16–1)	BYU (18–1)	Georgia Tech (18–5)	BYU (21–2)	Notre Dame (20–6)	Ohio State (22–5)	Arizona (20–7)	Arizona (20–7)	North Carolina (25–7)	16.
17.	Texas A&M	Kentucky (3–1)	South Florida (5–2)	Georgia (7–1)т	Texas A&M (9–2)	Notre Dame (10–2)	Texas A&M (10–2)	Georgia Tech (10–3)	BYU (12–1)	Notre Dame (13–3)	Georgia Tech (15–4)	Georgia Tech (17–4)	Texas (15–6)	Georgia (17–7)	Ohio State (20–5)	North Carolina (23–5)	Tennessee (23–8)	Tennessee (23–8)	Notre Dame (25–9)	17.
18.	Oregon State	Texas A&M (4–0)	Kentucky (4–1)	BYU (8–0)т	Notre Dame (9–2)	Texas A&M (10–2)	North Carolina (11–0)	BYU (10–1)	North Carolina (14–1)	Georgia Tech (13–4)	Notre Dame (14–4)	Oklahoma (18–3)	BYU (19–2)	Georgia Tech (19–6)	North Carolina (21–5)	Iowa (20–7)	North Carolina (23–6)	North Carolina (23–6)	Arizona (21–8)	18.
19.	Georgia	Oregon State (3–0)	Georgia (6–0)	South Florida (5–3)	Kentucky (6–3)	Georgia Tech (9–2)	BYU (10–1)	Notre Dame (11–3)	Notre Dame (11–3)	Oklahoma (15–2)	Ohio State (15–3)	Notre Dame (16–4)	Notre Dame (18–5)	Ohio State (19–4)	Oklahoma (20–6)	Oklahoma (22–6)	Oklahoma (23–7)	Oklahoma (24–8)	BYU (26–4)	19.
20.	Georgia Tech	South Florida (4–2)	Ohio State (5–0)	Oregon State (4–2)	North Carolina (9–0)	North Carolina (10–0)	Kentucky (7–3)	Kentucky (7–3)	Kentucky (8–4)	North Carolina (14–2)	Florida Gulf Coast (17–1)	Florida Gulf Coast (19–1)	Florida Gulf Coast (21–1)	Notre Dame (19–6)	Georgia (18–8)	Notre Dame (21–7)	Florida Gulf Coast (27–2)	Florida Gulf Coast (29–2)	Florida Gulf Coast (30–3)	20.
21.	Texas	Georgia (4–0)	Oregon State (3–2)	Ohio State (6–1)	Georgia Tech (8–2)	Kentucky (7–3)	Iowa (6–3)	Iowa (7–3)	Duke (11–2)	Florida Gulf Coast (15–1)	Oklahoma (16–3)	Ohio State (16–4)	Ohio State (17–4)	Florida (19–6)	Florida (20–7)	Georgia (20–8)	Notre Dame (22–8)	Notre Dame (22–8)	Oklahoma (25–9)	21.
22.	South Florida	Florida State (4–0)	Florida Gulf Coast (7–0)	Oregon (4–3)	BYU (8–1)	BYU (9–1)	Duke (9–1)	Duke (10–2)	Colorado (13–0)	Kentucky (8–5)	North Carolina (15–3)	Oregon (14–5)	North Carolina (18–4)	Florida Gulf Coast (22–2)	Iowa (18–7)	Florida Gulf Coast (26–2)	Kentucky (19–11)	Kentucky (19–11)	UCF (26–4)	22.
23.	West Virginia	West Virginia (3–0)	BYU (7–0)	Notre Dame (7–2)	Oregon (6–3)	Duke (9–1)	South Florida (9–4)	Texas A&M (10–3)	Florida Gulf Coast (13–1)	Colorado (13–2)	Duke (13–4)	North Carolina (16–4)	Florida (17–6)	North Carolina (19–5)	Florida Gulf Coast (24–2)	UCF (21–3)	Virginia Tech (23–9)	Virginia Tech (23–9)	Creighton (23–10)	23.
24.	Florida State	Ohio State (3–0)	UCLA (4–2)	North Carolina (8–0)	Ohio State (7–2)	Ohio State (8–2)	LSU (12–1)	South Florida (10–4)	South Florida (11–4)	Duke (11–4)	Iowa (12–4)	Iowa (14–5)	Iowa (15–6)	Virginia Tech (19–6)	Georgia Tech (19–8)	Virginia Tech (21–8)	UCF (22–3)	UCF (25–3)	South Dakota (29–6)	24.
25.	Ohio State	Georgia Tech (4–1)	Notre Dame (6–1)	UCLA (5–2)	Duke (8–0)	Florida Gulf Coast (10–1)	Ohio State (9–2)	Oklahoma (12–1)	Oklahoma (13–2)	Ohio State (13–3)	Oregon (11–5)	Ole Miss (17–4)	Oregon (15–7)т Ole Miss (18–5)т	Iowa (16–7)	UCF (20–3)	Georgia Tech (20–9)	Georgia (20–9)	Georgia (20–9)	Virginia Tech (23–10)	25.
	Preseason Nov 3	Week 2 Nov 23	Week 3 Nov 30	Week 4 Dec 7	Week 5 Dec 14	Week 6 Dec 21	Week 7 Dec 28	Week 8 Jan 4	Week 9 Jan 11	Week 10 Jan 18	Week 11 Jan 25	Week 12 Feb 1	Week 13 Feb 8	Week 14 Feb 15	Week 15 Feb 22	Week 16 Mar 1	Week 17 Mar 8	Week 18 Mar 14	Final Apr 4	
		Dropped: None	Dropped: No. 22 Florida State; No. 23 West Virginia; No. 25 Georgia Tech	Dropped: No. 22 Florida Gulf Coast	Dropped: No. 20 Oregon State; No. 25 UCLA	Dropped: No. 23 Oregon	Dropped: No. 25 Florida Gulf Coast	Dropped: No. 25 Ohio State	Dropped: No. 21 Iowa; No. 23 Texas A&M	Dropped: No. 24 South Florida	Dropped: No. 22 Kentucky; No. 23 Colorado	Dropped: No. 23 Duke	Dropped: None	Dropped: No. 25т Oregon; No. 25т Ole Miss	Dropped: No. 24 Virginia Tech	Dropped: No. 21 Florida	Dropped: No. 25 Georgia Tech	Dropped: None	Dropped: No. 22 Kentucky; No. 25 Georgia	

== See also ==
2021–22 NCAA Division I men's basketball rankings
