= Diamond Johnson =

American basketball player

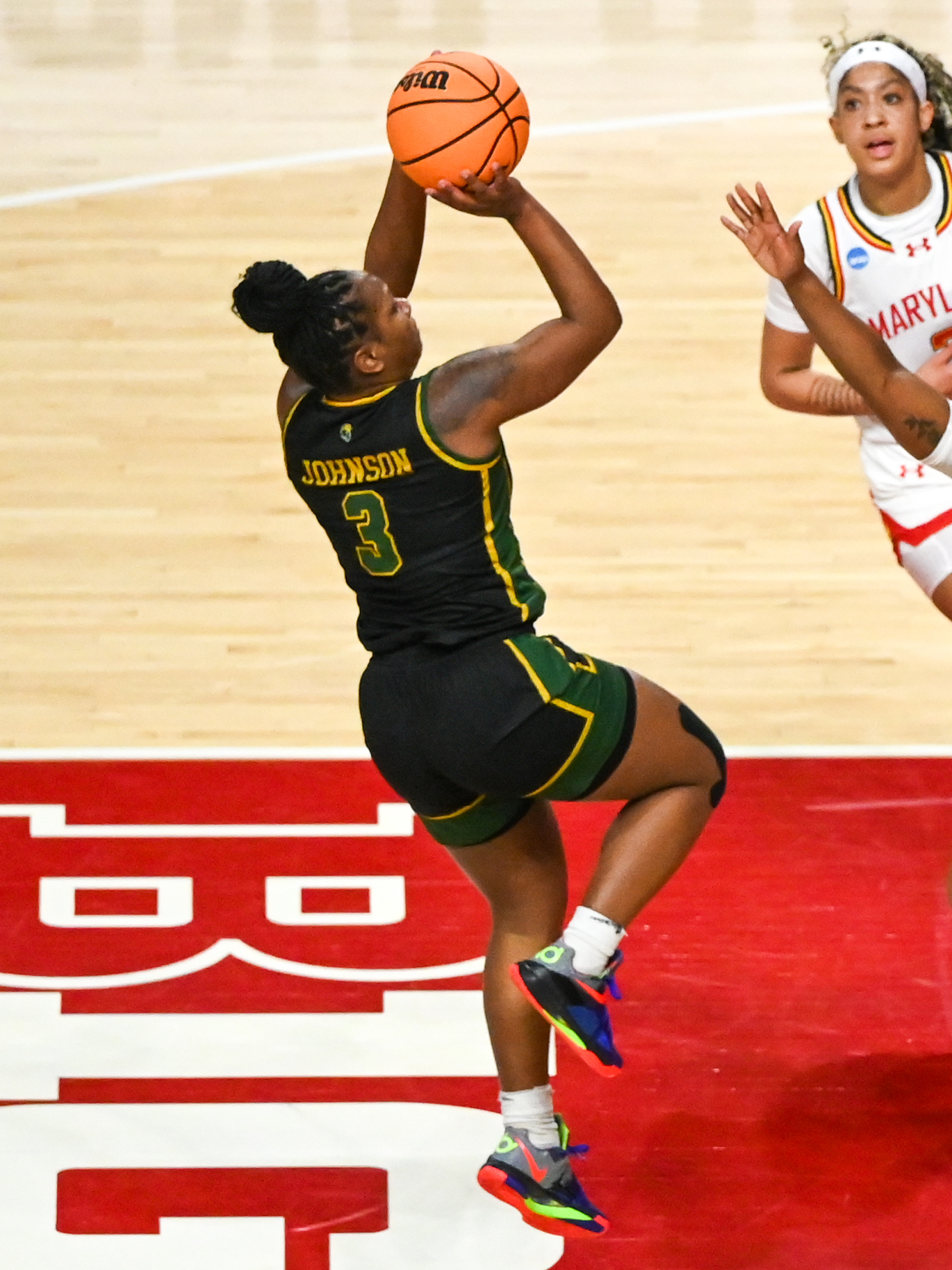
- Johnson in 2025

Greensboro Groove
- Position: Point guard

Personal information
- Born: April 15, 2002 (age 24) Philadelphia, Pennsylvania, U.S.
- Listed height: 5 ft 4 in (1.63 m)
- Listed weight: 175 lb (79 kg)

Career information
- High school: Phoebus (Hampton, Virginia); Neumann-Goretti (Philadelphia, Pennsylvania)
- College: Rutgers (2020–2021); NC State (2021–2023); Norfolk State (2023–2025)

Career history
- 2026–present: Greensboro Groove

Career highlights
- MEAC Player of the Year (2025); MEAC Tournament MVP (2024); 2× MEAC All-Defensive Team (2024, 2025); 2× First-team All-MEAC (2024, 2025); ACC Sixth Player of the Year (2022); Second-team All-ACC (2023); Second-team All-Big Ten (2021); Big Ten All-Freshman Team (2021)
- Stats at Basketball Reference
Medals
Women's basketball
Representing the United States
FIBA Under-19 World Cup
Gold medal – first place	2021 Hungary	Team

Diamond Johnson (born April 15, 2002) is an American professional basketball player who currently plays for the Greensboro Groove of the UpShot League. She played college basketball for the Rutgers Scarlet Knights, NC State Wolfpack and Norfolk State Spartans.

== Early life ==
Johnson was born in Philadelphia, Pennsylvania, to James Johnson and Dana Brooks, and was named after Diamond Street next to her family's neighborhood in North Philadelphia. At age 11, Johnson moved to Hampton, Virginia because her mother wanted her to live in a safer environment. Shortly after moving, she started playing organized basketball after attending tryouts for the Boo Williams Summer League, mistakenly thinking they were for a recreational league, and received an invitation to the league's Black Widows program. Johnson was coached by Black Widows director Reggie Williams for three years until starting high school.

== High school career ==
Johnson began her high school career at Phoebus High School in Hampton. As a freshman, she averaged 29.6 points, 4.5 steals, 4.4 assists and 4.1 rebounds per game, and was named Daily Press Player of the Year. Johnson was averaging 33.1 points per game for Phoebus as a sophomore before transferring to Saints John Neumann and Maria Goretti Catholic High School in Philadelphia during the season. She made the decision in part to be closer to her bedridden father. Johnson was ruled eligible prior to the Pennsylvania Interscholastic Athletic Association (PIAA) Class 3A state tournament and led Neumann-Goretti to its fourth straight state title.

As a junior, she scored a career-high 54 points in an 88–79 win over Imhotep Institute Charter High School at the Class 3A city championship. Johnson finished the season with averages of 28.1 points, 5.8 rebounds, 4.5 assists and four steals per game, and was named Philadelphia Catholic League Most Valuable Player (MVP) and Pennsylvania Gatorade Player of the Year. As a senior, Johnson averaged 29.9 points, six rebounds and five steals per game, repeating as Catholic League MVP and Pennsylvania Gatorade Player of the Year. Despite her success in high school, Johnson was excluded from the 2020 McDonald's All-American Game, a decision that was widely criticized in her hometown. She was named to the Jordan Brand Classic. Johnson was personally invited by Allen Iverson to play in the Roundball Classic, becoming the first woman to be selected to a men's high school All-America game. However, both games were canceled due to the COVID-19 pandemic.

=== Recruiting ===
Johnson was considered a five-star recruit and sixth-best player in the 2020 high school class by ESPN. On November 16, 2019, she committed to playing college basketball for Rutgers, who had offered her a scholarship during her freshman year of high school, over offers from NC State and South Carolina.

== College career ==
On February 17, 2021, Johnson scored a freshman season-high 26 points for Rutgers in an 83–56 win against Minnesota. At the Big Ten tournament quarterfinals, she scored 26 points for a second time, while adding eight rebounds and five steals in a 73–62 loss to Iowa. As a freshman, she averaged 17.6 points, 4.3 rebounds, 2.5 assists and 2.3 steals per game, earning second-team All-Big Ten and All-Freshman Team recognition. For her sophomore season, Johnson transferred to NC State. She came off the bench for one of the top teams in the nation, but was still among its most productive players. Johnson was named Atlantic Coast Conference (ACC) Sixth Player of the Year and received All-ACC Honorable Mention from the league's Blue Ribbon Panel. As a junior, she averaged 12.3 points, 4.2 rebounds and 3.5 assists per game and was limited to 22 games due to an ankle injury. Johnson was named second-team All-ACC. For her senior season, she transferred to Norfolk State.

== Professional career ==
Johnson went undrafted in the 2025 WNBA draft. On April 24, 2025, Johnson signed a training camp contract with the Minnesota Lynx. On May 7, she was waived by the Lynx.

In 2026, she signed with the UpShot League, an American developmental league. She plays for the Greensboro Groove.

== National team career ==
Johnson played for the United States women's national under-19 basketball team at the 2021 FIBA Under-19 Women's Basketball World Cup in Debrecen, Hungary. She averaged 12.6 points, 3.3 assists and 2.3 steals per game, helping her team win the gold medal with a 7–0 record. Johnson scored 15 points in a 70–52 victory over Australia in the title game.

== Career statistics ==
Legend
GP	Games played	GS	Games started	MPG	Minutes per game	RPG	Rebounds per game
APG	Assists per game	SPG	Steals per game	BPG	Blocks per game	PPG	Points per game
TO	Turnovers per game	FG%	Field-goal percentage	3P%	3-point field-goal percentage	FT%	Free-throw percentage
**Bold**	Career best	°	League leader

=== College ===
Year	Team	GP	GS	MPG	FG%	3P%	FT%	RPG	APG	SPG	BPG	TO	PPG
2020–21	Rutgers	19	15	33.5	**51.2**	**45.5**	**90.2**	4.2	2.5	2.3	**0.2**	**1.7**	17.6
2021–22	NC State	**36**	1	22.3	40.2	36.0	81.8	3.9	2.2	1.3	0.0	2.0	10.8
2022–23	NC State	22	21	28.3	41.6	36.2	87.0	4.2	3.5	1.3	**0.2**	2.0	12.3
2023–24	Norfolk State	23	23	33.1	43.3	38.3	83.6	5.4	2.9	**3.8**	0.0	1.9	**20.2**
2024–25	Norfolk State	35	**34**	**33.9**	47.0	35.2	83.1	**6.1**	**4.1**	3.6	**0.2**	2.1	18.9
**Career**		135	94	29.7	44.6	37.7	84.6	4.8	3.0	2.5	0.1	2.0	15.7
Statistics retrieved from Sports-Reference.

== Personal life ==
Johnson's father, James, died in December 2018 due to complications from stroke and other health issues. She dedicates each of her basketball games to him.
