= Gulf Coast State College Commodores =

American college athletics program

Gulf Coast State Commodores
- University: Gulf Coast State College
- Conference: Panhandle Conference
- NJCAA: Region 8
- Athletic director: Mike Kandler
- Location: Panama City, Florida
- Varsity teams: 5 (2 men's, 3 women's)
- Basketball arena: Billy Harrison Field House
- Baseball stadium: Bill Frazier Field, Joe Tom King Field
- Softball stadium: Joe Tom King Field
- Mascot: Commodores
- Nickname: Gulf Coast Commodores
- Colors: Blue, Gold, and White
- Website: www.gcathletics.com

Gulf Coast State College athletic teams are nicknamed the Commodores and compete in the Panhandle Conference of the Florida State College Activities Association, a body of the National Junior College Athletic Association Region 8. The current athletic director is Mike Kandler who has been serving in this capacity since 2018.

== Championships ==
The Commodores have won a total of 74 championships. 32 of those belong to the women's basketball team.

=== Conference Championships ===
Sport	Conference	Championship Years	Number of Championships
Basketball (Women's)	Panhandle Conference	1981, 1998-2010, 2012-2013, 2016-2017, 2019	18
Softball	Panhandle Conference	2001, 2002, 2004-2006, 2013	6
Volleyball (Women's)	Panhandle Conference	1998, 1999, 2000, 2003, 2007, 2013, 2014	7
Basketball (Men's)	Panhandle Conference	1971, 1972, 1976, 1992, 1999	5
Baseball	Panhandle Conference	1964-1970, 1979, 1981, 1984, 1989-1990, 1994, 1997-1998, 2006, 2010	17
Total Championships:			52

=== Regional Championships ===
Sport	Region	Championship Years	Number of Championships
Baseball	Region 8	1965, 1973	2
Softball	Region 8	1998, 2001, 2006	3
Basketball (Women's)	Region 8	1998-2000, 2002-2004, 2008, 2010, 2012-2013, 2016-2017, 2019	13
Basketball (Men's)	Region 8	1971, 1972	2
Total Championships:			18

=== National Championships ===
Sport	Association	Championship Years	Number of Championships
Basketball (Women's)	NJCAA	2003, 2008, 2010, 2016, 2017	5
Total Championships:			5

== Current Coaches ==
Mary "Roonie" Scovel coached the Lady Commodores from 1996-2012. When she retired Vernette Skeete became head coach. After the 2013-14 season Skeete took a job offer at Marquette so Roonie returned. She has a historic record of 17 Panhandle Conference Championships, 12 Regional Championships, and 6 National Championships.

Kristian Robertson was hired after Head Coach Kyle Peck stepped down. Robertson, who played at Gulf Coast from 2010-2012, has been the assistant coach for former coach Kyle Peck since 2014.

Beth Wade is only the second softball coach at Gulf Coast. She prepares for her 3rd season following Susan Painters 892-328 run.

Jay Powell is the 16th coach for the Gulf Coast men's basketball team. He has never won a conference title.

Mike Kandler Coach Kandler has won 2 Panhandle Conference championships (2006, 2010) and has taken the Commodores to the playoffs five times (2006-2007, 2010, 2014-2015)

Head coaches
Mary Scovel (Women's Basketball) 2014–present (2nd Stint)
Kristian Robertson (Women's Volleyball) 2016–present
Beth Wade (Softball) 2014–present
Jay Powell (Men's Basketball) 2007–present
Mike Kandler (Baseball) 2005–present
