= 2021–22 Syracuse Orange women's basketball team =

Intercollegiate basketball season

2021–22 Syracuse Orange women's basketball
- Conference: Atlantic Coast Conference
- Record: 11–18 (4–14 ACC)
- Head coach: Vonn Read (Interim) (1st season)
- Assistant coaches: John Marcum; Erica Morrow
- Home arena: Carrier Dome

2021–22 ACC women's basketball standings
	Conf.				Overall
Team	W		L	PCT	W		L	PCT
No. 3 NC State †	17	–	1	.944	32	–	4	.889
No. 4 Louisville	16	–	2	.889	29	–	5	.853
No. 17 North Carolina	13	–	5	.722	25	–	7	.781
No. 21 Notre Dame	13	–	5	.722	24	–	9	.727
No. 16 Virginia Tech	13	–	5	.722	23	–	10	.697
Georgia Tech	11	–	7	.611	21	–	11	.656
Boston College	10	–	8	.556	21	–	12	.636
Miami (FL)	10	–	8	.556	21	–	13	.618
Florida State	10	–	8	.556	17	–	14	.548
Duke	7	–	11	.389	17	–	13	.567
Wake Forest	4	–	14	.222	16	–	17	.485
Syracuse	4	–	14	.222	11	–	18	.379
Clemson	3	–	15	.167	10	–	21	.323
Pittsburgh	2	–	16	.111	11	–	19	.367
Virginia	2	–	16	.111	5	–	22	.185
† 2022 ACC tournament winner Rankings from AP poll

The 2021–22 Syracuse Orange women's basketball team represented Syracuse University during the 2021–22 NCAA Division I women's basketball season. The Orange were led by interim head coach Vonn Read. The Orange are ninth year members of the Atlantic Coast Conference and played their home games at the Carrier Dome in Syracuse, New York.

Previous head coach Quentin Hillsman resigned amid investigations into allegations of inappropriate behavior on August 2, 2021. Associate head coach Vonn Read was named the interim head coach for the 2021–2022 season on August 4, 2021.

The Orange finished the season 11–18 overall and 4–14 in ACC play to finish in a tie for eleventh place. As the twelfth seed in the ACC tournament, they lost to Clemson in their First Round matchup. They were not invited to the NCAA tournament or the WNIT.

== Previous season ==
The Orange finished the season 15–9 and 9–7 in ACC play to finish in a tie for fourth place. As the fifth seed in the ACC tournament, they defeated to Boston College in the Second Round and Florida State in the Quarterfinals before losing to Louisville in the Semifinals. They received an at-large bid to the NCAA tournament where they were the eight seed in the Riverwalk Regional. In the tournament they defeated nine seed South Dakota State in the First Round before losing to one seed UConn to end their season.

== Off-season ==
=== Departures ===
Departures
Name	Number	Pos.	Height	Year	Hometown	Reason for departure
Taleah Washington	1	G	5'7"	Sophomore	District Heights, Maryland	Transferred to Old Dominion
Maeva Djaldi-Tabdi	3	F	6'2"	(redshirt) Junior	Paris, France	Transferred to Miami (FL)
Tiana Mangakahia	4	G	5'6"	Graduate Student	Meadowbrook, Queensland	Graduated
Khamya McNeal	11	G	5'8"	Freshman	Milwaukee, Wisconsin	Transferred to Stetson
Faith Blackstone	12	G	6'0"	Freshman	Harrisburg, Pennsylvania	Transferred to North Carolina A&T
Maud Huijbens	13	F	6'5"	Freshman	Hilversum, Netherlands	Transferred to Gonzaga
Kamilla Cardoso	14	C	6'7"	Freshman	Montes Claros, Brazil	Transferred to South Carolina
Kiara Fisher	15	G	5'7"	Freshman	Elmira, New York	Transferred to Marist
Emily Engstler	21	G	6'0"	Junior	Fresh Meadows, New York	Transferred to Louisville
Amaya Finklea-Guity	22	C	6'4"	Senior	Dorchester, Massachusetts	Transferred to Duke
Kiara Lewis	23	G	5'8"	(redshirt) Senior	Chicago, Illinois	Transferred to Clemson
Lauren Fitzmaurice	25	G	5'8"	Senior	Mazama, Washington	Transferred to Marist
Digna Strautmane	45	F	6'2"	Senior	Riga, Latvia	Transferred to Georgia Tech

=== Incoming transfers ===
Incoming transfers
Name	Number	Pos.	Height	Year	Hometown	Previous school
Alaysia Styles	4	F	6'3"	Graduate Student	San Diego, California	Maryland
Najé Murray	10	G	5'6"	Graduate Student	Stockton, California	Texas Tech
Jayla Thornton	11	G	5'10"	Graduate Student	Newark, New Jersey	Howard
Eboni Walker	22	F	6'0"	Junior	Las Vegas, Nevada	Arizona State
Alaina Rice	25	G	5'8"	Junior	Rockledge, Florida	Auburn
Chrislyn Carr	32	G	5'5"	Senior	Davenport, Iowa	Texas Tech
Christianna Carr	43	G	6'1"	Senior	Eden Prairie, Minnesota	Kansas State

=== Recruiting class ===
College recruiting information
Name	Hometown	School	Height	Weight	Commit date
Nyah Wilson; G	Dallas, Texas	Duncanville High School	5 ft 8 in (1.73 m)	N/A	Apr 18, 2020
Nyah Wilson; G	Recruit ratings: ESPN: (91)				
Overall recruit ranking:
Note: In many cases, Scout, Rivals, 247Sports, On3, and ESPN may conflict in their listings of height and weight.; In these cases, the average was taken. ESPN grades are on a 100-point scale.; Sources:

== Roster ==
2021–22 Syracuse Orange women's basketball team
Players
Coaches

Pos.	#	Name	Height	Year	Previous school	Hometown
G	0	Ava Irvin	5 ft 8 in (1.73 m)	So	Greater Atlanta Christian School	Atlanta, GA
G	2	Priscilla Williams	6 ft 2 in (1.88 m)	So	Branson	Branson, MO
G	3	Nyah Wilson	5 ft 8 in (1.73 m)	Fr	Duncanville	Dallas, TX
F	4	Alaysia Styles	6 ft 3 in (1.91 m)	GS	La Jolla Country Day; Maryland	San Diego, CA
G	5	Teisha Hyman	5 ft 8 in (1.73 m)	RS So	Woodlands	White Plains, NY
G	10	Najé Murray	5 ft 6 in (1.68 m)	GS	St. Mary's; Texas Tech	Stockton, CA
G	11	Jayla Thornton	5 ft 10 in (1.78 m)	GS	Newark Tech; Howard	Newark, NJ
F	22	Eboni Walker	6 ft 0 in (1.83 m)	Jr	Centennial; Arizona State	Las Vegas, NV
G	25	Alaina Rice	5 ft 8 in (1.73 m)	Jr	IMG Academy; Auburn	Rockledge, FL
G	30	Julianna Walker	5 ft 6 in (1.68 m)	Fr	Annie Wright Schools	Tacoma, WA
G	32	Chrislyn Carr	5 ft 5 in (1.65 m)	Sr	Rock Island; Texas Tech; Baylor	Davenport, IA
G	43	Christianna Carr	6 ft 1 in (1.85 m)	Sr	Manhattan; Kansas State	Eden Prairie, MN

Head coach

- Vonn Read (Clark Atlanta)

Assistant coach(es)

- John Marcum (Oklahoma Baptist)
- Erica Morrow (Syracuse)

Legend

- (C) Team captain
- (S) Suspended
- (I) Ineligible
- (W) Walk-on
- Injured
- Current redshirt

Roster
Last update: November 5, 2021

== Schedule ==
Date time, TV	Rank^{#}	Opponent^{#}	Result	Record	Site (attendance) city, state
Regular Season
November 10, 2021*; 7:00 p.m., ACCNX		Monmouth	W 87–46	1–0	Carrier Dome (1,008); Syracuse, NY
November 14, 2021; Noon, ACCN		Notre Dame	L 56–82	1–1 (0–1)	Carrier Dome (3,345); Syracuse, NY
November 17, 2021*; 7:00 p.m., ACCNX		Morgan State	W 79–60	2–1	Carrier Dome (825); Syracuse, NY
November 20, 2021*; 2:30 p.m., FloHoops		vs. No. 23 South Florida; Battle 4 Atlantis quarterfinals	L 53–77	2–2	Imperial Arena (993); Paradise Island, Bahamas
November 21, 2021*; 5:00 p.m., FloHoops		vs. Minnesota; Battle 4 Atlantis	L 63–70	2–3	Imperial Arena (420); Paradise Island, Bahamas
November 22, 2021*; 2:00 p.m., FloHoops		vs. Buffalo; Battle 4 Atlantis	L 79–88	2–4	Imperial Arena (329); Paradise Island, Bahamas
November 28, 2021*; 2:00 p.m., ACCNX		Colgate	W 79–57	3–4	Carrier Dome (918); Syracuse, NY
December 1, 2021*; 8:00 p.m., ACCN		No. 18т Ohio State; ACC–Big Ten Women's Challenge	W 97–91	4–4	Carrier Dome (847); Syracuse, NY
December 5, 2021*; 2:00 p.m., ACCNX		Central Connecticut State	W 116–65	5–4	Carrier Dome (907); Syracuse, NY
December 8, 2021*; 7:00 p.m., ACCNX		Cornell	W 85–55	6–4	Carrier Dome (801); Syracuse, NY
December 11, 2021; 6:00 p.m., ACCNX		Clemson	W 86–46	7–4 (1–1)	Carrier Dome (1,009); Syracuse, NY
December 18, 2021*; 11:00 a.m., ACCNX		UMBC	W 82–50	8–4	Carrier Dome (915); Syracuse, NY
December 22, 2021*; 2:00 p.m., ACCNX		Siena	Canceled due to COVID-19 issues		Carrier Dome; Syracuse, NY
December 30, 2021; 6:00 p.m., ACCN		at No. 24 North Carolina	L 43–79	8–5 (1–2)	Carmichael Arena (1,625); Chapel Hill, NC
January 2, 2022; 2:00 p.m., ACCNX		Florida State	Postponed due to COVID-19 issues		Carrier Dome; Syracuse, NY
January 6, 2022; 7:00 p.m., ACCNX		at Boston College	L 71–95	8–6 (1–3)	Conte Forum (424); Chestnut Hill, MA
January 9, 2022; 2:00 p.m., ACCRSN		No. 17 Duke	L 65–74	8–7 (1–4)	Carrier Dome (1,133); Syracuse, NY
January 13, 2022; 7:00 p.m., ACCNX		at No. 3 Louisville	L 71–84	8–8 (1–5)	KFC Yum! Center (7,307); Louisville, KY
January 16, 2022; 1:00 p.m., ACCNX		at Virginia	Postponed due to inclement weather		John Paul Jones Arena; Charlottesville, VA
January 20, 2022; 8:00 p.m., ACCN		No. 18 Georgia Tech	L 55–65	8–9 (1–6)	Carrier Dome (746); Syracuse, NY
January 27, 2022; 6:00 p.m., ACCN		at No. 20 Notre Dame	L 62–83	8–10 (1–7)	Purcell Pavilion (4,493); Notre Dame, IN
January 30, 2022; Noon, ACCN		Pittsburgh	W 80–72	9–10 (2–7)	Carrier Dome (1,056); Syracuse, NY
February 3, 2022; 7:00 p.m., ACCNX		at Miami (FL)	L 65–71	9–11 (2–8)	Watsco Center; Coral Gables, FL
February 6, 2022; Noon, ACCRSN		No. 4 Louisville	L 64–100	9–12 (2–9)	Carrier Dome (1,401); Syracuse, NY
February 8, 2022; 6:00 p.m., ACCNX		at Virginia; Rescheduled from Jan. 16, 2022	W 77–70	10–12 (3–9)	John Paul Jones Arena (1,556); Charlottesville, VA
February 13, 2022; 2:00 p.m., ACCN		at Pittsburgh	W 67–65	11–12 (4–9)	Peterson Events Center (2,073); Pittsburgh, PA
February 15, 2022; 6:00 p.m., ACCNX		Florida State; Rescheduled from Jan 2, 2022	L 67–73	11–13 (4–10)	Carrier Dome (881); Syracuse, NY
February 17, 2022; 7:00 p.m., ACCNX		No. 23 Virginia Tech	L 53–102	11–14 (4–11)	Carrier Dome (801); Syracuse, NY
February 20, 2022; 2:00 p.m., ACCRSN		at No. 4 NC State	L 35–95	11–15 (4–12)	Reynolds Coliseum (5,500); Raleigh, NC
February 24, 2022; 7:00 p.m., ACCNX		at Wake Forest	L 60–76	11–16 (4–13)	LJVM Coliseum (1,997); Winston–Salem, NC
February 27, 2022; Noon, ACCN		Boston College	L 75–91	11–17 (4–14)	Carrier Dome (1,214); Syracuse, NY
ACC Women's Tournament
March 2, 2022; 1:00 p.m., ACCRSN	(12)	vs. (13) Clemson; First Round	L 69–88	11–18	Greensboro Coliseum (3,619); Greensboro, NC
*Non-conference game. ^{#}Rankings from AP Poll. (#) Tournament seedings in parentheses. All times are in Eastern.

== Rankings ==
Regular season polls
Poll	Pre- Season	Week 2	Week 3	Week 4	Week 5	Week 6	Week 7	Week 8	Week 9	Week 10	Week 11	Week 12	Week 13	Week 14	Week 15	Week 16	Week 17	Week 18	Final
AP																			
Coaches																			

Legend
	Increase in ranking
	Decrease in ranking
	Not ranked in previous week
(RV)	Received Votes
(NR)	Not Ranked

Coaches did not release a Week 2 poll and AP does not release a poll after the NCAA tournament.

== See also ==
- 2021–22 Syracuse Orange men's basketball team
