= 2021–22 Georgia Tech Yellow Jackets women's basketball team =

Intercollegiate basketball season

2021–22 Georgia Tech Yellow Jackets women's basketball

NCAA tournament, first round
- Conference: Atlantic Coast Conference
- Record: 21–11 (11–7 ACC)
- Head coach: Nell Fortner (3rd season)
- Assistant coaches: Tasha Butts; Blanche Alverson; Murriel Page
- Home arena: McCamish Pavilion

2021–22 ACC women's basketball standings
	Conf.				Overall
Team	W		L	PCT	W		L	PCT
No. 3 NC State †	17	–	1	.944	32	–	4	.889
No. 4 Louisville	16	–	2	.889	29	–	5	.853
No. 17 North Carolina	13	–	5	.722	25	–	7	.781
No. 21 Notre Dame	13	–	5	.722	24	–	9	.727
No. 16 Virginia Tech	13	–	5	.722	23	–	10	.697
Georgia Tech	11	–	7	.611	21	–	11	.656
Boston College	10	–	8	.556	21	–	12	.636
Miami (FL)	10	–	8	.556	21	–	13	.618
Florida State	10	–	8	.556	17	–	14	.548
Duke	7	–	11	.389	17	–	13	.567
Wake Forest	4	–	14	.222	16	–	17	.485
Syracuse	4	–	14	.222	11	–	18	.379
Clemson	3	–	15	.167	10	–	21	.323
Pittsburgh	2	–	16	.111	11	–	19	.367
Virginia	2	–	16	.111	5	–	22	.185
† 2022 ACC tournament winner Rankings from AP poll

The 2021–22 Georgia Tech Yellow Jackets women's basketball team represented the Georgia Institute of Technology during the 2021–22 NCAA Division I women's basketball season. They were led by third-year head coach Nell Fortner and played their home games at McCamish Pavilion as members of the Atlantic Coast Conference.

The Yellow Jackets finished the season 21–11 overall and 11–7 in ACC play to finish in sixth place. As the sixth seed in the ACC tournament, they defeated Wake Forest in the second round before losing to Notre Dame in the quarterfinals. They received an at-large bid to the NCAA tournament where they were the ninth seed in the Spokane Regional. They lost their First Round match-up against Kansas to end their season.

== Previous season ==
The Yellow Jackets finished the season 17–9 and 12–6 in ACC play to finish in third place. In the ACC tournament, they defeated to Clemson in the quarterfinals before losing to eventual champions NC State in the semifinals. They received an at-large bid to the NCAA tournament where they were the five seed in the HemisFair Regional. In the tournament they defeated twelve seed Stephen F. Austin in the first round and four seed West Virginia before losing to one seed South Carolina in the Sweet Sixteen to end their season.

== Off-season ==
=== Departures ===
Departures
Name	Number	Pos.	Height	Year	Hometown	Reason for departure
Anaya Boyd	4	G	5'10"	Sophomore	McDonough, Georgia	Transferred to Gulf Coast State
Ronni Nwora	21	F/C	6'2"	Sophomore	Buffalo, New York	—

=== Incoming transfers ===
Incoming transfers
Name	Number	Pos.	Height	Year	Hometown	Previous school
Digna Strautmane	45	F	6'2"	Graduate Student	Riga, Latvia	Syracuse

=== Recruiting class ===
College recruiting information
Name	Hometown	School	Height	Weight	Commit date
Elizabete Bulane; G	Ādaži, Latvia	Riga Commercial School	5 ft 7 in (1.70 m)	N/A	
Elizabete Bulane; G	Recruit ratings: No ratings found				
Carmyn Harrison; G	Memphis, Tennessee	Hutchison School	N/A	N/A	
Carmyn Harrison; G	Recruit ratings: No ratings found				
Overall recruit ranking:
Note: In many cases, Scout, Rivals, 247Sports, On3, and ESPN may conflict in their listings of height and weight.; In these cases, the average was taken. ESPN grades are on a 100-point scale.; Sources:

== Roster ==
2021–22 Georgia Tech Yellow Jackets women's basketball team
Players
Coaches

Pos.	#	Name	Height	Year	Previous school	Hometown
G	00	Loyal McQueen	5 ft 8 in (1.73 m)	So	Wilson	Florence, SC
G	3	Sarah Bates	5 ft 9 in (1.75 m)	RS Sr	Kansas State	Fresno, California
G	10	Elizabete Bulane	5 ft 7 in (1.7 m)	Fr	Riga Commercial School	Ādaži, Latvia
F	11	Aixa Wone Aranaz	6 ft 3 in (1.91 m)	Jr	Ohio State	Pamplona, Spain
G	12	Kondalia Montgomery	5 ft 7 in (1.7 m)	Jr	Lincoln	Tacoma, WA
G	13	Lorela Cubaj	6 ft 4 in (1.93 m)	GS	Istituto Paritario G. Parini	Terni, Italy
G	14	Anisa Clark	5 ft 7 in (1.7 m)	So	Union Grove	McDonough, GA
G	15	Avyonce Carter	5 ft 10 in (1.78 m)	So	Wesleyan	Norcross, GA
C	20	Nerea Hermosa	6 ft 5 in (1.96 m)	Jr	IES Joaquim Blume	Victoria, Spain
G/F	24	Eylia Love	6 ft 1 in (1.85 m)	So	Olathe North	Kansas City, MO
G	31	Lotta-Maj Lahtinen	5 ft 7 in (1.7 m)	Sr	Makelanrinne Sports	Helsinki, Finland
G	33	Carmyn Harrison	5 ft 9 in (1.75 m)	Fr	Hutchison School	Memphis, TN
G	41	Kierra Fletcher	5 ft 9 in (1.75 m)	GS	Warren Cousino	Warren, MI
F	45	Digna Strautmane	6 ft 2 in (1.88 m)	GS	Riga 66; Syracuse	Riga, Latvia

Head coach

- Nell Fortner (Texas)

Assistant coach(es)

- Tasha Butts (Tennessee)
- Blanche Alverson (Auburn)
- Murriel Page (Florida)

Legend

- (C) Team captain
- (S) Suspended
- (I) Ineligible
- (W) Walk-on
- Injured
- Current redshirt

Roster
Last update: October 27, 2021

== Schedule ==
Date time, TV	Rank^{#}	Opponent^{#}	Result	Record	Site (attendance) city, state
Exhibition
November 1, 2021*; 6:00 p.m.	No. 17	Clayton State	W 74–53	–	McCamish Pavilion (1,279); Atlanta, GA
Regular Season
November 9, 2021*; 6:00 p.m., ESPN+	No. 17	at Central Michigan	W 74–40	1–0	McGuirk Arena (0); Mount Pleasant, MI
November 11, 2021*; 7:00 p.m., ACCNX	No. 17	Kennesaw State	W 72–45	2–0	McCamish Pavilion (1,474); Atlanta, GA
November 14, 2021*; 2:00 p.m., ACCNX	No. 17	Belmont	W 58–45	3–0	McCamish Pavilion (1,501); Atlanta, GA
November 17, 2021*; 7:00 p.m., ESPN+	No. 18	at East Tennessee State	W 65–42	4–0	Brooks Gym (816); Johnson City, TN
November 21, 2021*; 4:00 p.m., ACCN	No. 18	Auburn	L 51–59	4–1	McCamish Pavilion (1,769); Atlanta, GA
November 24, 2021*; Noon, ACCNX		Hofstra	W 65–32	5–1	McCamish Pavilion (1,440); Atlanta, GA
December 1, 2021*; 7:00 p.m., BTN		at Purdue; ACC–Big Ten Women's Challenge	L 52–53	5–2	Mackey Arena (1,539); West Lafayette, IN
December 5, 2021*; Noon, SECN		at No. 20 Georgia; Rivalry	W 55–54	6–2	Stegeman Coliseum (3,220); Athens, GA
December 9, 2021*; 7:00 p.m., ESPN2		No. 3 Connecticut	W 57–44	7–2	McCamish Pavilion (4,587); Atlanta, GA
December 12, 2021*; 1:00 p.m., ACCNX		Furman	W 63–36	8–2	McCamish Pavilion (1,574); Atlanta, GA
December 19, 2021; 6:00 p.m., ACCN	No. 18	Wake Forest	W 62–45	9–2 (1–0)	McCamish Pavilion (1,667); Atlanta, GA
December 21, 2021*; 1:00 p.m., ACCNX	No. 17	Boston	W 78–49	10–2	McCamish Pavilion (1,443); Atlanta, GA
December 30, 2021; 6:00 p.m., ACCNX	No. 16	at Pittsburgh	Postponed due to COVID-19 issues		Petersen Events Center; Pittsburgh, PA
January 2, 2022; Noon, ACCN	No. 16	No. 3 Louisville	L 48–50	10–3 (1–1)	McCamish Pavilion (1,918); Atlanta, GA
January 6, 2022; 7:00 p.m., ACCNX	No. 16	at No. 17 Duke	Postponed due to COVID-19 issues		Cameron Indoor Stadium; Durham, NC
January 9, 2022; 4:00 p.m., ACCN	No. 16	Virginia	W 67–31	11–3 (2–1)	McCamish Pavilion (1,841); Atlanta, GA
January 11, 2022; 6:00 p.m., ACCNX	No. 15	at Pittsburgh	W 63–52	12–3 (3–1)	Petersen Events Center (1,286); Pittsburgh, PA
January 13, 2022; 8:00 p.m., ACCN	No. 15	Florida State	W 68–64	13–3 (4–1)	McCamish Pavilion (1,459); Atlanta, GA
January 16, 2022; 2:00 p.m., ACCN	No. 15	at Miami (FL)	L 45–46	13–4 (4–2)	Watsco Center (1,256); Coral Gables, FL
January 20, 2022; 8:00 p.m., ACCN	No. 18	at Syracuse	W 65–55	14–4 (5–2)	Carrier Dome (746); Syracuse, NY
January 23, 2022; Noon, ACCN	No. 18	No. 20 North Carolina	W 55–38	15–4 (6–2)	McCamish Pavilion (2,357); Atlanta, GA
January 27, 2022; 7:00 p.m., ACCNX	No. 14	Boston College	W 68–49	16–4 (7–2)	McCamish Pavilion (1,528); Atlanta, GA
January 30, 2022; 6:00 p.m., ACCN	No. 14	at Clemson	W 69–62	17–4 (8–2)	Littlejohn Coliseum (893); Clemson, SC
February 1, 2022; 7:00 p.m., ACCNX	No. 12	at Duke; Rescheduled from Jan. 6	W 59–46	18–4 (9–2)	Cameron Indoor Stadium (1,582); Durham, NC
February 7, 2022; 6:00 p.m., ESPN2	No. 11	at No. 5 NC State	L 48–59	18–5 (9–3)	Reynolds Coliseum (5,500); Raleigh, NC
February 10, 2022; 8:00 p.m., ACCRSN	No. 11	at Virginia Tech	L 63–73	18–6 (9–4)	Cassell Coliseum (1,551); Blacksburg, VA
February 13, 2022; Noon, ACCRSN	No. 11	Clemson	W 92–84 ^{OT}	19–6 (10–4)	McCamish Pavilion (2,268); Atlanta, GA
February 17, 2022; 8:00 p.m., ACCN	No. 16	No. 19 Notre Dame	L 66–72 ^{OT}	19–7 (10–5)	McCamish Pavilion (3,099); Atlanta, GA
February 20, 2022; 2:00 p.m., ACCNX	No. 16	Miami (FL)	L 39–51	19–8 (10–6)	McCamish Pavilion (2,038); Atlanta, GA
February 24, 2022; 6:00 p.m., ACCN	No. 22	at Florida State	L 63–65 ^{OT}	19–9 (10–7)	Donald L. Tucker Center (2,364); Tallahassee, FL
February 27, 2022; 1:00 p.m., ACCNX	No. 22	at Wake Forest	W 64–56	20–9 (11–7)	LJVM Coliseum; Winston–Salem, NC
ACC Women's Tournament
March 3, 2022; 8:00 p.m., ACCRSN	(6) No. 25	vs. (11) Wake Forest; Second Round	W 45–40	21–9	Greensboro Coliseum (5,648); Greensboro, NC
March 4, 2022; 8:00 p.m., ACCRSN	(6) No. 25	vs. (3) No. 20 Notre Dame; Quarterfinals	L 53–71	21–10	Greensboro Coliseum (5,682); Greensboro, NC
NCAA tournament
March 18, 2022; 7:30 p.m., ESPNU	(9 S)	vs. (8 S) Kansas; First Round	L 58–77	21–11	Maples Pavilion; Stanford, CA
*Non-conference game. ^{#}Rankings from AP Poll,. (#) Tournament seedings in parentheses. S=Spokane. All times are in Eastern Time.

== Rankings ==
Regular season polls
Poll	Pre- Season	Week 2	Week 3	Week 4	Week 5	Week 6	Week 7	Week 8	Week 9	Week 10	Week 11	Week 12	Week 13	Week 14	Week 15	Week 16	Week 17	Week 18	Final
AP	17т	18	RV	RV	RV	18	17	16	16	15	18	14	12	11	16	22	25	RV	RV
Coaches	20	25	RV	RV	21	19	16	17	16	18	17	17	16	18	24	25	RV	RV	RV

Legend
	Increase in ranking
	Decrease in ranking
	Not ranked previous week
(RV)	Received Votes

== See also ==
2021–22 Georgia Tech Yellow Jackets men's basketball team
