= 2021–22 Clemson Tigers women's basketball team =

Women's college basketball season

2021–22 Clemson Tigers women's basketball
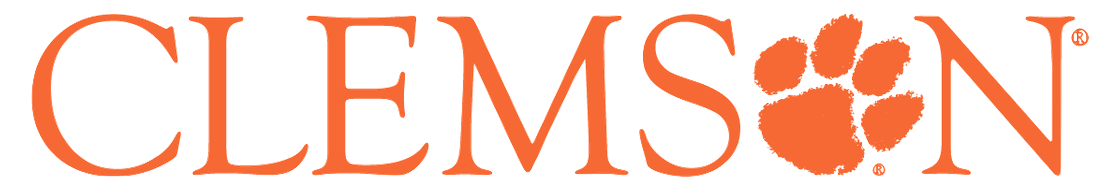
- Conference: Atlantic Coast Conference
- Record: 10–21 (3–15 ACC)
- Head coach: Amanda Butler (4th season)
- Assistant coaches: Joy Smith (4th season); Daniel Barber (4th season); Priscilla Edwards (1st season)
- Home arena: Littlejohn Coliseum

2021–22 ACC women's basketball standings
	Conf.				Overall
Team	W		L	PCT	W		L	PCT
No. 3 NC State †	17	–	1	.944	32	–	4	.889
No. 4 Louisville	16	–	2	.889	29	–	5	.853
No. 17 North Carolina	13	–	5	.722	25	–	7	.781
No. 21 Notre Dame	13	–	5	.722	24	–	9	.727
No. 16 Virginia Tech	13	–	5	.722	23	–	10	.697
Georgia Tech	11	–	7	.611	21	–	11	.656
Boston College	10	–	8	.556	21	–	12	.636
Miami (FL)	10	–	8	.556	21	–	13	.618
Florida State	10	–	8	.556	17	–	14	.548
Duke	7	–	11	.389	17	–	13	.567
Wake Forest	4	–	14	.222	16	–	17	.485
Syracuse	4	–	14	.222	11	–	18	.379
Clemson	3	–	15	.167	10	–	21	.323
Pittsburgh	2	–	16	.111	11	–	19	.367
Virginia	2	–	16	.111	5	–	22	.185
† 2022 ACC tournament winner Rankings from AP poll

The 2021–22 Clemson Tigers women's basketball team represented Clemson University during the 2021–22 college basketball season. The Tigers were led by fourth-year head coach Amanda Butler. The Tigers, members of the Atlantic Coast Conference, played their home games at Littlejohn Coliseum.

During the offseason, assistant coach Shimmy Gray-Miller left Clemson to become assistant coach at Minnesota. The Tigers hired Priscilla Edwards as her replacement.

The Tigers finished the season 10–21 and 3–15 in ACC play to finish in thirteenth place. In the ACC tournament, they defeated twelfth seeded Syracuse in the first round before losing to fifth seed Virginia Tech in the second round. They were not invited to the NCAA tournament or the WNIT.

== Previous season ==
The Tigers finished the 2020–21 season 12–14 and 5–12 in ACC play to finish in eleventh place. In the ACC tournament, they defeated Notre Dame in the second round before losing to Georgia Tech in the quarterfinals. They received an at-large bid to the WNIT. They defeated Ohio in the first round before losing to Delaware in the second round to end their season.

== Offseason ==
=== Departures ===
Departures
Name	Number	Pos.	Height	Year	Hometown	Reason for departure
Destiny Thomas	1	G	5'10"	Senior	Pelham, GA	Graduated
Kaylee Sticker	2	G	5'11"	Sophomore	Dawsonville, GA	Transferred to Samford
Kendall Spray	3	G	5'5"	(redshirt) Senior	Mount Juliet, TN	Transferred to Florida Gulf Coast
Danae McNeal	22	G	6'0"	Sophomore	Swansea, SC	Transferred to East Carolina
Mikayla Hayes	24	C	6'3"	(redshirt) Junior	Minneapolis, MN	Transferred to Xavier
Shania Meertens	31	G	5'8"	Senior	Winter Springs, FL	Transferred to UCF
Chyna Cotton	32	G	5'10"	Senior	Monroe, GA	Graduated
Nique Cherry	35	F	6'1"	Senior	Laurel, MS	Transferred to Austin Peay
Tylar Bennett	55	C	6'4"	Senior	Redford, MI	Transferred to East Carolina

=== Incoming transfers ===
Incoming transfers
Name	Number	Pos.	Height	Year	Hometown	Previous school
Daisha Bradford	2	G	5'9"	Junior	Mobile, AL	Jones College
Kiara Lewis	23	G	5'8"	Graduate student	Chicago, IL	Syracuse
Latrese Saine	40	C	6'4"	Graduate student	West Memphis, AR	Southeast Missouri State

=== 2021 recruiting class ===
College recruiting
Name	Hometown	School	Height	Weight	Commit date
Kionna Gaines; G	Columbus, Georgia	Carver	5 ft 11 in (1.80 m)	N/A	
Kionna Gaines; G	Recruit ratings: ESPN: (93)				
Makayla Elmore; F	Fostoria, Ohio	Hopewell-Loudon	6 ft 3 in (1.91 m)	N/A	
Makayla Elmore; F	Recruit ratings: ESPN: (90)				
Sydney Standifer; PG	Argyle, Texas	Argyle	5 ft 7 in (1.70 m)	N/A	
Sydney Standifer; PG	Recruit ratings: ESPN: (90)				
Overall recruit ranking:
Note: In many cases, Scout, Rivals, 247Sports, On3, and ESPN may conflict in their listings of height and weight.; In these cases, the average was taken. ESPN grades are on a 100-point scale.; Sources:

== Roster ==
2021–22 Clemson Tigers women's basketball team
Players
Coaches

Pos.	#	Name	Height	Year	Previous school	Hometown
G	00	Delicia Washington	5 ft 10 in (1.78 m)	GS	Baker County; Florida	Macclenny, FL
C	1	Eno Inyang	6 ft 3 in (1.91 m)	Fr	Saint Cloud	St. Cloud, FL
G	2	Daisha Bradford	5 ft 9 in (1.75 m)	Jr	Jones College	Mobile, AL
F	3	Makayla Elmore	6 ft 3 in (1.91 m)	Fr	Hopewell-Loudon	Fostoria, OH
G	4	Weronika Hipp	5 ft 8 in (1.73 m)	So	Eagle's Landing Christian Academy	Ostrów Wielkopolski, Poland
F	5	Amari Robinson	6 ft 0 in (1.83 m)	Jr	Douglas County	Douglasville, GA
G	12	Hannah Hank	6 ft 2 in (1.88 m)	Jr	Forestville	Port Lincoln, Australia
G	15	Kionna Gaines	5 ft 9 in (1.75 m)	Fr	Carver	Columbus, GA
F	21	Skylar Blackstock	5 ft 11 in (1.8 m)	Sr	Wando	Charleston, SC
G	25	Sydney Standifer	5 ft 7 in (1.7 m)	Fr	Argyle	Argyle, TX
G	30	Madi Ott	5 ft 10 in (1.78 m)	Fr	Frisco Centennial	Frisco, TX
C	40	Latrese Saine	6 ft 4 in (1.93 m)	GS	West Memphis; Southeast Missouri State	West Memphis, AR

Head coach

- Amanda Butler (Florida)

Assistant coach(es)

- Joy Smith (Duke)
- Daniel Barber (Florida)
- Priscilla Edwards (St. Bonaventure)

Legend

- (C) Team captain
- (S) Suspended
- (I) Ineligible
- (W) Walk-on
- Injured
- Current redshirt

Roster
Last update: August 4, 2021

=== Mid-season departures ===
Mid-season departures
Name	Number	Pos.	Height	Year	Hometown	Reason for departure
Gabby Elliott	10	G	5'10"	Sophomore	Detroit, Michigan	Entered transfer portal
Kiara Lewis	2	G	5'11"	Graduate student	Dawsonville, GA	Retired from basketball

== Schedule ==
Date time, TV	Rank^{#}	Opponent^{#}	Result	Record	High points	High rebounds	High assists	Site (attendance) city, state
Regular season
November 10, 2021*; 7:00 p.m., ACCNX		USC Upstate	W 64–47	1–0	16 – Bradford	10 – Inyang	2 – Tied	Littlejohn Coliseum (615); Clemson, SC
November 14, 2021*; Noon, ACCNX		Columbia	L 78–82	1–1	20 – Lewis	11 – Lewis	2 – Bradford	Littlejohn Coliseum (545); Clemson, SC
November 17, 2021*; 7:00 p.m., SECN+		at No. 1 South Carolina; Rivalry	L 45–76	1–2	11 – Elliot	5 – Robinson	2 – Robinson	Colonial Life Arena (13,363); Columbia, SC
November 21, 2021*; 2:00 p.m., ACCN		Penn State	W 67–64	2–2	19 – Elliot	12 – Washington	6 – Washington	Littlejohn Coliseum (805); Clemson, SC
November 24, 2021*; 1:00 p.m., ACCNX		North Florida	W 84–72	3–2	23 – Washington	11 – Washington	5 – Lewis	Littlejohn Coliseum (423); Clemson, SC
November 28, 2021*; 2:00 p.m., ACCNX		Mount St. Mary's	W 83–59	4–2	20 – Inyang	9 – Inyang	4 – Tied	Littlejohn Coliseum (436); Clemson, SC
December 2, 2021*; 8:00 p.m., ACCN		Northwestern; ACC–Big Ten Women's Challenge	L 61–72	4–3	18 – Washington	7 – Robinson	4 – Washington	Littlejohn Coliseum (502); Clemson, SC
December 5, 2021*; 2:00 p.m., ACCNX		Presbyterian	W 48–42	5–3	17 – Robinson	12 – Robinson	3 – Tied	Littlejohn Coliseum (577); Clemson, SC
December 11, 2021; 6:00 p.m., ACCN		at Syracuse	L 46–86	5–4 (0–1)	7 – Bradford	7 – Tied	3 – Washington	Carrier Dome (1,009); Syracuse, NY
December 17, 2021*; 7:00 p.m., ACCNX		Wofford	W 84–49	6–4	12 – Elliott	6 – Tied	5 – Washington	Littlejohn Coliseum (1,003); Clemson, SC
December 20, 2021*; 8:00 p.m., FloHoops		vs. No. 21 LSU; West Palm Beach Invitational	L 56–70	6–5	13 – Lewis	10 – Washington	2 – Washington	Student Life Center (1,208); West Palm Beach, FL
December 21, 2021*; 3:30 p.m., FloHoops		vs. Dayton; West Palm Beach Invitational	L 46–60	6–6	12 – Washington	10 – Washington	4 – Lewis	Student Life Center (0); West Palm Beach, FL
December 30, 2021; 7:00 p.m., ACCNX		No. 5 NC State	L 52–79	6–7 (0–2)	14 – Ott	6 – Saine	3 – 3 tied	Littlejohn Coliseum (1,079); Clemson, SC
January 2, 2022; 6:00 p.m., ACCN		at No. 24 North Carolina	L 62–81	6–8 (0–3)	16 – Washington	8 – Hank	5 – Hank	Carmichael Arena (1,443); Chapel Hill, NC
January 6, 2022; 6:00 p.m., ACCN		at Florida State	Postponed due to COVID-19 issues					Donald L. Tucker Center; Tallahassee, FL
January 9, 2022; Noon, ACCRSN		Boston College	L 64–70	6–9 (0–4)	25 – Robinson	8 – Washington	4 – Washington	Littlejohn Coliseum (512); Clemson, SC
January 13, 2022; 7:00 p.m., ACCNX		Miami (FL)	L 60–69	6–10 (0–5)	24 – Washington	6 – Robinson	4 – Bradford	Littlejohn Coliseum (408); Clemson, SC
January 16, 2022; 6:00 p.m., ACCN		at Virginia Tech	Postponed due to inclement weather					Cassell Coliseum; Blacksburg, VA
January 18, 2022; 6:00 p.m., ACCNX		Florida State	L 68–79	6–11 (0–6)	27 – Robinson	8 – Tied	5 – Washington	Littlejohn Coliseum (253); Clemson, SC
January 20, 2022; 7:00 p.m., ACCNX		at Wake Forest	W 66–44	7–11 (1–6)	18 – Washington	8 – Hank	4 – Washington	LJVM Coliseum (1,547); Winston–Salem, NC
January 23, 2022; 2:00 p.m., ACCRSN		at Florida State	L 70–75	7–12 (1–7)	24 – Washington	5 – Hank	4 – Hipp	Donald L. Tucker Center (2,141); Tallahassee, FL
January 27, 2022; 7:00 p.m., ACCNX		Pittsburgh	L 73–78 ^{OT}	7–13 (1–8)	26 – Washington	9 – Washington	3 – 3 tied	Littlejohn Coliseum (373); Clemson, SC
January 30, 2022; 6:00 p.m., ACCN		No. 14 Georgia Tech	L 62–69	7–14 (1–9)	18 – Gaines	5 – Tied	5 – Bradford	Littlejohn Coliseum (893); Clemson, SC
February 3, 2022; 6:00 p.m., ACCRSN		No. 4 Louisville	L 71–93	7–15 (1–10)	28 – Washington	5 – Hank	5 – Bradford	Littlejohn Coliseum (493); Clemson, SC
February 6, 2022; 4:00 p.m., ACCN		at Virginia	W 59–55	8–15 (2–10)	23 – Washington	7 – Tied	4 – Bradford	John Paul Jones Arena (1,798); Charlottesville, VA
February 8, 2022; 6:00 p.m., ACCNX		at Virginia Tech; Rescheduled from Jan. 16	L 42–83	8–16 (2–11)	14 – Robinson	6 – Inyang	3 – Washington	Cassell Coliseum (1,232); Blacksburg, VA
February 10, 2022; 2:00 p.m., ACCN		Wake Forest	W 87–78	9–16 (3–11)	26 – Washington	11 – Robinson	6 – Washington	Littlejohn Coliseum (580); Clemson, SC
February 13, 2022; Noon, ACCRSN		at No. 11 Georgia Tech	L 84–92 ^{OT}	9–17 (3–12)	40 – Washington	5 – Tied	2 – Tied	McCamish Pavilion (2,268); Atlanta, GA
February 20, 2022; 2:00 p.m., ACCNX		Duke	L 61–64	9–18 (3–13)	18 – Washington	12 – Robinson	8 – Washington	Littlejohn Coliseum (1,338); Clemson, SC
February 24, 2022; 8:00 p.m., ACCN		at No. 14 Notre Dame	L 56–77	9–19 (3–14)	18 – Robinson	10 – Hank	4 – Bradford	Purcell Pavilion (3,641); Notre Dame, IN
February 27, 2022; 4:30 p.m., ACCRSN		at Miami (FL)	L 40–76	9–20 (3–15)	13 – Bradford	5 – Tied	5 – Washington	Watsco Center; Coral Gables, FL
ACC Women's Tournament
March 2, 2022; 1:00 p.m., ACCRSN	(13)	vs. (12) Syracuse; First Round	W 88–69	10–20	33 – Washington	11 – Washington	7 – Bradford	Greensboro Coliseum (6,319); Greensboro, NC
March 3, 2022; 11:00 a.m., ACCRSN	(13)	vs. (5) No. 21 Virginia Tech; Second Round	L 60–82	10–21	19 – Washington	5 – Tied	4 – Bradford	Greensboro Coliseum (5,648); Greensboro, NC
*Non-conference game. ^{#}Rankings from AP Poll. (#) Tournament seedings in parentheses. All times are in Eastern.

== Rankings ==
Regular season polls
Poll	Pre- season	Week 2	Week 3	Week 4	Week 5	Week 6	Week 7	Week 8	Week 9	Week 10	Week 11	Week 12	Week 13	Week 14	Week 15	Week 16	Week 17	Week 18	Final
AP																			
Coaches																			

Legend
	Increase in ranking
	Decrease in ranking
	Not ranked previous week
(RV)	Received votes

== See also ==
- 2021–22 Clemson Tigers men's basketball team
