= 2021–22 Virginia Cavaliers women's basketball team =

Intercollegiate basketball season

2021–22 Virginia Cavaliers women's basketball
- Conference: Atlantic Coast Conference
- Record: 5–22 (2–16 ACC)
- Head coach: Tina Thompson (4th season)
- Assistant coaches: Karleen Thompson; Walter Pitts; James Posey
- Home arena: John Paul Jones Arena

2021–22 ACC women's basketball standings
	Conf.				Overall
Team	W		L	PCT	W		L	PCT
No. 3 NC State †	17	–	1	.944	32	–	4	.889
No. 4 Louisville	16	–	2	.889	29	–	5	.853
No. 17 North Carolina	13	–	5	.722	25	–	7	.781
No. 21 Notre Dame	13	–	5	.722	24	–	9	.727
No. 16 Virginia Tech	13	–	5	.722	23	–	10	.697
Georgia Tech	11	–	7	.611	21	–	11	.656
Boston College	10	–	8	.556	21	–	12	.636
Miami (FL)	10	–	8	.556	21	–	13	.618
Florida State	10	–	8	.556	17	–	14	.548
Duke	7	–	11	.389	17	–	13	.567
Wake Forest	4	–	14	.222	16	–	17	.485
Syracuse	4	–	14	.222	11	–	18	.379
Clemson	3	–	15	.167	10	–	21	.323
Pittsburgh	2	–	16	.111	11	–	19	.367
Virginia	2	–	16	.111	5	–	22	.185
† 2022 ACC tournament winner Rankings from AP poll

The 2021–22 Virginia Cavaliers women's basketball team represented the University of Virginia during the 2021–22 NCAA Division I women's basketball season. The Cavaliers were led by fourth year head coach Tina Thompson, and played their home games at John Paul Jones Arena as members the Atlantic Coast Conference.

The Cavaliers finished the season 5–22 and 2–16 in ACC play to finish in a tie for fourteenth place. As the fourteenth seed in the ACC tournament they lost their First Round matchup with Wake Forest. They were not invited to the NCAA tournament or WNIT. After the season, Virginia announced that Head Coach Tina Thompson had been relieved of her duties after going 30–63 during her tenure.

== Previous season ==
On January 14, 2021, it was announced that the team would end their season due to COVID-19 concerns. Virginia was the second team in the Atlantic Coast Conference to suspend their season, after Duke did so on December 25, 2020.

The Cavaliers finished the season 0–5, and 0–2 in ACC play. Due to their season cancellation they did not participate in the ACC tournament, NCAA tournament or WNIT.

== Offseason ==
=== Departures ===
Departures
Name	Number	Pos.	Height	Year	Hometown	Reason for departure
Dylan Horton	0	G	5'9"	Sophomore	Los Angeles, California	Transferred to Florida A&M
Zaria Johnson	4	G	6'0"	Freshman	Houston, Texas	–
Dani Lawson	21	G	6'2"	Junior	Cleveland, Ohio	Graduated
Emily Maupin	35	F	6'3"	Graduate Student	Charlottesville, Virginia	Graduated

=== Incoming transfers ===
Incoming transfers
Name	Number	Pos.	Height	Year	Hometown	Previous school
Taylor Valladay	2	G	5'7"	Junior	Chicago, Illinois	Marquette
Camryn Taylor	20	F	6'2"	Junior	Peoria, Illinois	Marquette
Eleah Parker	21	F	6'4"	Graduate Student	Charlotte, North Carolina	Penn
McKenna Dale	44	G	6'0"	Graduate Student	Storrs, Connecticut	Brown

=== Recruiting class ===
College recruiting
Name	Hometown	School	Height	Weight	Commit date
Annaliese Griffin; F	Joliet, Illinois	Aurora Christian	6 ft 1 in (1.85 m)	N/A	
Annaliese Griffin; F	Recruit ratings: No ratings found				
Overall recruit ranking:
Note: In many cases, Scout, Rivals, 247Sports, On3, and ESPN may conflict in their listings of height and weight.; In these cases, the average was taken. ESPN grades are on a 100-point scale.; Sources:

== Roster ==
2021–22 Virginia Cavaliers women's basketball team
Players
Coaches

Pos.	#	Name	Height	Year	Previous school	Hometown
G	1	Carole Miller	6 ft 0 in (1.83 m)	Jr	Thomas Edison	Alexandria, VA
G	2	Taylor Valladay	5 ft 7 in (1.7 m)	Jr	Rich South; Marquette	Chicago, IL
G	3	Aaliyah Pitts	6 ft 0 in (1.83 m)	So	Bishop McNamara	Suitland, MD
F	5	Tihana Stojsavljevic	6 ft 3 in (1.91 m)	GS	Tresnjevka; Texas Tech	Zagreb, Croatia
F	12	Meg Jefferson	6 ft 3 in (1.91 m)	Jr	St Columba's Catholic College	Sydney, Australia
F	13	Deja Bristol	6 ft 1 in (1.85 m)	So	New Hope Academy	Upper Marlboro, MD
G	14	Kaydan Lawson	6 ft 0 in (1.83 m)	So	Orange	Cleveland, OH
G	15	AnnaLiese Griffin	6 ft 1 in (1.85 m)	Fr	Aurora Christian	Joliet, IL
F	20	Camryn Taylor	6 ft 2 in (1.88 m)	Jr	Richwoods; Marquette	Peoria, IL
F	21	Eleah Parker	6 ft 4 in (1.93 m)	GS	Northside Christian Academy; Penn	Charlotte, NC
G	23	Amandine Toi	5 ft 10 in (1.78 m)	GS	INSEP Academy	Paris, France
F	32	Nycerra Minnis	6 ft 3 in (1.91 m)	So	Herndon	Riverdale, MD
F	34	London Clarkson	6 ft 2 in (1.88 m)	Jr	Pflugerville; Florida State	Pflugerville, TX
G	44	McKenna Dale	6 ft 0 in (1.83 m)	GS	Edwin O. Smith; Brown	Storrs, CT

Head coach

- Tina Thompson (USC)

Assistant coach(es)

- Karleen Thompson (USC)
- Walter Pitts (Alabama)
- James Posey (Xavier)

Legend

- (C) Team captain
- (S) Suspended
- (I) Ineligible
- (W) Walk-on
- Injured
- Current redshirt

Roster
Last update: November 8, 2021

== Schedule ==
Date time, TV	Rank^{#}	Opponent^{#}	Result	Record	Site (attendance) city, state
Regular season
November 9, 2021*; 7:00 p.m., FloSports		at James Madison	L 69–84	0–1	Atlantic Union Bank Center (3,766); Harrisonburg, VA
November 14, 2021*; 1:00 p.m., ACCNX		USC	L 48–65	0–2	John Paul Jones Arena (1,385); Charlottesville, VA
November 17, 2021*; 7:00 p.m., ACCNX		UCF	L 38–59	0–3	John Paul Jones Arena (1,432); Charlottesville, VA
November 21, 2021*; 6:00 p.m., P12N		at No. 20 UCLA	L 57–69	0–4	Pauley Pavilion (1,077); Los Angeles, CA
November 23, 2021*; 9:00 p.m., ESPN+		at Cal State Fullerton	W 60–48	1–4	Titan Gym (283); Fullerton, CA
November 26, 2021*; Noon, ACCNX		Rhode Island; Cavalier Classic	L 70–80	1–5	John Paul Jones Arena (1,498); Charlottesville, VA
November 28, 2021*; 3:30 p.m., ACCN		Richmond; Cavalier Classic	L 65–74	1–6	John Paul Jones Arena (1,670); Charlottesville, VA
December 2, 2021*; 7:00 p.m., ACCNX		William & Mary	W 60–44	2–6	John Paul Jones Arena (1,555); Charlottesville, VA
December 5, 2021*; 2:00 p.m., ESPN+		at George Washington	W 62–53	3–6	Charles E. Smith Center (364); Washington, D.C.
December 7, 2021*; 7:00 p.m., ACCNX		American	L 56–69	3–7	John Paul Jones Arena (1,441); Charlottesville, VA
December 19, 2021; 4:00 p.m., ACCN		at No. 2 NC State	L 55–82	3–8 (0–1)	Reynolds Coliseum (4,564); Raleigh, NC
December 22, 2021*; 1:00 p.m.		at Texas Southern	Canceled due to COVID-19 issues		H&PE Arena; Houston, TX
December 30, 2021; 7:00 p.m., ACCNX		No. 17 Notre Dame	Postponed due to COVID-19 issues		John Paul Jones Arena; Charlottesville, VA
January 2, 2022; 2:00 p.m., ACCN		Miami (FL)	Postponed due to COVID-19 issues		John Paul Jones Arena; Charlottesville, VA
January 6, 2022; 7:00 p.m., ACCNX		at Virginia Tech; Commonwealth Clash	Postponed due to COVID-19 issues		Cassell Coliseum; Blacksburg, VA
January 9, 2022; 4:00 p.m., ACCN		at No. 16 Georgia Tech	L 31–67	3–9 (0–2)	McCamish Pavilion (1,841); Atlanta, GA
January 13, 2022; 7:00 p.m., ACCNX		No. 4 NC State	L 43–66	3–10 (0–3)	John Paul Jones Arena (1,969); Charlottesville, VA
January 16, 2022; 1:00 p.m., ACCNX		Syracuse	Postponed due to inclement weather		John Paul Jones Arena; Charlottesville, VA
January 18, 2022; 5:00 p.m., ACCN		at Virginia Tech; Commonwealth Clash; Rescheduled from Jan 6, 2022	L 52–69	3–11 (0–4)	Cassell Coliseum (1,518); Blacksburg, VA
January 20, 2022; 6:00 p.m., ACCNX		at No. 20 North Carolina	L 52–61	3–12 (0–5)	Carmichael Arena (1,513); Chapel Hill, NC
January 23, 2022; 6:00 p.m., ACCN		at No. 21 Duke	L 48–57	3–13 (0–6)	Cameron Indoor Stadium (2,126); Durham, NC
January 25, 2022; 6:00 p.m., ACCNX		No. 20 Notre Dame; Rescheduled from Dec 30, 2021	Postponed, Forfeited		John Paul Jones Arena; Charlottesville, VA
January 27, 2022; 7:00 p.m., ACCNX		Virginia Tech; Commonwealth Clash	L 42–71	3–14 (0–8)	John Paul Jones Arena (1,779); Charlottesville, VA
January 30, 2022; Noon, ACCRSN		at Florida State	L 37–62	3–15 (0–9)	Donald L. Tucker Center (2,144); Tallahassee, FL
February 3, 2022; 7:00 p.m., ACCNX		at Boston College	L 57–65	3–16 (0–10)	Conte Forum (736); Chestnut Hill, MA
February 6, 2022; 4:00 p.m., ACCN		Clemson	L 55–59	3–17 (0–11)	John Paul Jones Arena (1,798); Charlottesville, VA
February 8, 2022; 6:00 p.m., ACCNX		Syracuse; Rescheduled from Jan. 16, 2022	L 70–77	3–18 (0–12)	John Paul Jones Arena (1,556); Charlottesville, VA
February 10, 2022; 7:00 p.m., ACCNX		at No. 3 Louisville	Forfeited to Louisville due to travel issues.		KFC Yum! Center; Louisville, KY
February 13, 2022; 4:00 p.m., ACCN		at Wake Forest	L 53–68	3–19 (0–14)	LJVM Coliseum (1,994); Winston–Salem, NC
February 15, 2022; 6:00 p.m., ACCNX		Miami (FL)	L 55–71	3–20 (0–15)	John Paul Jones Arena (1,478); Charlottesville, VA
February 17, 2022; 7:00 p.m., ACCNX		Duke	W 67–54	4–20 (1–15)	John Paul Jones Arena (1,695); Charlottesville, VA
February 20, 2022; 4:00 p.m., ACCN		Pittsburgh	W 74–65	5–20 (2–15)	John Paul Jones Arena (1,872); Charlottesville, VA
February 24, 2022; 7:00 p.m., ACCNX		No. 18 North Carolina	L 57–68	5–21 (2–16)	John Paul Jones Arena (1,879); Charlottesville, VA
ACC Women's Tournament
March 2, 2022; 6:30 p.m., ACCRSN	(14)	vs. (11) Wake Forest; First Round	L 53–61	5–22	Greensboro Coliseum (3,618); Greensboro, NC
*Non-conference game. ^{#}Rankings from AP Poll. (#) Tournament seedings in parentheses. All times are in Eastern.

== Rankings ==
Regular season polls
Poll	Pre- Season	Week 2	Week 3	Week 4	Week 5	Week 6	Week 7	Week 8	Week 9	Week 10	Week 11	Week 12	Week 13	Week 14	Week 15	Week 16	Week 17	Week 18	Final
AP																			
Coaches	RV																		

Legend
	Increase in ranking
	Decrease in ranking
	Not ranked previous week
(RV)	Received Votes

== See also ==
- 2021–22 Virginia Cavaliers men's basketball team
