= 2021–22 Miami Hurricanes women's basketball team =

Intercollegiate basketball season

2021–22 Miami Hurricanes women's basketball

NCAA tournament, second round
- Conference: Atlantic Coast Conference
- Record: 21–13 (10–8 ACC)
- Head coach: Katie Meier (17th season)
- Assistant coaches: Fitzroy Anthony; Beth Dunkenberger; Shenise Johnson
- Home arena: Watsco Center

2021–22 ACC women's basketball standings
	Conf.				Overall
Team	W		L	PCT	W		L	PCT
No. 3 NC State †	17	–	1	.944	32	–	4	.889
No. 4 Louisville	16	–	2	.889	29	–	5	.853
No. 17 North Carolina	13	–	5	.722	25	–	7	.781
No. 21 Notre Dame	13	–	5	.722	24	–	9	.727
No. 16 Virginia Tech	13	–	5	.722	23	–	10	.697
Georgia Tech	11	–	7	.611	21	–	11	.656
Boston College	10	–	8	.556	21	–	12	.636
Miami (FL)	10	–	8	.556	21	–	13	.618
Florida State	10	–	8	.556	17	–	14	.548
Duke	7	–	11	.389	17	–	13	.567
Wake Forest	4	–	14	.222	16	–	17	.485
Syracuse	4	–	14	.222	11	–	18	.379
Clemson	3	–	15	.167	10	–	21	.323
Pittsburgh	2	–	16	.111	11	–	19	.367
Virginia	2	–	16	.111	5	–	22	.185
† 2022 ACC tournament winner Rankings from AP poll

The 2021–22 Miami Hurricanes women's basketball team represented the University of Miami during the 2021–22 NCAA Division I women's basketball season. The Hurricanes were led by seventeenth-year head coach Katie Meier and played their home games at the Watsco Center as members of the Atlantic Coast Conference.

The Hurricanes finished the season 21–13 overall and 10–8 in ACC play to finish in a tie for seventh place. As the seventh seed in the ACC tournament, they defeated tenth seed Duke in the second round, second seeded Louisville in the quarterfinals, and third seed Notre Dame in the semifinals before losing to NC State in the final. They received an at-large bid to the NCAA tournament where they were the eighth seed in the Greensboro Regional. They defeated ninth seed South Florida in the first round before losing to top seed South Carolina in the second round to end their season.

== Previous season ==
The Hurricanes finished the season 11–11 and 8–10 in ACC play to finish in a tie for ninth place. As the tenth seed in the ACC tournament, they lost to Virginia Tech in the second round. They were not invited to the NCAA tournament or the WNIT.

== Off-season ==
=== Departures ===
Departures
Name	Number	Pos.	Height	Year	Hometown	Reason for Departure
Endia Banks	4	G	5'9"	Senior	Duluth, Georgia	Transferred to Mercer
Taylor Mason	13	G	5'9"	Senior	Decatur, Georgia	Graduated
Nyayongah Gony	14	G/F	6'2"	Freshman	Lincoln, Nebraska	Transferred
Jamir Huston	15	F	6'0"	Junior	Cleveland, Ohio	Transferred to ETSU
Brianna Jackson	21	F	6'3"	Sophomore	Virginia Beach, Virginia	Transferred to Old Dominion
Sydnee Roby	44	C	6'3"	Freshman	Milwaukee, Wisconsin	Transferred to Texas A&M

=== Incoming transfers ===
Incoming transfers
Name	Number	Pos.	Height	Year	Hometown	Previous School
Lola Pendande	21	F	6'4"	Junior	Almeria, Spain	Utah
Maeva Djaldi-Tabdi	33	F	6'4"	(redshirt) Senior	Paris, France	Syracuse

=== Recruiting class ===
College recruiting information
Name	Hometown	School	Height	Weight	Commit date
Lashae Dwyer; PG	Toronto, Canada	Webb School	5 ft 8 in (1.73 m)	N/A	
Lashae Dwyer; PG	Recruit ratings: ESPN: (91)				
Overall recruit ranking:
Note: In many cases, Scout, Rivals, 247Sports, On3, and ESPN may conflict in their listings of height and weight.; In these cases, the average was taken. ESPN grades are on a 100-point scale.; Sources:

== Roster ==
2021–22 Miami Hurricanes women's basketball team
Players
Coaches

Pos.	#	Name	Height	Year	Previous school	Hometown
G	0	Kenza Salgues	5 ft 9 in (1.75 m)	Jr	INSEP	Montpellier, FR
G/F	1	Moulayna Sidi Baba	6 ft 0 in (1.83 m)	Jr	Solna Gymnasium	Stockholm, Sweden
F	3	Destiny Harden	6 ft 0 in (1.83 m)	RS Sr	Morgan Park; West Virginia	Chicago, IL
G	4	Jasmyne Roberts	5 ft 10 in (1.78 m)	Fr	Bishop Kenny	Jacksonville, FL
G	5	Mykea Gray	5 ft 4 in (1.63 m)	Sr	National Christian Academy	Upper Marlboro, MD
G	12	Ja'Leah Williams	5 ft 9 in (1.75 m)	Fr	Blanche Ely	Pompano Beach, FL
G	13	Lashae Dwyer	5 ft 8 in (1.73 m)	Fr	Webb School	Toronto, Canada
G	20	Kelsey Marshall	5 ft 9 in (1.75 m)	GS	Miami Country Day School	Davie, FL
F	21	Lola Pendande	6 ft 4 in (1.93 m)	Jr	Ribét Academy; Utah	Almeria, Spain
F	22	Chiso Okafor	6 ft 1 in (1.85 m)	Fr	IES Llavaneres	Mataró, Spain
F	23	Paula Fraile Ruiz	6 ft 4 in (1.93 m)	So	Institut Joaquim Blume	Barcelona, Spain
G	25	Karla Erjavec	5 ft 10 in (1.78 m)	Sr	Sport Gymnasium; Wyoming	Zagreb, Croatia
F	33	Maeva Djaldi–Tabdi	6 ft 4 in (1.93 m)	RS Sr	Jean Moulin; Syracuse	Paris, France
F	35	Naomi Mbandu	6 ft 2 in (1.88 m)	Sr	INSEP; Gulf Coast State	Tarbes, France

Head coach

- Katie Meier (Duke)

Assistant coach(es)

- Fitzroy Anthony (Palm Beach Atlantic)
- Beth Dunkenberger (Randolph–Macon)
- Shenise Johnson (Miami (FL))

Legend

- (C) Team captain
- (S) Suspended
- (I) Ineligible
- (W) Walk-on
- Injured
- Current redshirt

Roster

== Schedule ==
Date time, TV	Rank^{#}	Opponent^{#}	Result	Record	Site (attendance) city, state
Regular season
November 9, 2021*; 4:00 p.m., ACCNX		Jackson State	W 72–67	1–0	Watsco Center (1,102); Coral Gables, FL
November 12, 2021*; 7:00 p.m., ACCNX		Bethune–Cookman	W 55–43	2–0	Watsco Center (1,128); Coral Gables, FL
November 14, 2021*; 2:00 p.m., ACCNX		Stetson	W 54–39	3–0	Watsco Center (1,006); Coral Gables, FL
November 18, 2021*; 6:00 p.m., ACCNX		Florida Atlantic	W 56–46	4–0	Watsco Center (1,087); Coral Gables, FL
November 25, 2021*; 4:00 p.m.		vs. Washington State; Baha Mar Hoops	L 47–62	4–1	Kendal Isaacs National Gymnasium (0); Nassau, Bahamas
November 27, 2021*; 8:30 p.m.		vs. No. 4 Indiana; Baha Mar Hoops	L 51–53	4–2	Kendal Isaacs National Gymnasium (0); Nassau, Bahamas
December 2, 2021*; 8:00 p.m., BTN		at No. 8 Maryland; ACC–Big Ten Challenge	L 74–82	4–3	Xfinity Center (4,367); College Park, MD
December 5, 2021*; 2:00 p.m., ACCNX		Tulane; Miami Holiday Classic	W 70–63	5–3	Watsco Center (1,246); Coral Gables, FL
December 6, 2021*; 1:00 p.m., ACCNX		Arkansas-Pine Bluff; Miami Holiday Classic	W 70–63	6–3	Watsco Center (1,246); Coral Gables, FL
December 12, 2021*; 1:00 p.m., ACCNX		Robert Morris	W 86–45	7–3	Watsco Center (1,609); Coral Gables, FL
December 19, 2021; Noon, ACCN		No. 15 Duke	Postponed due to COVID-19 issues		Watsco Center; Coral Gables, FL
December 21, 2021*; 3:00 p.m., ACCNX		North Florida	Canceled due to COVID-19 issues		Watsco Center; Coral Gables, FL
January 2, 2022; 2:00 p.m., ACCN		at Virginia	Postponed due to COVID-19 issues		John Paul Jones Arena; Charlottesville, VA
January 6, 2022; 7:00 p.m., ACCNX		Wake Forest	L 46–47	7–4 (0–1)	Watsco Center (1,135); Coral Gables, FL
January 9, 2022; Noon, ACCN		No. 3 Louisville	Postponed due to COVID-19 issues		Watsco Center; Coral Gables, FL
January 9, 2022; 2:00 p.m., ACCN		No. 5 NC State	L 64–76	7–5 (0–2)	Watsco Center (1,873); Coral Gables, FL
January 13, 2022; 7:00 p.m., ACCNX		at Clemson	W 69–60	8–5 (1–2)	Littlejohn Coliseum (408); Clemson, SC
January 16, 2022; 2:00 p.m., ACCN		No. 15 Georgia Tech	W 46–45	9–5 (2–2)	Watsco Center (1,256); Coral Gables, FL
January 18, 2022; 2:00 p.m., ACCN		No. 21 Duke; Rescheduled from Dec. 19, 2021	L 49–58	9–6 (2–3)	Watsco Center (1,443); Coral Gables, FL
January 20, 2022; 8:00 p.m., ACCRSN		at Florida State; Rivalry	W 59–52	10–6 (3–3)	Donald L. Tucker Center (2,190); Tallahassee, FL
January 23, 2022; Noon, ACCRSN		at Boston College	L 66–79	10–7 (3–4)	Conte Forum (914); Chestnut Hill, MA
January 27, 2022; 7:00 p.m., ACCRSN		at Wake Forest	W 66–59	11–7 (4–4)	LJVM Coliseum (1,690); Winston–Salem, NC
February 1, 2022; 7:00 p.m., ACCNX		No. 4 Louisville; Rescheduled from Jan 9, 2022	L 66–69	11–8 (4–5)	Watsco Center; Coral Gables, FL
February 3, 2022; 7:00 p.m., ACCNX		Syracuse	W 71–65	12–8 (5–5)	Watsco Center; Coral Gables, FL
February 6, 2022; Noon, ACCN		at No. 24 North Carolina	L 38–85	12–9 (5–6)	Carmichael Arena (2,759); Chapel Hill, NC
February 10, 2022; 6:00 p.m., ACCRSN		at No. 18 Notre Dame	L 53–69	12–10 (5–7)	Purcell Pavilion (4,906); Notre Dame, IN
February 13, 2022; Noon, ACCN		Florida State; Rivalry	W 76–59	13–10 (6–7)	Watsco Center (2,034); Coral Gables, FL
February 15, 2022; 6:00 p.m., ACCNX		at Virginia	W 71–55	14–10 (7–7)	John Paul Jones Arena (1,478); Charlottesville, VA
February 17, 2022; 6:00 p.m., ACCN		Pittsburgh	W 60–50	15–10 (8–7)	Watsco Center (1,298); Coral Gables, FL
February 20, 2022; 2:00 p.m., ACCNX		at No. 16 Georgia Tech	W 51–39	16–10 (9–7)	McCamish Pavilion (2,038); Atlanta, GA
February 24, 2022; 6:00 p.m., ACCRSN		at No. 23 Virginia Tech	L 63–70	16–11 (9–8)	Cassell Coliseum (1,522); Blacksburg, VA
February 27, 2022; 4:30 p.m., ACCRSN		Clemson	W 76–40	17–11 (10–8)	Watsco Center; Coral Gables, FL
ACC Women's Tournament
March 3, 2022; 6:00 p.m., ACCRSN	(7)	vs. (10) Duke; Second Round	W 61–55	18–11	Greensboro Coliseum (5,648); Greensboro, NC
March 4, 2022; 6:00 p.m., ACCRSN	(7)	vs. (2) No. 4 Louisville; Quarterfinals	W 61–59	19–11	Greensboro Coliseum (5,682); Greensboro, NC
March 5, 2022; 2:30 p.m., ACCN	(7)	vs. (3) No. 20 Notre Dame; Semifinals	W 57–54	20–11	Greensboro Coliseum (7,923); Greensboro, NC
March 5, 2022; Noon, ESPN	(7)	vs. (1) No. 3 NC State; Final	L 47–60	20–12	Greensboro Coliseum (9,253); Greensboro, NC
NCAA Women's Tournament
March 18, 2022*; 11:30 am, ESPN2	(8 G)	vs. (9 G) South Florida; First Round	W 78–66	21–12	Colonial Life Arena; Columbia, SC
March 20, 2022*; 3:00 pm, ABC	(8 G)	at (1 G) No. 1 South Carolina; Second Round	L 33–49	21–13	Colonial Life Arena (9,817); Columbia, SC
*Non-conference game. ^{#}Rankings from AP Poll. (#) Tournament seedings in parentheses. G=Greensboro. All times are in Eastern.

== Rankings ==
Regular season polls
Poll	Pre- Season	Week 2	Week 3	Week 4	Week 5	Week 6	Week 7	Week 8	Week 9	Week 10	Week 11	Week 12	Week 13	Week 14	Week 15	Week 16	Week 17	Week 18	Final
AP																		RV	RV
Coaches																			

Legend
	Increase in ranking
	Decrease in ranking
	Not ranked previous week
(RV)	Received Votes

The Coaches Poll releases a final poll after the NCAA tournament, but the AP Poll does not release a poll at this time. The Coaches Poll does not release a week 2 poll.
