= 2021–22 Notre Dame Fighting Irish women's basketball team =

Intercollegiate basketball season

2021–22 Notre Dame Fighting Irish women's basketball

NCAA tournament, Sweet Sixteen
- Conference: Atlantic Coast Conference

Ranking
- Coaches: No. 17
- AP: No. 21
- Record: 24–10 (13–5 ACC)
- Head coach: Niele Ivey (2nd season)
- Associate head coach: Carol Owens (22nd season)
- Assistant coaches: Coquese Washington (2nd season); Michaela Mabrey (3rd season)
- Home arena: Purcell Pavilion

2021–22 ACC women's basketball standings
	Conf.				Overall
Team	W		L	PCT	W		L	PCT
No. 3 NC State †	17	–	1	.944	32	–	4	.889
No. 4 Louisville	16	–	2	.889	29	–	5	.853
No. 17 North Carolina	13	–	5	.722	25	–	7	.781
No. 21 Notre Dame	13	–	5	.722	24	–	9	.727
No. 16 Virginia Tech	13	–	5	.722	23	–	10	.697
Georgia Tech	11	–	7	.611	21	–	11	.656
Boston College	10	–	8	.556	21	–	12	.636
Miami (FL)	10	–	8	.556	21	–	13	.618
Florida State	10	–	8	.556	17	–	14	.548
Duke	7	–	11	.389	17	–	13	.567
Wake Forest	4	–	14	.222	16	–	17	.485
Syracuse	4	–	14	.222	11	–	18	.379
Clemson	3	–	15	.167	10	–	21	.323
Pittsburgh	2	–	16	.111	11	–	19	.367
Virginia	2	–	16	.111	5	–	22	.185
† 2022 ACC tournament winner Rankings from AP poll

The 2021–22 Notre Dame Fighting Irish women's basketball team represented the University of Notre Dame during the 2021–22 NCAA Division I women's basketball season. The Fighting Irish were led by second-year head coach Niele Ivey and played their home games at Purcell Pavilion as members of the Atlantic Coast Conference.

The Fighting Irish finished the season 24–10 overall and 13–5 in ACC play, to finish in a three-way tie for third place. As the third seed in the ACC tournament, they defeated sixth seed Georgia Tech in the quarterfinals before losing to seventh seed Miami in the semifinals. They received an at-large bid to the NCAA tournament and were the fifth seed in the Bridgeport Region. They defeated twelfth seed UMass in the first round and fourth seed Oklahoma in the second round before losing to NC State in the Sweet Sixteen to end their season.

== Previous season ==
The Fighting Irish finished the season 10–10 and 8–7 in ACC play to finish in sixth place. In the ACC tournament, they lost to Clemson in the second round. They were not invited to the NCAA tournament or the WNIT.

== Offseason ==
=== Departures ===
Departures
Name	Number	Pos.	Height	Year	Hometown	Reason for departure
Amirah Abdur-Rahim	3	F	6'3"	Freshman	Marietta, Georgia	Transferred to SMU
Alasia Hayes	5	G	5'7"	Freshman	Murfreesboro, Tennessee	Transferred to Mississippi State
Nicole Benz	20	G	5'8"	Senior	Santa Clarita, California	Graduated
Danielle Cosgrove	22	F	6'4"	Junior	Holbrook, New York	Transferred to St. John's
Alli Campbell	23	G	6'0"	Freshman	Altoona, Pennsylvania	Transferred to Penn State
Destinee Walker	24	G	5'10"	Graduate student	Orlando, Florida	Graduated
Mikayla Vaughn	30	C	6'3"	Senior	Philadelphia, Pennsylvania	Graduated

=== Incoming transfers ===
Incoming transfers
Name	Number	Pos.	Height	Year	Hometown	Previous school
Maya Dodson	0	F	6'3"	Graduate student	Alpharetta, Georgia	Stanford

=== 2021 recruiting class ===
College recruiting
Name	Hometown	School	Height	Weight	Commit date
Olivia Miles; PG	Phillipsburg, New Jersey	Blair Academy	5 ft 10 in (1.78 m)	N/A	
Olivia Miles; PG	Recruit ratings: ESPN: (97)				
Sonia Citron; G	Scarsdale, New York	The Ursuline School	6 ft 1 in (1.85 m)	N/A	
Sonia Citron; G	Recruit ratings: ESPN: (95)				
Overall recruit ranking:
Note: In many cases, Scout, Rivals, 247Sports, On3, and ESPN may conflict in their listings of height and weight.; In these cases, the average was taken. ESPN grades are on a 100-point scale.; Sources:

== Roster ==
2021–22 Notre Dame Fighting Irish women's basketball team
Players
Coaches

Pos.	#	Name	Height	Year	Previous school	Hometown
F	0	Maya Dodson	6 ft 3 in (1.91 m)	GS	St. Francis; Stanford	Alpharetta, GA
G	1	Dara Mabrey	5 ft 7 in (1.7 m)	Sr	Manasquan; Virginia Tech	Belmar, NJ
G	3	Trinity Cha	5 ft 5 in (1.65 m)	So	Crean Lutheran	Irvine, CA
G	5	Olivia Miles	5 ft 10 in (1.78 m)	Fr	Blair Academy	Phillipsburg, NJ
G	10	Katlyn Gilbert	5 ft 10 in (1.78 m)	Sr	Heritage Christian	Indianapolis, IN
G	11	Sonia Citron	6 ft 1 in (1.85 m)	Fr	The Ursuline School	Scarsdale, NY
G	12	Abby Prohaska	5 ft 10 in (1.78 m)	Sr	Lakota West	Liberty Township, OH
F	15	Natalija Marshall	6 ft 5 in (1.96 m)	So	Christ the King	Queens, NY
G	21	Anaya Peoples	5 ft 10 in (1.78 m)	Jr	Schlarman Academy	Danville, IL
G	25	Sarah Cernugel	5 ft 4 in (1.63 m)	So	Hinsdale Central	Westmont, IL
F	33	Sam Brunelle	6 ft 2 in (1.88 m)	Jr	William Monroe High School	Ruckersville, VA
F	34	Maddy Westbeld	6 ft 3 in (1.91 m)	So	Fairmont	Kettering, OH

Head coach

- Niele Ivey (Notre Dame)

Assistant coach(es)

- Carol Owens (Northern Illinois)
- Coquese Washington (Notre Dame)
- Michaela Mabrey (Notre Dame)

Legend

- (C) Team captain
- (S) Suspended
- (I) Ineligible
- (W) Walk-on
- Injured
- Current redshirt

Roster
Last update: November 4, 2021

== Schedule and results ==
Date time, TV	Rank^{#}	Opponent^{#}	Result	Record	Site (attendance) city, state
Exhibition
November 1, 2021*; 7:00 p.m.		Emporia State	W 104–46	–	Purcell Pavilion (0); Notre Dame, IN
Regular season
November 9, 2021*; 7:00 p.m., ACCNX		Ohio	W 105–69	1–0	Purcell Pavilion (4,553); Notre Dame, IN
November 11, 2021*; 7:00 p.m., ACCNX		Western Illinois	W 76–50	2–0	Purcell Pavilion (4,121); Notre Dame, IN
November 14, 2021; Noon, ACCN		at Syracuse	W 82–56	3–0 (1–0)	Carrier Dome (3,345); Syracuse, NY
November 18, 2021*; 7:00 p.m., ACCNX		Fordham	W 71–56	4–0	Purcell Pavilion (4,487); Notre Dame, IN
November 21, 2021*; 5:00 p.m., ACCNX		Bryant	W 94–35	5–0	Purcell Pavilion (4,470); Notre Dame, IN
November 26, 2021*; 4:30 p.m., FloHoops		vs. Georgia; Daytona Beach Invitational	L 67–71 ^{OT}	5–1	Ocean Center (0); Daytona Beach, FL
November 27, 2021*; 7:00 p.m., FloHoops		vs. No. 16 Oregon State; Daytona Beach Invitational	W 64–62	6–1	Ocean Center (0); Daytona Beach, FL
December 2, 2021*; 6:00 p.m., BTN	No. 24	at Michigan State; ACC–Big Ten Women's Challenge	W 76–71	7–1	Breslin Center (4,581); East Lansing, MI
December 5, 2021*; Noon, FS1	No. 24	at No. 2т Connecticut	L 54–73	7–2	Gampel Pavilion (10,167); Storrs, CT
December 8, 2021*; 7:00 p.m., ESPN+	No. 22	at Valparaiso	W 73–56	8–2	Athletics–Recreation Center (1,550); Valparaiso, IN
December 12, 2021*; 2:00 p.m., ACCNX	No. 22	Purdue-Fort Wayne	W 78–41	9–2	Purcell Pavilion (5,591); Notre Dame, IN
December 19, 2021; 2:00 p.m., ACCN	No. 21	Pittsburgh	W 85–59	10–2 (2–0)	Purcell Pavilion (4,983); Notre Dame, IN
December 22, 2021*; 8:30 p.m., FS1	No. 20	at DePaul	W 91–86	11–2	Wintrust Arena (1,904); Chicago, IL
December 30, 2021; 7:00 p.m., ACCNX	No. 17	at Virginia	Postponed due to COVID-19 Issues		John Paul Jones Arena; Charlottesville, VA
January 2, 2022; 2:00 p.m., ACCN	No. 17	at No. 15 Duke	L 70–72	11–3 (2–1)	Cameron Indoor Stadium (3,354); Durham, NC
January 9, 2022; 2:00 p.m., ACCN	No. 20	No. 5 NC State	Postponed due to COVID-19 Issues		Purcell Pavilion; Notre Dame, IN
January 13, 2022; 7:00 p.m., ACCNX	No. 20	at Wake Forest	W 74–64	12–3 (3–1)	LJVM Coliseum (1,260); Winston–Salem, NC
January 16, 2022; 1:00 p.m., ACCRSN	No. 20	No. 21 North Carolina	W 70–65	13–3 (4–1)	Purcell Pavilion (5,905); Notre Dame, IN
January 20, 2022; 6:00 p.m., ACCRSN	No. 19	at Boston College	L 71–73	13–4 (4–2)	Conte Forum (1,017); Chestnut Hill, MA
January 23, 2022; 2:00 p.m., ACCNX	No. 19	at Pittsburgh	W 77–63	14–4 (5–2)	Peterson Events Center (2,201); Pittsburgh, PA
January 25, 2022; 6:00 p.m., ACCNX	No. 20	at Virginia; Rescheduled from Dec 30, 2021	Postponed, UVA forfeit		John Paul Jones Arena; Charlottesville, VA
January 27, 2022; 6:00 p.m., ACCN	No. 20	Syracuse	W 83–62	15–4 (7–2)	Purcell Pavilion (4,493); Notre Dame, IN
January 30, 2022; 2:00 p.m., ACCN	No. 20	Boston College	W 74–61	16–4 (8–2)	Purcell Pavilion (5,584); Notre Dame, IN
February 1, 2022; 7:00 p.m., ACCNX	No. 20	No. 3 NC State; Rescheduled from Jan. 9	W 69–66	17–4 (9–2)	Purcell Pavilion (5,566); Notre Dame, IN
February 3, 2022; 8:00 p.m., ACCN	No. 20	Virginia Tech	W 68–55	18–4 (10–2)	Purcell Pavilion (4,230); Notre Dame, IN
February 6, 2022; 2:00 p.m., ACCN	No. 20	at Florida State	L 65–70	18–5 (10–3)	Donald L. Tucker Center (2,678); Tallahassee, FL
February 10, 2022; 6:00 p.m., ACCRSN	No. 18	Miami (FL)	W 69–53	19–5 (11–3)	Purcell Pavilion (4,906); Notre Dame, IN
February 13, 2022; 2:00 p.m., ESPN	No. 18	at No. 3 Louisville	L 47–73	19–6 (11–4)	KFC Yum! Center (10,056); Louisville, KY
February 17, 2022; 8:00 p.m., ACCN	No. 19	at No. 16 Georgia Tech	W 72–66 ^{OT}	20–6 (12–4)	McCamish Pavilion (3,099); Atlanta, GA
February 24, 2022; 8:00 p.m., ACCN	No. 14	Clemson	W 77–56	21–6 (13–4)	Purcell Pavilion (3,641); Notre Dame, IN
February 27, 2022; Noon, ESPN2	No. 14	No. 4 Louisville	L 64–86	21–7 (13–5)	Purcell Pavilion (7,531); Notre Dame, IN
ACC Women's Tournament
March 4, 2022; 8:00 p.m., ACCRSN	(3) No. 20	vs. (6) No. 25 Georgia Tech; Quarterfinals	W 71–53	22–7	Greensboro, NC (5,682); Greensboro Coliseum
March 5, 2022; 2:30 p.m., ACCN	(3) No. 20	vs. (7) Miami (FL); Semifinals	L 54–57	22–8	Greensboro, NC (7,923); Greensboro Coliseum
NCAA tournament
March 19, 2022*; 7:30 p.m., ESPN2	(5 B) No. 21	vs. (12 B) UMass; First Round	W 89–78	23–8	Lloyd Noble Center; Norman, OK
March 21, 2022*; 5:00 p.m., ESPN2	(5 B) No. 21	at (4 B) No. 22 Oklahoma; Second Round	W 108–64	24–8	Lloyd Noble Center (3,258); Norman, OK
March 26, 2022*; 11:30 a.m., ESPN	(5 B) No. 21	vs. (1 B) No. 3 NC State; Sweet Sixteen	L 63–66	24–9	Total Mortgage Arena; Bridgeport, CT
*Non-conference game. ^{#}Rankings from AP Poll. (#) Tournament seedings in parentheses. B=Bridgeport. All times are in Eastern.

== Rankings ==
Regular season polls
Poll	Pre- season	Week 2	Week 3	Week 4	Week 5	Week 6	Week 7	Week 8	Week 9	Week 10	Week 11	Week 12	Week 13	Week 14	Week 15	Week 16	Week 17	Week 18	Final
AP	RV	RV	RV	24	22	21	20	17	20	20	19	20	20	18	19	14	20	22	21
Coaches	RV	RV	25	23	18	17	15	19	19	17	18	19	19	20	16	20	21	21	17

Legend
	Increase in ranking
	Decrease in ranking
	Not ranked in previous week
(RV)	Received votes
(NR)	Not ranked
