= 2021–22 Pittsburgh Panthers women's basketball team =

Intercollegiate basketball season

2021–22 Pittsburgh Panthers women's basketball
- Conference: Atlantic Coast Conference
- Record: 11–19 (2–16 ACC)
- Head coach: Lance White (4th season)
- Assistant coaches: Terri Mitchell; Josh Petersen; Bridgette Mitchell
- Home arena: Petersen Events Center

2021–22 ACC women's basketball standings
| | Conf. | | | | Overall |
| Team | W | | L | PCT | W | | L | PCT |
|---|---|---|---|---|---|---|---|---|
| No. 3 NC State † | 17 | – | 1 | .944 | 32 | – | 4 | .889 |
| No. 4 Louisville | 16 | – | 2 | .889 | 29 | – | 5 | .853 |
| No. 17 North Carolina | 13 | – | 5 | .722 | 25 | – | 7 | .781 |
| No. 21 Notre Dame | 13 | – | 5 | .722 | 24 | – | 9 | .727 |
| No. 16 Virginia Tech | 13 | – | 5 | .722 | 23 | – | 10 | .697 |
| Georgia Tech | 11 | – | 7 | .611 | 21 | – | 11 | .656 |
| Boston College | 10 | – | 8 | .556 | 21 | – | 12 | .636 |
| Miami (FL) | 10 | – | 8 | .556 | 21 | – | 13 | .618 |
| Florida State | 10 | – | 8 | .556 | 17 | – | 14 | .548 |
| Duke | 7 | – | 11 | .389 | 17 | – | 13 | .567 |
| Wake Forest | 4 | – | 14 | .222 | 16 | – | 17 | .485 |
| Syracuse | 4 | – | 14 | .222 | 11 | – | 18 | .379 |
| Clemson | 3 | – | 15 | .167 | 10 | – | 21 | .323 |
| Pittsburgh | 2 | – | 16 | .111 | 11 | – | 19 | .367 |
| Virginia | 2 | – | 16 | .111 | 5 | – | 22 | .185 |
† 2022 ACC tournament winner Rankings from AP poll

The 2021–22 Pittsburgh Panthers women's basketball team represented the University of Pittsburgh during the 2021–22 NCAA Division I women's basketball season. The Panthers, led by fourth-year head coach Lance White, played their home games at the Petersen Events Center as members of the Atlantic Coast Conference.

The Panthers finished the season 11–19 overall, and 2–16 in ACC play, to finish in a tie for fourteenth place. As the fifteenth seed in the ACC tournament, they lost their First Round matchup with Duke. They were not invited to the NCAA tournament or the WNIT.

== Previous season ==
The Panthers finished the season 5–14 and 3–12 in ACC play to finish in twelfth place. In the ACC tournament, they lost to Boston College in the first round. They were not invited to the NCAA tournament or the WNIT.

== Off-season ==
=== Departures ===
Departures
| Name | Number | Pos. | Height | Year | Hometown | Reason for departure |
|---|---|---|---|---|---|---|
| Cara Judkins | 11 | C | 6'2" | Senior | Bethesda, MD | Graduated |
| Gabbie Green | 12 | G | 5'7" | Senior | Bellville, TX | Transferred to Louisiana Tech |
| Marcella LaMark | 21 | C | 6'4" | Senior | São Paulo, Brazil | Graduated |

=== Incoming transfers ===
Incoming transfers
| Name | Number | Pos. | Height | Year | Hometown | Previous school |
|---|---|---|---|---|---|---|
| Mary Dunn | 15 | F | 6'3" | Graduate student | Washington, PA | Youngstown State |

=== Recruiting class ===
College recruiting
| Name | Hometown | School | Height | Weight | Commit date |
|---|---|---|---|---|---|
| Maliyah Johnson; F | Columbus, OH | Africentric Early College | 6 ft 0 in (1.83 m) | N/A | Nov 19, 2020 |
| Maliyah Johnson; F | Recruit ratings: No ratings found | | | | |
Overall recruit ranking:
Note: In many cases, Scout, Rivals, 247Sports, On3, and ESPN may conflict in their listings of height and weight.; In these cases, the average was taken. ESPN grades are on a 100-point scale.; Sources:

== Roster ==
2021–22 Pittsburgh Panthers women's basketball team
Players
Coaches

| Pos. | # | Name | Height | Year | Previous school | Hometown |
|---|---|---|---|---|---|---|
| G | 0 | Sandrine Clesca | 5 ft 9 in (1.75 m) | So | Winston-Salem Christian School | Laval, QC |
| G | 1 | Dayshanette Harris | 5 ft 7 in (1.7 m) | Jr | Ursuline | Youngstown, OH |
| G | 2 | Liatu King | 6 ft 0 in (1.83 m) | So | Bishop McNamara | Washington, D.C. |
| G | 3 | Taisha Exanor | 6 ft 0 in (1.83 m) | So | Dawson College | Châteauguay, QC |
| G | 4 | Emy Hayford | 5 ft 8 in (1.73 m) | Jr | Caland Lyceum | Maastricht, Netherlands |
| G | 5 | Amber Brown | 6 ft 0 in (1.83 m) | Jr | Little Rock Christian Academy | Monroe, LA |
| G | 10 | Ismini Prapa | 5 ft 7 in (1.7 m) | Sr | American Community School of Athens | Athens, Greece |
| F | 13 | Tracey Hueston | 6 ft 2 in (1.88 m) | So | Northside | Roanoke, VA |
| F | 14 | Cynthia Ezeja | 6 ft 3 in (1.91 m) | RS So | 20th High School of Athens | Athens, Greece |
| F | 15 | Mary Dunn | 6 ft 3 in (1.91 m) | GS | Trinity; Youngstown State | Washington, PA |
| G | 20 | Jayla Everett | 5 ft 10 in (1.78 m) | Sr | Kirkwood HS; New Mexico | St. Louis, MO |
| G/F | 21 | Maliyah Johnson | 6 ft 0 in (1.83 m) | Fr | Africentric Early College | Columbus, OH |
| F | 23 | Rita Igbokwe | 6 ft 4 in (1.93 m) | Jr | Mundy's Mill | Jonesboro, GA |
| G | 31 | Destiny Strother | 5 ft 9 in (1.75 m) | Jr | Carman-Ainsworth; Marquette | Flint, MI |

Head coach

- Lance White (Texas Tech)

Assistant coach(es)

- Terri Mitchell (Duquesne)
- Josh Petersen (Florida State)
- Bridgette Mitchell (Duke)

Legend

- (C) Team captain
- (S) Suspended
- (I) Ineligible
- (W) Walk-on
- Injured
- Current redshirt

Roster
Last update: November 5, 2021}

== Schedule ==
| Date time, TV | Rank^{#} | Opponent^{#} | Result | Record | Site (attendance) city, state |
Regular season
| November 10, 2021*; 6:00 p.m., ACCNX | | Radford | W 82–63 | 1–0 | Peterson Events Center (1,237); Pittsburgh, PA |
| November 12, 2021*; 6:00 p.m., ACCNX | | Lafayette | W 72–63 | 2–0 | Peterson Events Center (1,272); Pittsburgh, PA |
| November 17, 2021*; 6:00 p.m., ACCNX | | LIU | W 92–41 | 3–0 | Peterson Events Center (1,213); Pittsburgh, PA |
| November 20, 2021*; 8:00 p.m. | | at Duquesne; City Game | W 69–64 | 4–0 | UPMC Cooper Fieldhouse (1,507); Pittsburgh, PA |
| November 25, 2021*; 8:00 p.m., ESPN+ | | vs. No. 23 Texas A&M; Paradise Jam tournament | L 46–57 | 4–1 | Sports and Fitness Center (621); Saint Thomas, USVI |
| November 26, 2021*; 5:45 p.m., ESPN+ | | vs. Northwestern; Paradise Jam Tournament | W 72–60 | 5–1 | Sports and Fitness Center (0); Saint Thomas, USVI |
| November 27, 2021*; 5:45 p.m., ESPN+ | | vs. South Dakota; Paradise Jam Tournament | L 61–72 ^{OT} | 5–2 | Sports and Fitness Center (0); Saint Thomas, USVI |
| December 1, 2021*; 6:00 p.m., ACCN | | Rutgers; ACC–Big Ten Women's Challenge | W 58–50 | 6–2 | Peterson Events Center (1,390); Pittsburgh, PA |
| December 4, 2021*; 1:00 p.m. | | at Ball State | W 64–54 | 7–2 | Worthen Arena (0); Muncie, IN |
| December 7, 2021*; 6:00 p.m., ACCNX | | Coppin State | W 67–51 | 8–2 | Peterson Events Center (1,146); Pittsburgh, PA |
| December 10, 2021; 6:00 p.m., ACCN | | No. 2 NC State | L 54–89 | 8–3 (0–1) | Peterson Events Center (1,357); Pittsburgh, PA |
| December 19, 2021; 2:00 p.m., ACCNX | | at No. 21 Notre Dame | L 59–85 | 8–4 (0–2) | Purcell Pavilion (4,983); Notre Dame, IN |
| December 22, 2021*; Noon, ACCNX | | Holy Cross | W 67–56 | 9–4 | Peterson Events Center (1,443); Pittsburgh, PA |
| December 30, 2021; 6:00 p.m., ACCNX | | No. 16 Georgia Tech | Postponed | | Peterson Events Center; Pittsburgh, PA |
| January 2, 2022; 2:00 p.m., ACCNX | | at Boston College | Postponed | | Conte Forum; Chestnut Hill, MA |
| January 6, 2022; 6:00 p.m., ACCN | | at No. 3 Louisville | L 39–81 | 9–5 (0–3) | KFC Yum! Center (6,703); Louisville, KY |
| January 11, 2022; 6:00 p.m., ACCNX | | No. 15 Georgia Tech | L 52–63 | 9–6 (0–4) | Peterson Events Center (1,286); Pittsburgh, PA |
| January 13, 2022; 6:00 p.m., ACCNX | | Boston College | L 64–75 | 9–7 (0–5) | Peterson Events Center (1,131); Pittsburgh, PA |
| January 16, 2022; 2:00 p.m., ACCNX | | Wake Forest | W 65–57 | 10–7 (1–5) | Peterson Events Center (1,164); Pittsburgh, PA |
| January 20, 2022; 6:00 p.m., ACCN | | at Virginia Tech | L 65–75 | 10–8 (1–6) | Cassell Coliseum (1,472); Blacksburg, VA |
| January 23, 2022; 2:00 p.m., ACCNX | | No. 19 Notre Dame | L 63–77 | 10–9 (1–7) | Peterson Events Center (2,201); Pittsburgh, PA |
| January 27, 2022; 7:00 p.m., ACCNX | | at Clemson | W 78–73 ^{OT} | 11–9 (2–7) | Littlejohn Coliseum (373); Clemson, SC |
| January 30, 2022; Noon, ACCN | | at Syracuse | L 72–80 | 11–10 (2–8) | Carrier Dome (1,056); Syracuse, NY |
| February 3, 2022; 6:00 p.m., ACCNX | | Duke | L 39–54 | 11–11 (2–9) | Peterson Events Center (1,031); Pittsburgh, PA |
| February 10, 2022; 6:00 p.m., ACCNX | | at No. 23 North Carolina | L 54–64 | 11–12 (2–10) | Carmichael Arena (1,479); Chapel Hill, NC |
| February 13, 2022; 2:00 p.m., ACCN | | Syracuse | L 65–67 | 11–13 (2–11) | Peterson Events Center (2,073); Pittsburgh, PA |
| February 15, 2022; 7:00 p.m., ACCNX | | at Boston College | L 57–69 | 11–14 (2–12) | Conte Forum (621); Chestnut Hill, MA |
| February 17, 2022; 6:00 p.m., ACCN | | at Miami (FL) | L 50–60 | 11–15 (2–13) | Watsco Center (1,298); Coral Gables, FL |
| February 20, 2022; 4:00 p.m., ACCN | | at Virginia | L 65–74 | 11–16 (2–14) | John Paul Jones Arena (1,872); Charlottesville, VA |
| February 24, 2022; 6:00 p.m., ACCNX | | No. 4 Louisville | L 55–66 | 11–17 (2–15) | Peterson Events Center (1,344); Pittsburgh, PA |
| February 27, 2022; 2:00 p.m., ACCN | | Florida State | L 52–57 | 11–18 (2–16) | Peterson Events Center; Pittsburgh, PA |
ACC Women's tournament
| March 2, 2022; 3:30 p.m., ACCRSN | (15) | vs. (10) Duke; First round | L 52–55 | 11–19 | Greensboro Coliseum (3,619); Greensboro, NC |
*Non-conference game. ^{#}Rankings from AP poll. (#) Tournament seedings in parentheses. All times are in Eastern.

== Rankings ==
Regular season polls
| Poll | Pre- season | Week 2 | Week 3 | Week 4 | Week 5 | Week 6 | Week 7 | Week 8 | Week 9 | Week 10 | Week 11 | Week 12 | Week 13 | Week 14 | Week 15 | Week 16 | Week 17 | Week 18 | Final |
|---|---|---|---|---|---|---|---|---|---|---|---|---|---|---|---|---|---|---|---|
| AP | | | | | | | | | | | | | | | | | | | |
| Coaches | | | | | | | | | | | | | | | | | | | |

Legend
| | Increase in ranking |
| | Decrease in ranking |
| | Not ranked in previous week |
| (RV) | Received votes |
| (NR) | Not ranked |

Coaches did not release a Week 2 poll, and AP does not release a poll after the NCAA tournament.
