= 2021–22 Wake Forest Demon Deacons women's basketball team =

Intercollegiate basketball season

2021–22 Wake Forest Demon Deacons women's basketball

WNIT, second round
- Conference: Atlantic Coast Conference
- Record: 16–17 (4–14 ACC)
- Head coach: Jen Hoover (10th season)
- Associate head coach: Erin Dickerson Davis
- Assistant coaches: Dane Sparrow; Cherie Cordoba
- Home arena: LJVM Coliseum

2021–22 ACC women's basketball standings
	Conf.				Overall
Team	W		L	PCT	W		L	PCT
No. 3 NC State †	17	–	1	.944	32	–	4	.889
No. 4 Louisville	16	–	2	.889	29	–	5	.853
No. 17 North Carolina	13	–	5	.722	25	–	7	.781
No. 21 Notre Dame	13	–	5	.722	24	–	9	.727
No. 16 Virginia Tech	13	–	5	.722	23	–	10	.697
Georgia Tech	11	–	7	.611	21	–	11	.656
Boston College	10	–	8	.556	21	–	12	.636
Miami (FL)	10	–	8	.556	21	–	13	.618
Florida State	10	–	8	.556	17	–	14	.548
Duke	7	–	11	.389	17	–	13	.567
Wake Forest	4	–	14	.222	16	–	17	.485
Syracuse	4	–	14	.222	11	–	18	.379
Clemson	3	–	15	.167	10	–	21	.323
Pittsburgh	2	–	16	.111	11	–	19	.367
Virginia	2	–	16	.111	5	–	22	.185
† 2022 ACC tournament winner Rankings from AP poll

The 2021–22 Wake Forest Demon Deacons women's basketball team represented Wake Forest University during the 2021–22 NCAA Division I women's basketball season. The Demon Deacons, led by tenth-year head coach Jen Hoover, competed as members of the Atlantic Coast Conference and played their home games at the Lawrence Joel Veterans Memorial Coliseum.

The Demon Deacons finished the season 16–17 overall and 4–14 in ACC play to finish in a tie for eleventh place. As the eleventh seed in the ACC tournament, they defeated fourteenth seed Virginia in the first round before losing to sixth seed Georgia Tech in the second round. They received an at-large bid to the WNIT. They defeated Akron in the first round before losing to Middle Tennessee in the second round to end their season.

== Previous season ==
The Demon Deacons finished the season 12–13 and 8–10 in ACC play to finish in a tie for ninth place. As the ninth seed in the ACC tournament, they defeated North Carolina in the second round before losing to Louisville in the quarterfinals. They received an at-large bid to the NCAA tournament as the nine seed in the Alamo Region. In the tournament, they lost in the first round to eight seed Oklahoma State.

== Off-season ==
=== Departures ===
Departures
Name	Number	Pos.	Height	Year	Hometown	Reason for departure
Maya Banks	0	F	6'4"	Senior	Chandler, Arizona	Transferred to Georgia Southern
Anaia Hoard	1	G	5'10"	Sophomore	Carnon, France	–
Gina Conti	5	G	5'10"	Senior	Grove City, Ohio	Transferred to UCLA
Ivana Raca	11	F	6'2"	Senior	Belgrade, Serbia	Graduated; declared for 2021 WNBA draft
Nevaeah Brown	15	G	5'8"	Freshman	Charlotte, North Carolina	Transferred to Appalachian State

=== Incoming transfers ===
Incoming transfers
Name	Number	Pos.	Height	Year	Hometown	Previous school
Niyah Becker	14	G	6'2"	Junior	Winnipeg, Canada	Utah

=== Recruiting class ===
College recruiting
Name	Hometown	School	Height	Weight	Commit date
Raegyn Conley; G	Chattanooga, Tennessee	Baylor School	6 ft 0 in (1.83 m)	N/A	
Raegyn Conley; G	Recruit ratings: ESPN: (91)				
Elise Williams; G	Raleigh, North Carolina	Wakefield	5 ft 9 in (1.75 m)	N/A	
Elise Williams; G	Recruit ratings: ESPN: (90)				
Overall recruit ranking:
Note: In many cases, Scout, Rivals, 247Sports, On3, and ESPN may conflict in their listings of height and weight.; In these cases, the average was taken. ESPN grades are on a 100-point scale.; Sources:

== Roster ==
2021–22 Wake Forest Demon Deacons women's basketball team
Players
Coaches

Pos.	#	Name	Height	Year	Previous school	Hometown
G	0	Alyssa Andrews	6 ft 0 in (1.83 m)	Fr	Colgan	Woodbridge, VA
G	2	Kaia Harrison	5 ft 7 in (1.7 m)	Jr	Baldwin	Baldwin, NY
G	3	Mack Maier	5 ft 10 in (1.78 m)	Jr	Chaparral	Parker, CO
G	4	Aliah McWhorter	6 ft 1 in (1.85 m)	So	Sycamore	Cincinnati, OH
G	5	Malaya Cowles	6 ft 3 in (1.91 m)	Fr	Winston-Salem Christian	Wilkesboro, NC
G	11	Raegyn Conley	6 ft 0 in (1.83 m)	Fr	Baylor School	Chattanooga, TN
G	12	Kaylen Dickson	5 ft 11 in (1.8 m)	Sr	Warren Township	Gurnee, IL
G	14	Niyah Becker	6 ft 2 in (1.88 m)	Jr	Lincoln Prep; Utah	Winnipeg, Canada
F	20	Olivia Summiel	6 ft 2 in (1.88 m)	Jr	Marianapolis Prep	Dayville, CT
F	23	Christina Morra	6 ft 2 in (1.88 m)	Sr	King's Christian Collegiate	Toronto, Canada
G	24	Jewel Spear	5 ft 10 in (1.78 m)	So	The Colony	The Colony, TX
F	25	DeMeara Hinds	6 ft 2 in (1.88 m)	So	Lithia Springs	Douglasville, GA
G	32	Alexandria Scruggs	5 ft 10 in (1.78 m)	Jr	E. E. Smith	Fayetteville, NC

Head coach

- Jen Hoover (Wake Forest)

Assistant coach(es)

- Erin Dickerson Davis (Northwestern)
- Cherie Cordoba (UNLV)
- Dane Sparrow (UNC Greensboro)

Legend

- (C) Team captain
- (S) Suspended
- (I) Ineligible
- (W) Walk-on
- Injured
- Current redshirt

Roster
Last update: November 10, 2021

== Schedule ==
Date time, TV	Rank^{#}	Opponent^{#}	Result	Record	Site (attendance) city, state
Non-conference regular season
November 9, 2021*; 7:00 p.m., ESPN+		at Mercer	W 68–55	1–0	Hawkins Arena (1,263); Macon, GA
November 12, 2021*; 4:00 p.m., ACCNX		Cornell	W 64–42	2–0	LJVM Coliseum (312); Winston-Salem, NC
November 14, 2021*; 1:00 p.m., ACCNX		UNC Greensboro	W 56–45	3–0	LJVM Coliseum (387); Winston-Salem, NC
November 18, 2021*; 7:00 p.m., ACCNX		Charlotte	W 55–49	4–0	LJVM Coliseum (207); Winston-Salem, NC
November 21, 2021*; 6:00 p.m., ACCN		East Carolina	W 73–52	5–0	LJVM Coliseum (384); Winston-Salem, NC
November 24, 2021*; 4:00 p.m., ESPN+		at High Point	W 79–50	6–0	Qubein Center (834); High Point, NC
November 27, 2021*; 1:00 p.m., ACCNX		UMBC	W 98–48	7–0	LJVM Coliseum (462); Winston-Salem, NC
December 1, 2021*; 7:00 p.m., ACCRSN		Nebraska; ACC–Big Ten Women's Challenge	L 60–86	7–1	LJVM Coliseum (501); Winston-Salem, NC
December 4, 2021*; 3:00 p.m., ACCNX		Troy	W 90–61	8–1	LJVM Coliseum (524); Winston-Salem, NC
December 13, 2021*; 11:00 a.m., ACCNX		ETSU	W 90–58	9–1	LJVM Coliseum (1,245); Winston-Salem, NC
December 15, 2021*; 7:00 p.m., ACCNX		South Carolina State	W 94–40	10–1	LJVM Coliseum (529); Winston-Salem, NC
ACC regular season
December 19, 2021; 6:00 p.m., ACCN		at No. 18 Georgia Tech	L 45–62	10–2 (0–1)	McCamish Pavilion (1,667); Atlanta, GA
December 30, 2021; 7:00 p.m., ACCNX		Florida State	W 75–69 ^{OT}	11–2 (1–1)	LJVM Coliseum (703); Winston-Salem, NC
January 2, 2022; 4:00 p.m., ACCN		Virginia Tech	L 53–66	11–3 (1–2)	LJVM Coliseum (776); Winston-Salem, NC
January 6, 2022; 7:00 p.m., ACCNX		at Miami (FL)	W 47–46	12–3 (2–2)	Watsco Center (1,135); Coral Gables, FL
January 9, 2022; Noon, ACCN		at Florida State	L 46–87	12–4 (2–3)	Donald L. Tucker Center (2,068); Tallahassee, FL
January 13, 2022; 7:00 p.m., ACCNX		No. 20 Notre Dame	L 64–74	12—5 (2–4)	LJVM Coliseum (1,260); Winston-Salem, NC
January 16, 2022; 2:00 p.m., ACCNX		at Pittsburgh	L 57–65	12—6 (2–5)	Peterson Events Center (1,164); Pittsburgh, PA
January 20, 2022; 7:00 p.m., ACCNX		Clemson	L 44–66	12—7 (2–6)	LJVM Coliseum (1,547); Winston-Salem, NC
January 23, 2022; 2:00 p.m., ACCN		at No. 3 Louisville	L 60–72	12–8 (2–7)	KFC Yum! Center (8,802); Louisville, KY
January 27, 2022; 7:00 p.m., ACCRSN		Miami (FL)	L 59–66	12–9 (2–8)	LJVM Coliseum (1,690); Winston-Salem, NC
February 3, 2022; 8:00 p.m., ACCRSN		No. 24 North Carolina	L 59–78	12–10 (2–9)	LJVM Coliseum (1,916); Winston-Salem, NC
February 6, 2022; 6:00 p.m., ACCN		at Duke	L 76–81	12–11 (2–10)	Cameron Indoor Stadium (2,487); Durham, NC
February 10, 2022; 2:00 p.m., ACCN		at Clemson	L 78–87	12–12 (2–11)	Littlejohn Coliseum (580); Clemson, SC
February 13, 2022; 4:00 p.m., ACCN		Virginia	W 68–53	13–12 (3–11)	LJVM Coliseum (1,994); Winston-Salem, NC
February 17, 2022; 8:00 p.m., ACCRSN		at No. 4 NC State	L 61–92	13–13 (3–12)	Reynolds Coliseum (5,500); Raleigh, NC
February 20, 2022; Noon, ACCN		at Boston College	L 70–82	13–14 (3–13)	Conte Forum; Chestnut Hill, MA
February 24, 2022; 7:00 p.m., ACCNX		Syracuse	W 76–60	14–14 (4–13)	LJVM Coliseum (1,997); Winston-Salem, NC
February 27, 2022; 1:00 p.m., ACCNX		No. 22 Georgia Tech	L 56–64	14–15 (4–14)	LJVM Coliseum; Winston-Salem, NC
ACC Women's Tournament
March 2, 2022; 6:30 p.m., ACCRSN	(11)	vs. (14) Virginia; First round	W 61–53	15–15	Greensboro Coliseum (3,619); Greensboro, NC
March 3, 2022; 8:00 p.m., ACCRSN	(11)	vs. (6) No. 25 Georgia Tech; Second round	L 40–45	15–16	Greensboro Coliseum (5,648); Greensboro, NC
WNIT
March 17, 2022; 7:00 p.m., ACCNX		Akron; First Round	W 71–59	16–16	LJVM Coliseum (282); Winston-Salem, NC
March 21, 2022; 7:30 p.m.		at Middle Tennessee; Second Round	L 55–67	16–17	Murphy Center (2,050); Murfreesboro, TN
*Non-conference game. ^{#}Rankings from AP Poll. (#) Tournament seedings in parentheses. All times are in Eastern.

== Rankings ==
Regular season polls
Poll	Pre- season	Week 2	Week 3	Week 4	Week 5	Week 6	Week 7	Week 8	Week 9	Week 10	Week 11	Week 12	Week 13	Week 14	Week 15	Week 16	Week 17	Week 18	Week 19	Final
AP																				N/A
Coaches		RV	RV		RV															

Legend
	Increase in ranking
	Decrease in ranking
	Not ranked in previous week
(RV)	Received votes
(NR)	Not ranked

Coaches did not release a Week 2 poll, and AP does not release a final poll.

== See also ==
- 2021–22 Wake Forest Demon Deacons men's basketball team
