= 2021–22 Florida State Seminoles women's basketball team =

Intercollegiate basketball season

2021–22 Florida State Seminoles women's basketball

NCAA tournament, First Four
- Conference: Atlantic Coast Conference
- Record: 17–14 (10–8 ACC)
- Head coach: Sue Semrau (24th season)
- Assistant coaches: Brooke Wyckoff; Joy McCorvey; Morgan Toles
- Home arena: Donald L. Tucker Center (Capacity: 12,100)

2021–22 ACC women's basketball standings
	Conf.				Overall
Team	W		L	PCT	W		L	PCT
No. 3 NC State †	17	–	1	.944	32	–	4	.889
No. 4 Louisville	16	–	2	.889	29	–	5	.853
No. 17 North Carolina	13	–	5	.722	25	–	7	.781
No. 21 Notre Dame	13	–	5	.722	24	–	9	.727
No. 16 Virginia Tech	13	–	5	.722	23	–	10	.697
Georgia Tech	11	–	7	.611	21	–	11	.656
Boston College	10	–	8	.556	21	–	12	.636
Miami (FL)	10	–	8	.556	21	–	13	.618
Florida State	10	–	8	.556	17	–	14	.548
Duke	7	–	11	.389	17	–	13	.567
Wake Forest	4	–	14	.222	16	–	17	.485
Syracuse	4	–	14	.222	11	–	18	.379
Clemson	3	–	15	.167	10	–	21	.323
Pittsburgh	2	–	16	.111	11	–	19	.367
Virginia	2	–	16	.111	5	–	22	.185
† 2022 ACC tournament winner Rankings from AP poll

The 2021–22 Florida State Seminoles women's basketball team, variously Florida State or FSU, represented Florida State University during the 2021–22 NCAA Division I women's basketball season. They were led by twenty-fourth-year head coach Sue Semrau, who returned after taking a season-long break and retired following the season. The Seminoles played their home games at the Donald L. Tucker Center on the university's Tallahassee, Florida campus. They competed as members of the Atlantic Coast Conference.

The Seminoles finished the season 17–14 overall and 10–8 in ACC play to finish in a three-way tie for seventh place. As the ninth seed in the ACC tournament, they defeated eighth seed Boston College in the Second Round before losing to eventual champions, and first seed NC State in the Quarterfinals. They received an at-large bid to the NCAA tournament, marking the ninth consecutive year the team has qualified for the tournament. As an eleven seed, the team played a First Four match against Missouri State, which they lost, 60–51, to end their season.

On March 21, 2022, Semrau announced her retirement after 24 seasons as FSU. She was succeeded by Seminoles associate head coach Brooke Wyckoff, who served as the interim head coach for the team during the 2020–21 season during Semrau's leave of absence.

== Previous season ==
Brooke Wyckoff served as the interim head coach for the season as Sue Semrau took the season off to care for her mother.

The Seminoles finished the season 10–9 and 9–7 in ACC play to finish in a tie for fourth place. As the fourth seed in the ACC tournament, they lost to Syracuse in the Quarterfinals. The Seminoles went on to make the NCAA tournament for the eighth consecutive season. As the nine seed in the HemisFair Regional, the Seminoles lost to Oregon State in the First Round.

== Off-season ==
=== Departures ===
Departures
Name	Number	Pos.	Height	Year	Hometown	Reason for departure
Sayawni Lassiter	3	G	5'10"	(redshirt) Junior	Dorchester, Massachusetts	Transferred to Rutgers
Savannah Wilkinson	12	F	6'0"	(redshirt) Junior	London, England	Transferred to SMU

=== 2021 recruiting class ===
College recruiting information
Name	Hometown	School	Height	Weight	Commit date
O'Mariah Gordon; PG	Bradenton, Florida	Braden River	5 ft 4 in (1.63 m)	N/A	
O'Mariah Gordon; PG	Recruit ratings: ESPN: (94)				
Makayla Timpson; F	Edison, Georgia	Early County	6 ft 2 in (1.88 m)	N/A	
Makayla Timpson; F	Recruit ratings: ESPN: (93)				
Mariana Valenzuela; F	Mazatlán, Mexico	Montverde Academy	6 ft 2 in (1.88 m)	N/A	
Mariana Valenzuela; F	Recruit ratings: ESPN: (90)				
Overall recruit ranking:
Note: In many cases, Scout, Rivals, 247Sports, On3, and ESPN may conflict in their listings of height and weight.; In these cases, the average was taken. ESPN grades are on a 100-point scale.; Sources:

== Roster ==
2021–22 Florida State Seminoles women's basketball team
Players
Coaches

Pos.	#	Name	Height	Year	Hometown
G	0	Bianca Jackson	5 ft 11 in (1.8 m)	RS Sr	Montgomery, AL
C	1	River Baldwin	6 ft 5 in (1.96 m)	Jr	Andalusia, AL
G	2	Sammie Puisis	6 ft 1 in (1.85 m)	Jr	Mason, OH
G	3	Amaya Brown	5 ft 11 in (1.8 m)	RS Jr	Albuquerque, NM
G	4	Sara Bejedi	5 ft 7 in (1.7 m)	Jr	Helsinki, Finland
F	5	Mariana Valenzuela	6 ft 2 in (1.88 m)	Fr	Mazatlán, Mexico
G	10	Kourtney Webber	5 ft 10 in (1.78 m)	Sr	New Orleans, LA
G	11	O'Mariah Gordon	5 ft 4 in (1.63 m)	Fr	Bradenton, FL
F	14	Erin Howard	6 ft 1 in (1.85 m)	RS Jr	Madison, WI
F	21	Makayla Timpson	6 ft 2 in (1.88 m)	Fr	Edison, GA
G	23	Tiana England	5 ft 7 in (1.7 m)	RS Sr	Stamford, CT
G	24	Morgan Jones	6 ft 2 in (1.88 m)	Sr	Jonesboro, GA
F	32	Valencia Myers	6 ft 3 in (1.91 m)	Sr	Solon, OH
G	33	Izabella Nicoletti	5 ft 10 in (1.78 m)	RS Jr	São Paulo, Brazil

Head coach

- Sue Semrau (UC San Diego)

Assistant coach(es)

- Brooke Wyckoff (Florida State)
- Joy McCorvey (St. John's)
- Morgan Toles (Florida State)

Legend

- (C) Team captain
- (S) Suspended
- (I) Ineligible
- (W) Walk-on
- Injured
- Current redshirt

Roster
Last update: October 25, 2021

== Schedule and results ==
Date time, TV	Rank^{#}	Opponent^{#}	Result	Record	Site (attendance) city, state
Exhibition
November 3, 2021*; 7:00 p.m.	No. 16	West Florida	W 91–47	–	Donald L. Tucker Center; Tallahassee, FL
Regular season
November 9, 2021*; 7:00 p.m., ACCNX	No. 16	North Florida	W 78–50	1–0	Donald L. Tucker Center (1,819); Tallahassee, FL
November 14, 2021*; 2:00 p.m., ACCNX	No. 16	Milwaukee	W 79–42	2–0	Donald L. Tucker Center (2,307); Tallahassee, FL
November 18, 2021*; 7:00 p.m., ACCNX	No. 17	Jacksonville	W 64–39	3–0	Donald L. Tucker Center (1,881); Tallahassee, FL
November 21, 2021*; 2:00 p.m., ACCNX	No. 17	Grambling State	W 76–53	4–0	Donald L. Tucker Center (2,010); Tallahassee, FL
November 25, 2021*; 7:00 p.m., FloSports	No. 17	vs. BYU; St. Pete Showcase	L 54–61	4–1	McArthur Center (340); St. Petersburg, FL
November 27, 2021*; 11:00 a.m., FloSports	No. 17	vs. Purdue; St. Pete Showcase	L 61–66	4–2	McArthur Center (250); St. Petersburg, FL
December 2, 2021*; 8:00 p.m., BTN+	No. 25	at Illinois; ACC–Big Ten Women's Challenge	W 67–58	5–2	State Farm Center (1,027); Champaign, IL
December 5, 2021*; 1:00 p.m., ACCNX	No. 25	Charleston Southern	W 83–32	6–2	Donald L. Tucker Center (2,094); Tallahassee, FL
December 12, 2021*; 1:00 p.m., SECN		at Florida; Rivalry	L 55–69	6–3	O'Connell Center (1,609); Gainesville, FL
December 16, 2021*; 7:00 p.m., ACCNX		Houston	L 68–78	6–4	Donald L. Tucker Center (1,916); Tallahassee, FL
December 19, 2021; 2:00 p.m., ACCN		Virginia Tech	L 75–92	6–5 (0–1)	Donald L. Tucker Center (2,155); Tallahassee, FL
December 21, 2021*; 4:00 p.m.		at Kent State	Canceled due to COVID-19 issues		MAC Center; Kent, OH
December 30, 2021; 7:00 p.m., ACCNX		at Wake Forest	L 69–75 ^{OT}	6–6 (0–2)	LJVM Coliseum (703); Winston–Salem, NC
January 2, 2022; 2:00 p.m., ACCNX		at Syracuse	Postponed due to COVID-19 issues		Carrier Dome; Syracuse, NY
January 6, 2022; 6:00 p.m., ACCN		Clemson	Postponed due to COVID-19 issues		Donald L. Tucker Center; Tallahassee, FL
January 9, 2022; Noon, ACCN		Wake Forest	W 87–46	7–6 (1–2)	Donald L. Tucker Center (2,068); Tallahassee, FL
January 13, 2022; 8:00 p.m., ACCN		at No. 15 Georgia Tech	L 64–68	7–7 (1–3)	McCamish Pavilion (1,459); Atlanta, GA
January 18, 2022; 6:00 p.m., ACCNX		at Clemson	W 79–68	8–7 (2–3)	Littlejohn Coliseum (253); Clemson, SC
January 20, 2022; 8:00 p.m., ACCRSN		Miami (FL); Rivalry	L 52–59	8–8 (2–4)	Donald L. Tucker Center (2,190); Tallahassee, FL
January 23, 2022; 2:00 p.m., ACCRSN		Clemson	W 75–70	9–8 (3–4)	Donald L. Tucker Center (2,141); Tallahassee, FL
January 27, 2022; 8:00 p.m., ACCN		at No. 5 Louisville	L 62–75	9–9 (3–5)	KFC Yum! Center (7,755); Louisville, KY
January 30, 2022; Noon, ACCRSN		Virginia	W 62–37	10–9 (4–5)	Donald L. Tucker Center (2,144); Tallahassee, FL
February 3, 2022; 6:00 p.m., ACCN		at No. 3 NC State	L 48–68	10–10 (4–6)	Reynolds Coliseum (4,122); Raleigh, NC
February 6, 2022; 2:00 p.m., ACCN		No. 20 Notre Dame	W 70–65	11–10 (5–6)	Donald L. Tucker Center (2,678); Tallahassee, FL
February 10, 2022; 6:00 p.m., ACCNX		at Duke	W 59–56	12–10 (6–6)	Cameron Indoor Stadium (2,327); Durham, NC
February 13, 2022; Noon, ACCN		at Miami (FL); Rivalry	L 59–76	12–11 (6–7)	Watsco Center (2,034); Coral Gables, FL
February 15, 2022; 6:00 p.m., ACCNX		at Syracuse	W 73–67	13–11 (7–7)	Carrier Dome (881); Syracuse, NY
February 17, 2022; 7:00 p.m., ACCNX		Boston College	W 66–58	14–11 (8–7)	Donald L. Tucker Center (2,049); Tallahassee, FL
February 20, 2022; Noon, ACCRSN		No. 24 North Carolina	L 49–64	14–12 (8–8)	Donald L. Tucker Center (3,322); Tallahassee, FL
February 24, 2022; 6:00 p.m., ACCN		No. 22 Georgia Tech	W 65–63 ^{OT}	15–12 (9–8)	Donald L. Tucker Center (2,364); Tallahassee, FL
February 27, 2022; 2:00 p.m., ACCN		at Pittsburgh	W 57–52	16–12 (10–8)	Peterson Events Center (1,720); Pittsburgh, PA
ACC Women's Tournament
March 3, 2022; 2:00 p.m., ACCRSN	(9)	vs. (8) Boston College; Second round	W 63–58	17–12	Greensboro Coliseum (5,648); Greensboro, NC
March 4, 2022; 2:00 p.m., ACCRSN	(9)	vs. (1) No. 3 NC State; Quarterfinals	L 54–84	17–13	Greensboro Coliseum (5,682); Greensboro, NC
NCAA Women's Tournament
March 17, 2022*; 6:00 p.m., ESPN2	(11 S)	vs. (11 S) Missouri State; First Four	L 51–60	17–14	Pete Maravich Assembly Center (366); Baton Rouge, LA
*Non-conference game. ^{#}Rankings from AP Poll. (#) Tournament seedings in parentheses. S=Spokane. All times are in Eastern Time.

== Rankings ==
Ranking movements Legend: ██ Increase in ranking ██ Decrease in ranking — = Not ranked RV = Received votes
	Week																			
Poll	Pre	1	2	3	4	5	6	7	8	9	10	11	12	13	14	15	16	17	18	Final
AP	16	17	17	25	RV	—	—	—	—	—	—	—	—	—	—	—	—	—	—	Not released
Coaches	24	22	RV	RV	RV	RV	—	—	—	—	—	—	—	—	—	—	—	—	—	—

*Coaches did not release a Week 2 poll and AP does not release a final poll.
