= 2022 ACC women's basketball tournament =

American collegiate sports tournament

- Classification: Division I
- Season: 2021–22
- Teams: 15
- Site: Greensboro Coliseum; Greensboro, North Carolina
- Champions: NC State (7th title)
- Winning coach: Wes Moore (3rd title)
- MVP: Elissa Cunane (NC State)
- Attendance: 32,125
- Television: ESPN, ACC Network, ACCRSN

2021–22 ACC women's basketball standings
	Conf.				Overall
Team	W		L	PCT	W		L	PCT
No. 3 NC State †	17	–	1	.944	32	–	4	.889
No. 4 Louisville	16	–	2	.889	29	–	5	.853
No. 17 North Carolina	13	–	5	.722	25	–	7	.781
No. 21 Notre Dame	13	–	5	.722	24	–	9	.727
No. 16 Virginia Tech	13	–	5	.722	23	–	10	.697
Georgia Tech	11	–	7	.611	21	–	11	.656
Boston College	10	–	8	.556	21	–	12	.636
Miami (FL)	10	–	8	.556	21	–	13	.618
Florida State	10	–	8	.556	17	–	14	.548
Duke	7	–	11	.389	17	–	13	.567
Wake Forest	4	–	14	.222	16	–	17	.485
Syracuse	4	–	14	.222	11	–	18	.379
Clemson	3	–	15	.167	10	–	21	.323
Pittsburgh	2	–	16	.111	11	–	19	.367
Virginia	2	–	16	.111	5	–	22	.185
† 2022 ACC tournament winner Rankings from AP poll

The 2022 ACC women's basketball tournament concluded the 2021–22 season of the Atlantic Coast Conference, and was held at Greensboro Coliseum in Greensboro, North Carolina from March 2–6, 2022. This is the 22nd time in 23 years that the tournament has been held in Greensboro. The NC State Wolfpack claimed the title of ACC Champion and an automatic berth into the NCAA tournament for the third year in a row.

== Seeds ==
All 15 ACC teams are scheduled to participate in the tournament. Teams are seeded by record within the conference, with a tiebreaker system to seed teams with identical conference records. The top four seeds will receive double byes, while seeds 5 through 9 will receive single byes. NC State finished as regular season champions and received the first seed after their final day victory over Virginia Tech.

Seed	School	Conference Record	Tiebreaker
1	NC State‡†	17–1	
2	Louisville†	16–2	
3	Notre Dame†	13–5	1–0 vs. North Carolina, 1–0 vs. Virginia Tech
4	North Carolina†	13–5	0–1 vs. Notre Dame, 1–1 vs. Virginia Tech; 0–2 vs. NC State, 1–0 vs. Louisville
5	Virginia Tech#	13–5	0–1 vs. Notre Dame, 1–1 vs. North Carolina; 0–2 vs. NC State, 0–1 vs. Louisville
6	Georgia Tech#	11–7	
7	Miami#	10–8	0–1 vs. Boston College, 2–0 vs. Florida State
8	Boston College#	10–8	1–0 vs. Miami, 0–1 vs. Florida State
9	Florida State#	10–8	0–2 vs. Miami, 1–0 vs. Boston College
10	Duke	7–11	
11	Wake Forest	4–14	1–0 vs. Syracuse
12	Syracuse	4–14	0–1 vs. Wake Forest
13	Clemson	3–13	
14	Virginia	2–16	1–0 vs. Pittsburgh
15	Pittsburgh	2–16	0–1 vs. Virginia
‡ – ACC regular season champions. † – Received a double-bye in the conference tournament. # – Received a single-bye in the conference tournament.

== Schedule ==
Session	Game	Time	Matchup	Score	Television	Attendance
First round – Wednesday, March 2
Opening day	1	1:00 p.m.	No. 12 Syracuse vs No. 13 Clemson	69–88	ACCRSN	3,619
Opening day	2	3:30 p.m.	No. 10 Duke vs No. 15 Pittsburgh	55–52	ACCRSN	3,619
Opening day	3	6:30 p.m.	No. 11 Wake Forest vs No. 14 Virginia	61–53	ACCRSN	3,619
Second round – Thursday, March 3
1	4	11:00 a.m.	No. 5 Virginia Tech vs No. 13 Clemson	82–60	ACCRSN	5,648
1	5	2:00 p.m.	No. 8 Boston College vs No. 9 Florida State	58–63	ACCRSN	5,648
2	6	6:00 p.m.	No. 7 Miami vs No. 10 Duke	61–55	ACCRSN	5,648
2	7	8:00 p.m.	No. 6 Georgia Tech vs No. 11 Wake Forest	45–40	ACCRSN	5,648
Quarterfinals – Friday, March 4
3	8	11:00 a.m.	No. 4 North Carolina vs No. 5 Virginia Tech	80–87 (OT)	ACCRSN	5,682
3	9	2:00 p.m.	No. 1 NC State vs No. 9 Florida State	84–54	ACCRSN	5,682
4	10	6:00 p.m.	No. 2 Louisville vs No. 7 Miami	59–61	ACCRSN	5,682
4	11	8:00 p.m.	No. 3 Notre Dame vs No. 6 Georgia Tech	71–53	ACCRSN	5,682
Semifinals – Saturday, March 5
5	12	Noon	No. 1 NC State vs No. 5 Virginia Tech	70–55	ACCN	7,923
5	13	2:30 p.m.	No. 3 Notre Dame vs No. 7 Miami	54–57	ACCN	7,923
Championship – Sunday, March 6
6	14	Noon	No. 1 NC State vs No. 7 Miami	60–47	ESPN	9,253
Game times in EST. Rankings denote tournament seed.

== Bracket ==
First round Wednesday, March 2
12	Syracuse	69
13	Clemson	88
10	Duke	55
15	Pittsburgh	52
11	Wake Forest	61
14	Virginia	53

Second round Thursday, March 3
8	Boston College	58
9	Florida State	63
5	Virginia Tech	82
13	Clemson	60
7	Miami	61
10	Duke	55
6	Georgia Tech	45
11	Wake Forest	40

Quarterfinals; Friday, March 4
1	NC State	84
9	Florida State	54
4	North Carolina	80
5	Virginia Tech	87*
2	Louisville	59
7	Miami	61
3	Notre Dame	71
6	Georgia Tech	53

Semifinals; Saturday, March 5
1	NC State	70
5	Virginia Tech	55
7	Miami	57
3	Notre Dame	54

Championship; Sunday, March 6
1	NC State	60
7	Miami	47

* – Denotes overtime period

== Game summaries ==
=== First round ===
ACCRSN

March 2
1:00 p.m. EST

Report

No. 12 Syracuse 69, No. 13 Clemson 88
Scoring by quarter: 16–21, 16–17, 19–20, 18–30
Pts: Hyman (25); Rebs: Styles (8); Asts: Hyman (8)	Pts: Washington (33); Rebs: Washington (11); Asts: Bradford (7)

Greensboro Coliseum
Greensboro, NC
Attendance: 3,619
Referees: Tiara Cruse
Karen Preato
Joe Vaszily

ACCRSN

March 2
3:30 p.m. EST

Report

No. 10 Duke 55, No. 15 Pittsburgh 52
Scoring by quarter: 9–20, 13–11, 17–9, 16–12
Pts: Day-Wilson (22); Rebs: Volker (8); Asts: Day-Wilson (5)	Pts: King (13); Rebs: King (9); Asts: Harris (3)

Greensboro Coliseum
Greensboro, NC
Attendance: 3,619
Referees: Katie Lukanich
Bruce Morris
Eric Brewton

ACCRSN

March 2
6:30 p.m. EST

Report

No. 11 Wake Forest 61, No. 14 Virginia 53
Scoring by quarter: 12–11, 12–18, 18–16, 19–8
Pts: Spear (23); Rebs: Morra (10); Asts: Summiel (4)	Pts: Clarkson/McLean (11); Rebs: McLean (9); Asts: Dale (3)

Greensboro Coliseum
Greensboro, NC
Attendance: 3,619
Referees: Fatou Cissoko-Stephens
Billy Smith
Mai Forsberg

=== Second round ===
ACCRSN

March 3
11:00 a.m. EST

Report

No. 5 Virginia Tech 82, No. 13 Clemson 60
Scoring by quarter: 25–15, 28–15, 16–20, 13–10
Pts: Sheppard (20); Rebs: Kitley (10); Asts: Amoore (5)	Pts: Washington (19); Rebs: Gaines/Hank (5); Asts: Bradford (4)

Greensboro Coliseum
Greensboro, NC
Attendance: 5,648
Referees: Katie Lukanich
Jeff Smith
Carla Fountain

ACCRSN

March 3
2:00 p.m. EST

Report

No. 8 Boston College 58, No. 9 Florida State 63
Scoring by quarter: 9–15, 12–14, 15–20, 22–14
Pts: Soule (16); Rebs: Gakdeng (6); Asts: Garraud (4)	Pts: Howard (16); Rebs: Howard/Jones/Myers (5); Asts: Gordon (6)

Greensboro Coliseum
Greensboro, NC
Attendance: 5,648
Referees: Talisa Green
Rod Creech
Maj Forsberg

ACCRSN

March 3
6:00 p.m. EST

Report

No. 7 Miami 61, No. 10 Duke 55
Scoring by quarter: 13–22, 14–9, 12–9, 22–15
Pts: Harden/Pendande (11); Rebs: Harden (9); Asts: Marshall (4)	Pts: Taylor (19); Rebs: Akinbode-James (9); Asts: Day-Wilson (7)

Greensboro Coliseum
Greensboro, NC
Attendance: 5,648
Referees: Joe Vaszily
Fatou Cissoko-Stephens
Mark Resch

ACCRSN

March 3
8:00 p.m. EST

Report

No. 6 Georgia Tech 45, No. 11 Wake Forest 40
Scoring by quarter: 16–6, 4–7, 9–12, 16–15
Pts: Love (16); Rebs: Strautmane (8); Asts: Lahtinen (5)	Pts: Spear (11); Rebs: Summiel (11); Asts: Spear (2)

Greensboro Coliseum
Greensboro, NC
Attendance: 5,648

=== Quarterfinals ===
ACCRSN

March 4
11:00 a.m. EST

Report

No. 4 North Carolina 80, No. 5 Virginia Tech 87 (OT)
Scoring by quarter: 21–15, 16–16, 11–19, 19–21, Overtime: 11–18
Pts: Kelly/Utsby (18); Rebs: Poole (10); Asts: Kelly (6)	Pts: Amoore/Sheppard (22); Rebs: Gregg (8); Asts: Amoore (6)

Greensboro Coliseum
Greensboro, NC
Attendance: 5,682
Referees: Carla Fountain
Eric Brewton
Maj Forsberg

ACCRSN

March 4
2:00 p.m. EST

Report

No. 1 NC State 84, No. 9 Florida State 54
Scoring by quarter: 22–15, 14–8, 24–14, 24–17
Pts: Brown-Turner/Cunane (15); Rebs: Brown-Turner/Cunane (6); Asts: Brown-Turner (6)	Pts: Bejedi (21); Rebs: Puisis (5); Asts: Gordon/Weber (2)

Greensboro Coliseum
Greensboro, NC
Attendance: 5,682
Referees: Fatou Cissoko-Stephens
Joe Vaszily
Dee Kantner

ACCRSN

March 4
6:00 p.m. EST

Report

No. 2 Louisville 59, No. 7 Miami 61
Scoring by quarter: 18–13, 13—13, 21—12, 7—23
Pts: Hall (13); Rebs: Engstler (9); Asts: Robinson (3)	Pts: Harden (27); Rebs: Harden (10); Asts: Erjavec (7)

Greensboro Coliseum
Greensboro, NC
Attendance: 5,682
Referees: Rod Creech
Mark Resch
Pualani Spurlock-Welsh

ACCRSN

March 4
8:00 p.m. EST

Report

No. 3 Notre Dame 71, No. 6 Georgia Tech 53
Scoring by quarter: 13–11, 21–14, 20–18, 17–10
Pts: Miles/Westbeld (17); Rebs: Westbeld (8); Asts: Miles (13)	Pts: Strautmane (12); Rebs: Cubaj (11); Asts: Cubaj/Love (5)

Greensboro Coliseum
Greensboro, NC
Attendance: 5,682
Referees: Denise Brooks
Jeff Smith
Talisa Green

=== Semifinals ===
ACCN

March 5
Noon EST

Report

No. 1 NC State 70, No. 5 Virginia Tech 55
Scoring by quarter: 17–13, 14–14, 23–17, 16–11
Pts: Cunane (20); Rebs: Cunane (13); Asts: Brown-Turner (6)	Pts: Traylor (18); Rebs: Gregg (6); Asts: Amoore (3)

Greensboro Coliseum
Greensboro, NC
Attendance: 7,923
Referees: Denise Brooks
Karen Preato
Pualani Spurlock-Welsh

ACCN

March 5
2:30 p.m. EST

Report

No. 3 Notre Dame 54, No. 7 Miami 57
Scoring by quarter: 4–12, 22–14, 14–20, 14–11
Pts: Westbeld (14); Rebs: Wesbeld (9); Asts: Miles (5)	Pts: Marshall (18); Rebs: Harden (7); Asts: Williams (4)

Greensboro Coliseum
Greensboro, NC
Attendance: 7,923
Referees: Dee Kantner
Carla Fountain
Tiara Cruse

=== Final ===
ESPN

March 6
Noon EST

Report

No. 1 NC State 60, No. 7 Miami 47
Scoring by quarter: 14–12, 18–11, 19–10, 9–14
Pts: Cunane (17); Rebs: Jones (10); Asts: Johnson (3)	Pts: Marshall (24); Rebs: Williams (7); Asts: Marshall (2)

Greensboro Coliseum
Greensboro, NC
Attendance: 9,253
Referees: Maj Forsberg
Joe Vaszily
Billy Smith

== All-Tournament Teams ==
2022 ACC Women's Basketball All-Tournament Teams
First Team	Second Team
Elissa Cunane – NC State (MVP) Jada Boyd – NC State Destiny Harden – Miami Kelsey Marshall – Miami Georgia Amoore – Virginia Tech	Delicia Washington – Clemson Jakia Brown-Turner – NC State Olivia Miles – Notre Dame Kayana Traylor – Virginia Tech Aisha Sheppard – Virginia Tech

== See also ==
- 2022 ACC men's basketball tournament
