= 2021–22 Boston College Eagles women's basketball team =

Intercollegiate basketball season

2021–22 Boston College Eagles women's basketball

WNIT, third round
- Conference: Atlantic Coast Conference
- Record: 21–12 (10–8 ACC)
- Head coach: Joanna Bernabei-McNamee (4th season)
- Assistant coaches: AJ Cohen; George Porcha; Lindsay Wisdom-Hylton
- Home arena: Conte Forum

2021–22 ACC women's basketball standings
	Conf.				Overall
Team	W		L	PCT	W		L	PCT
No. 3 NC State †	17	–	1	.944	32	–	4	.889
No. 4 Louisville	16	–	2	.889	29	–	5	.853
No. 17 North Carolina	13	–	5	.722	25	–	7	.781
No. 21 Notre Dame	13	–	5	.722	24	–	9	.727
No. 16 Virginia Tech	13	–	5	.722	23	–	10	.697
Georgia Tech	11	–	7	.611	21	–	11	.656
Boston College	10	–	8	.556	21	–	12	.636
Miami (FL)	10	–	8	.556	21	–	13	.618
Florida State	10	–	8	.556	17	–	14	.548
Duke	7	–	11	.389	17	–	13	.567
Wake Forest	4	–	14	.222	16	–	17	.485
Syracuse	4	–	14	.222	11	–	18	.379
Clemson	3	–	15	.167	10	–	21	.323
Pittsburgh	2	–	16	.111	11	–	19	.367
Virginia	2	–	16	.111	5	–	22	.185
† 2022 ACC tournament winner Rankings from AP poll

The 2021–22 Boston College Eagles women's basketball team represented Boston College during the 2021–22 NCAA Division I women's basketball season. The Eagles were led by fourth year head coach Joanna Bernabei-McNamee. They played their home games at the Conte Forum and were members of the Atlantic Coast Conference.

The Eagles finished the season 21–12 overall and 10–8 in ACC play to finish in a three-way tie for seventh place. As the eighth seed in the ACC tournament, they lost to Florida State in the First Round. They received an automatic bid to the WNIT where they defeated Maine in the First Round and Quinnipiac in the Second Round before losing to Columbia in the Third Round to end their season.

== Previous season ==
The Eagles finished the season 7–12 and 2–11 in ACC play to finish in a thirteenth place. In the ACC tournament, they defeated Pittsburgh in the First Round before losing to Syracuse in the Second Round. They were not invited to the NCAA tournament or the WNIT.

== Off-season ==
=== Departures ===
Departures
Name	Number	Pos.	Height	Year	Hometown	Reason for departure
Sydney McQuietor	21	F	6'2"	Freshman	Keller, Texas	Transferred to Boise State

=== Incoming transfers ===
Incoming transfers
Name	Number	Pos.	Height	Year	Hometown	Previous school
Dontavia Waggoner	0	G	6'0"	Sophomore	Nashville, Tennessee	NC State

=== Recruiting class ===
College recruiting information
Name	Hometown	School	Height	Weight	Commit date
Ally Van Timmeren; F	Allendale, Michigan	Jenison High School	6 ft 2 in (1.88 m)	N/A	
Ally Van Timmeren; F	Recruit ratings: ESPN: (91)				
Overall recruit ranking:
Note: In many cases, Scout, Rivals, 247Sports, On3, and ESPN may conflict in their listings of height and weight.; In these cases, the average was taken. ESPN grades are on a 100-point scale.; Sources:

== Roster ==
2021–22 Boston College Eagles women's basketball team
Players
Coaches

Pos.	#	Name	Height	Year	Previous school	Hometown
G	0	Dontavia Waggoner	6 ft 0 in (1.83 m)	So	The Ensworth School	Nashville, TN
G	1	Cameron Swartz	5 ft 11 in (1.8 m)	Sr	Fellowship Christian School	Marietta, GA
G	2	Kaylah Ivey	5 ft 8 in (1.73 m)	So	Riverdale Baptist School	Forestville, MD
G/F	3	Jaelyn Batts	6 ft 0 in (1.83 m)	Jr	Freedom	South Riding, VA
G/F	4	JoJo Lacey	6 ft 1 in (1.85 m)	So	Westtown School	Douglassville, PA
F/C	5	Maria Gakdeng	6 ft 3 in (1.91 m)	Fr	New Hope Academy	Lanham, MD
G	10	Makayla Dickens	5 ft 8 in (1.73 m)	Sr	Princess Anne	Virginia Beach, VA
G	11	Amaria Fields	5 ft 11 in (1.8 m)	Fr	McKinney North	McKinney, TX
F	12	Ally Van Timmeren	6 ft 2 in (1.88 m)	Fr	Jenison	Allendale, MI
F	13	Taylor Soule	5 ft 11 in (1.8 m)	Sr	Kimball Union Academy	Lebanon, NH
G	14	Marnelle Garraud	5 ft 7 in (1.7 m)	Sr	Noble and Greenough School	Lynn, MA
G	21	Andrea Daley	6 ft 0 in (1.83 m)	Fr	Miami Country Day	Miami, FL
G	24	Allie Palmieri	5 ft 10 in (1.78 m)	Fr	Greens Farms Academy	Trumbull, CT
C	32	Clara Ford	6 ft 3 in (1.91 m)	Sr	George C. Marshall	Vienna, VA
C	44	Akunna Konkwo	6 ft 2 in (1.88 m)	RS So	Bishop Ireton	Alexandria, VA

Head coach

- Joanna Bernabei-McNamee (West Liberty)

Assistant coach(es)

- AJ Cohen (Louisville)
- George Porcha (New Haven)
- Lindsay Wisdom-Hylton (Purdue)

Legend

- (C) Team captain
- (S) Suspended
- (I) Ineligible
- (W) Walk-on
- Injured
- Current redshirt

Roster
Last update: October 21, 2021

== Schedule ==
Date time, TV	Rank^{#}	Opponent^{#}	Result	Record	Site (attendance) city, state
Regular season
November 9, 2021*; 4:30 p.m., ACCNX		Harvard	W 86–60	1–0	Conte Forum (739); Chestnut Hill, MA
November 13, 2021*; 1:00 p.m., ACCNX		Holy Cross	W 75–50	2–0	Conte Forum (853); Chestnut Hill, MA
November 17, 2021*; 6:00 p.m., ESPN+		at Boston University	L 65–69	2–1	Case Gym (490); Boston, MA
November 20, 2021*; 1:00 p.m.		at Providence	W 85–73	3–1	Alumni Hall (426); Providence, RI
November 24, 2021*; 2:00 p.m., ACCNX		Northeastern	W 57–46	4–1	Conte Forum (522); Chestnut Hill, MA
November 28, 2021*; Noon, ACCNX		Albany	W 77–65	5–1	Conte Forum (599); Chestnut Hill, MA
December 2, 2021*; 1:00 p.m., ACCN		Penn State; ACC–Big Ten Women's Challenge	W 86–69	6–1	Conte Forum (833); Chestnut Hill, MA
December 5, 2021*; 1:00 p.m., ESPN+		at VCU	L 65–69	6–2	Siegel Center (469); Richmond, VA
December 8, 2021*; 7:00 p.m., ESPN+		at UMass	W 66–60	7–2	Mullins Center (958); Amherst, MA
December 11, 2021*; 4:00 p.m., ACCN		New Hampshire	Postponted		Conte Forum; Chestnut Hill, MA
December 19, 2021; 2:00 p.m., ACCNX		No. 25 North Carolina	L 73-76	7–3 (0–1)	Conte Forum (1,327); Chestnut Hill, MA
December 21, 2021*; 11:00 a.m., ACCNX		Sacred Heart	W 97–68	8–3	Conte Forum (869); Chestnut Hill, MA
December 30, 2021; 7:00 p.m., ACCNX		at No. 3 Louisville	L 49–79	8–4 (0–2)	KFC Yum! Center (7,709); Louisville, KY
January 1, 2022*; 2:00 p.m., ACCNX		New Hampshire	W 88–52	9–4	Conte Forum (345); Chestnut Hill, MA
January 2, 2022; 2:00 p.m., ACCNX		Pittsburgh	Postponed		Conte Forum; Chestnut Hill, MA
January 6, 2022; 7:00 p.m., ACCNX		Syracuse	W 95–71	10–4 (1–2)	Conte Forum (424); Chestnut Hill, MA
January 9, 2022; Noon, NESN		at Clemson	W 70–64	11–4 (2–2)	Littlejohn Coliseum (512); Clemson, SC
January 13, 2022; 6:00 p.m., ACCNX		at Pittsburgh	W 75–64	12–4 (3–2)	Peterson Events Center (1,131); Pittsburgh, PA
January 16, 2022; Noon, ACCN		No. 3 Louisville	L 53–63	12–5 (3–3)	Conte Forum (1,066); Chestnut Hill, MA
January 20, 2022; 6:00 p.m., NESN		No. 19 Notre Dame	W 73–71	13–5 (4–3)	Conte Forum (1,017); Chestnut Hill, MA
January 23, 2022; Noon, NESN		Miami (FL)	W 79–66	14–5 (5–3)	Conte Forum (914); Chestnut Hill, MA
January 27, 2022; 7:00 p.m., ACCNX		at No. 14 Georgia Tech	L 49–68	14–6 (5–4)	McCamish Pavilion (1,528); Atlanta, GA
January 30, 2022; 2:00 p.m., ACCN		at No. 20 Notre Dame	L 61–74	14–7 (5–5)	Purcell Pavilion (5,584); Notre Dame, IN
February 3, 2022; 7:00 p.m., ACCNX		Virginia	W 65–57	15–7 (6–5)	Conte Forum (736); Chestnut Hill, MA
February 6, 2022; 2:00 p.m., NESN		at Virginia Tech	L 62–85	15–8 (6–6)	Cassell Coliseum (1,649); Blacksburg, VA
February 10, 2022; 6:00 p.m., ACCN		No. 5 NC State	L 78–85 ^{OT}	15–9 (6–7)	Conte Forum (2,547); Chestnut Hill, MA
February 15, 2022; 7:00 p.m., ACCNX		Pittsburgh	W 69–57	16–9 (7–7)	Conte Forum (621); Chestnut Hill, MA
February 17, 2022; 7:00 p.m., ACCNX		at Florida State	L 58–66	16–10 (7–8)	Donald L. Tucker Center (2,049); Tallahassee, FL
February 20, 2022; Noon, ACCN		Wake Forest	W 82–70	17–10 (8–8)	Conte Forum; Chestnut Hill, MA
February 24, 2022; 8:00 p.m., NESN		at Duke	W 67–51	18–10 (9–8)	Cameron Indoor Stadium (2,582); Durham, NC
February 27, 2022; Noon, ACCN		at Syracuse	W 91–75	19–10 (10–8)	Carrier Dome (1,214); Syracuse, NY
ACC Women's Tournament
March 3, 2022; 2:00 p.m., ACCRSN	(8)	vs. (9) Florida State; Second Round	L 58–63	19–11	Greensboro Coliseum (5,648); Greensboro, NC
WNIT
March 17, 2022; 7:00 p.m., ACCNX		Maine; First Round	W 69–44	20–11	Conte Forum (503); Chestnut Hill, MA
March 21, 2022; 7:00 p.m., ACCNX		Quinnipiac; Second Round	W 94–68	21–11	Conte Forum (424); Chestnut Hill, MA
March 24, 2022; 7:00 p.m., ESPN+		at Columbia; Third Round	L 51–54	21–12	Levien Gymnasium (1,075); New York City, NY
*Non-conference game. ^{#}Rankings from AP Poll. (#) Tournament seedings in parentheses. All times are in Eastern.

== Rankings ==
Regular season polls
Poll	Pre- Season	Week 2	Week 3	Week 4	Week 5	Week 6	Week 7	Week 8	Week 9	Week 10	Week 11	Week 12	Week 13	Week 14	Week 15	Week 16	Week 17	Week 18	Final
AP																			
Coaches																			

Legend
	Increase in ranking
	Decrease in ranking
	Not ranked in previous week
(RV)	Received Votes
(NR)	Not Ranked

Coaches did not release a Week 2 poll and AP does not release a poll after the NCAA Tournament.

== See also ==
- 2021–22 Boston College Eagles men's basketball team
