= ACC on Regional Sports Networks =

US sports telecasts

ACC RSN
- Country: United States
- Availability: Regional
- Broadcast area: United States
- Owner: Raycom Sports
- Parent: Gray Television
- Key people: Ken Haines; (President & CEO, Raycom Sports); John Swofford; (Commissioner of the ACC); John Skipper; (President, ESPN Inc.)
- Launch date: 2011
- Dissolved: June 2023
- Official website: www.theacc.com www.raycomsports.com

The ACC on Regional Sports Networks (also known as simply ACC RSN) was a package of telecasts produced by Raycom Sports, in cooperation with Bally Sports, previously the Fox Sports Networks, featuring Atlantic Coast Conference (ACC) college sports. The package was syndicated primarily to regional sports networks.

== History ==
The practice of distributing ACC sports telecasts to regional networks began with the original Jefferson-Pilot syndication package for football and Raycom/JP package for basketball in the 1980s. At that time Raycom and JP would distribute ACC telecasts through AT&T network lines to local over the air affiliates. Raycom Sports would continue to distribute ACC telecasts, mostly football and men's basketball under what became the ACC Network, to over the air affiliates until the 2019 ACC men's basketball tournament, when ESPN acquired Raycom Sports' previous package of games for its new ACC Network cable channel.

The practice of distributing ACC sports to regional sports networks started in 2011 after the signing of a new 12-year agreement between the ACC, ESPN and Raycom Sports. The agreement gave Raycom Sports the ability to syndicate a select number of football, basketball and Olympic sports on regional sports networks.

As the majority of the ACC's RSN affiliates were part of Fox Sports Networks, these events were initially billed as Fox Sports telecasts (with football and basketball using the standard Fox College Football and Fox College Hoops branding respectively). With the acquisition of FSN by Sinclair Broadcast Group and their rebranding in late-March 2021, the telecasts transitioned to using Bally Sports' on-air presentation.

In August 2022, Bally and Raycom agreed to move 11 women’s basketball tournament early-round games and 12 baseball tournament early-round games, which previously aired as part of the package, to the ACC Network.

In June 2023, as part of the bankruptcy of Diamond Sports Group, Bally dropped the ACC RSN package. A month later, Raycom announced an agreement with The CW to carry a sub-license package of ACC telecasts produced by Raycom, which will include 13 football games, 28 men's basketball games, and 9 women's basketball games per-season. The broadcasts were initially branded as the ACC on The CW. Beginning in the 2024 football season, the Raycom-produced football games became part of the new CW Football Saturday banner alongside a new Pac-12 package, with ex-Pac-12 Network staff producing its studio coverage and conference games.

== Telecasts ==
The ACC on Regional Sports Networks consisted of football, men's and women's basketball, baseball, softball, and a limited number of soccer, field hockey, and volleyball matches. The package contains around 16 football games per year, around 40 men's basketball games, and 25 women's basketball games.

It previously aired early-round coverage of the ACC women's basketball tournament and ACC baseball tournament until 2022, when ESPN reached an agreement with Raycom Sports and Bally Sports to move coverage of these two events to ACC Network.

== On air staff ==
- Mike Gminski: color commentar
- Tom Werme: play-by-play
- Cory Alexander: color commentator
- James Bates: color commentator
- Evan Lepler: play-by-play
- Charles Arbuckle: color commentator
- Treavor Scales: sideline reporter
- Bob Rathbun: play-by-play
- Brian Jordan: color commentator
- Tabitha Turner: sideline reporter
- Eric Collins: play-by-play
- Dan Bonner: color commentator

== See also ==
- MVC Network, a similar package of telecasts on regional sports networks for the Missouri Valley Conference
- The CW Sports
