= 2021–22 Gonzaga Bulldogs women's basketball team =

American college basketball season

2021–22 Gonzaga Bulldogs women's basketball

West Coast Conference tournament champions

NCAA tournament, second round
- Conference: West Coast Conference

Ranking
- Coaches: No. RV
- AP: No. RV
- Record: 27–7 (15–2 WCC)
- Head coach: Lisa Fortier (8th season)
- Assistant coaches: Jordan Green; Stacy Clinesmith; Craig Fortier
- Home arena: McCarthey Athletic Center

2021–22 West Coast Conference women's basketball standings
	Conf.				Overall
Team	W		L	PCT	W		L	PCT
No. 20 BYU	15	–	1	.938	26	–	4	.867
Gonzaga †	15	–	2	.882	27	–	7	.794
San Francisco	10	–	8	.556	17	–	16	.515
Portland	8	–	7	.533	20	–	11	.645
Saint Mary's	9	–	9	.500	18	–	15	.545
San Diego	8	–	9	.471	17	–	15	.531
Santa Clara	8	–	10	.444	16	–	15	.516
Pepperdine	4	–	11	.267	8	–	17	.320
Loyola Marymount	4	–	13	.235	11	–	19	.367
Pacific	3	–	14	.176	6	–	23	.207
† 2022 WCC tournament winner Rankings from AP poll

The 2021–22 Gonzaga Bulldogs women's basketball team represented Gonzaga University in the 2021–22 NCAA Division I women's basketball season. The Bulldogs (also informally referred to as the "Zags"), were members of the West Coast Conference. The Bulldogs, led by eighth year head coach Lisa Fortier, played their home games at the McCarthey Athletic Center on the university campus in Spokane, Washington.

== Roster ==
2021–22 Gonzaga Bulldogs women's basketball team
Players
Coaches

Pos.	#	Name	Height	Year	Previous school	Hometown
F	0	Esther Little	6 ft 2 in (1.88 m)	RS Fr	Ipswich Basketball Academy	Ipswich, England
F	1	Anamaria Virjoghe	6 ft 5 in (1.96 m)	RS Sr	Voievodul Mercea; Northwest Christian	Târgoviște, Romania
F	3	Payton Muma	5 ft 8 in (1.73 m)	Fr	Highlands Ranch	Highlands Ranch, CO
G/F	4	Abby O'Connor	6 ft 0 in (1.83 m)	Sr	St. Joseph; Loyola–Chicago	South Bend, IN
G	5	Maud Huijbens	6 ft 3 in (1.91 m)	Fr	N/A; Syracuse	Hilversum, Netherlands
F	10	Calli Stokes	5 ft 11 in (1.8 m)	Fr	Redondo	Redondo Beach, CA
G	11	Kayleigh Truong	5 ft 9 in (1.75 m)	Jr	Jersey Village	Houston, TX
F	12	Eliza Hollingsworth	6 ft 2 in (1.88 m)	RS So	St Leonard's College	Melbourne, Australia
G	13	Cierra Walker	5 ft 8 in (1.73 m)	RS Sr	Oregon City; Vanderbilt	Oregon City, OR
G	14	Kaylynne Truong	5 ft 8 in (1.73 m)	Jr	Jersey Village	Houston, TX
F	15	Yvonne Ejim	6 ft 1 in (1.85 m)	So	Edge School	Calgary, AB
G	24	McKayla Williams	6 ft 1 in (1.85 m)	So	Windward	Los Angeles, CA
G	32	Kylee Griffen	6 ft 2 in (1.88 m)	RS Sr	Lake Stevens	Marysville, WA
F	33	Melody Kempton	6 ft 1 in (1.85 m)	Sr	Post Falls	Post Falls, ID
G	35	Bree Salenbien	6 ft 2 in (1.88 m)	RS Fr	Lenawee Christian	Adrian, MI

Head coach

- Lisa Fortier (Cal State Monterey)

Assistant coach(es)

- Jordan Green (George Fox)
- Stacy Clinesmith (UC Santa Barbara)
- Craig Fortier (Cal State Monterey)

Legend

- (C) Team captain
- (S) Suspended
- (I) Ineligible
- (W) Walk-on
- Injured
- Current redshirt

Roster

== Schedule ==
Date time, TV	Rank^{#}	Opponent^{#}	Result	Record	Site (attendance) city, state
Exhibition
Nov. 6, 2021*; 2:00 pm		Central Washington	W 78–42	–	McCarthey Athletic Center (2,887); Spokane, WA
Non Conference regular season
Nov. 11, 2021*; 6:00 pm		Montana State	W 72–47	1–0	McCarthey Athletic Center (3,301); Spokane, WA
Nov. 14, 2021*; 1:00 pm, SWX		at Montana	W 67–60	2–0	Dahlberg Arena (2,844); Missoula, MT
Nov. 18, 2021*; 6:00 pm		Idaho State	W 69–39	3–0	McCarthey Athletic Center (2,821); Spokane, WA
Nov. 21, 2021*; 1:00 pm, SWX		No. 7 Stanford	L 62–66	3–1	McCarthey Athletic Center (6,000); Spokane, WA
Nov 26, 2021*; 2:00 pm		vs. Utah; Rainbow Wahine Showdown	W 89-71	4-1	Stan Sheriff Center; Manoa, HI
Nov 27, 2021*; 2:00 pm		vs. Eastern Illinois; Rainbow Wahine Showdown	W 74-53	5-1	Stan Sheriff Center; Manoa, HI
Nov 28, 2021*; 4:30 pm, SPEC on ESPN+		at Hawaii; Rainbow Wahine Showdown	W 68-49	6-1	Stan Sheriff Center (1,017); Manoa, HI
Dec 3, 2021*; 6:00 pm		Wyoming	W 54-47	7-1	McCarthey Athletic Center (3,171); Spokane, WA
Dec 8, 2021*; 6:00 pm, SWX; SCSP		Washington State	L 51-49	7-2	McCarthey Athletic Center (3,469); Spokane, WA
Dec 12, 2021*; 6:30 pm, SCSA		Stephen F. Austin	W 64-54	8-2	McCarthey Athletic Center (2,751); Spokane, WA
Dec 19, 2021*; 2:00 pm, ESPN+		at UC Davis	L 69-66	8-3	University Credit Union Center (726); Davis, CA
Dec 21, 2021*; 6:00 pm, SWX		at Eastern Washington	W 76–48	9–3	Reese Court (1,021); Cheney, WA
WCC regular season
Jan 1, 2022; 1:00 pm		at Loyola Marymount	Canceled due to COVID-19 issues		Gersten Pavilion; Los Angeles, CA
Jan 6, 2022; 7:00 pm		at Portland	W 76-65	10-3 (1-0)	Chiles Center (532); Portland
Jan 9, 2022*; 3:00 pm		at No. 2 Stanford	L 66-50	10-4	Maples Pavilion (0); Stanford, California
Jan 13, 2022; 7:00 pm		at Pacific	W 92-51	11-4 (2–0)	Alex G. Spanos Center (377); Stockton, CA
Jan 15, 2022; 2:00 pm, SWX		San Diego	W 76-66	12-4 (3-0)	McCarthey Athletic Center (4,971); Spokane, WA
Jan 20, 2022; 6:00 pm		Portland	W 68-59	13-4 (4-0)	McCarthey Athletic Center (5,119); Spokane, WA
Jan 22, 2022; 1:00 pm		at St. Mary's	W 66-53	14-4 (5-0)	University Credit Union Pavilion (314); Moraga, CA
Jan 27, 2022; 7:00 pm		at Pepperdine	W 66-54	15-4 (6-0)	Firestone Fieldhouse (203); Malibu, CA
Jan 29, 2022; 2:00 pm		at San Diego	W 69-43	16-4 (7-0)	Jenny Craig Pavilion (291); San Diego, CA
Feb 3, 2022; 6:00 pm		Pacific	W 79-38	17-4 (8-0)	McCarthey Athletic Center (4,882); Spokane, WA
Feb 5, 2022; 2:00 pm, ROOT		No. 16 BYU	L 50–62	17–5 (8–1)	McCarthey Athletic Center (5,503); Spokane, WA
Feb 7, 2022; 6:00 pm		San Francisco; Rescheduled from December 30	W 55-49	18-5 (9-1)	McCarthey Athletic Center (4,847); Spokane, WA
Feb 10, 2022; 6:00 pm, SCSC		at Santa Clara	W 72-55	19-5 (10-1)	Leavey Center (0); Santa Clara, CA
Feb 12, 2022; 2:00 pm		at San Francisco	W 83-82	20-5 (11-1)	The Sobrato Center (832); San Francisco, CA
Feb 17, 2022; 6:00 pm		St. Mary's	W 85-49	21-5 (12-1)	McCarthey Athletic Center (4,980); Spokane, WA
Feb 19, 2022; 1:00 pm, BYUtv		at No. 20 BYU	L 63-39	21-6 (12-2)	Marriott Center (6,289); Provo, UT
Feb 21, 2022; 2:00 pm		Santa Clara; Rescheduled from January 8	W 74-58	22-6 (13-2)	McCarthey Athletic Center (5,047); Spokane, WA
Feb 24, 2022; 6:00 pm, SWX		Pepperdine	W 85-41	23-6 (14-2)	McCarthey Athletic Center (4,966); Spokane, WA
Feb 26, 2022; 2:00 pm, SWX		Loyola Marymount	W 83-62	24-6 (15-2)	McCarthey Athletic Center (5,386); Spokane, WA
WCC Tournament
Mar 7, 2022; 2:30 pm, ROOT, BYUtv, WCC Network		vs. San Francisco; Semifinals	W 69-55	25-6 (15-2)	Orleans Arena; Las Vegas, NV
Mar 8, 2022; 1:00 pm, ESPNU		vs. BYU; Championship	W 71-59	26-6 (15-2)	Orleans Arena; Las Vegas, NV
NCAA tournament
Mar 18, 2022*; 12:30 pm, ESPNews	(9 W)	vs. (8 W) Nebraska; First Round	W 68-55	27-6	KFC Yum! Center; Louisville, KY
Mar 20, 2022*; 4:00 pm, ESPN	(9 W)	at (1 W) No. 4 Louisville; Second Round	L 59-68	27-7	KFC Yum! Center (10,414); Louisville, KY
*Non-conference game. ^{#}Rankings from AP Poll. (#) Tournament seedings in parentheses. W=Wichita. All times are in Pacific Time Zone.

== Rankings ==
2021–22 NCAA Division I women's basketball rankings

+ Regular season polls	Poll	Pre- Season	Week 2	Week 3	Week 4	Week 5	Week 6	Week 7	Week 8	Week 9	Week 10	Week 11	Week 12	Week 13	Week 14	Week 15	Week 16	Week 17	Week 18	Week 19	Final
AP																				N/A	
Coaches																					

Legend
	Increase in ranking
	Decrease in ranking
	No change
(RV)	Received votes
(NR)	Not ranked

^Coaches did not release a Week 2 poll.

== See also ==
- 2021–22 Gonzaga Bulldogs men's basketball team
