= Lyonia =

Lyonia may refer to:

- Lyonia (brachiopod), a fossil genus of brachiopods in the family Monticuliferidae
- Lyonia (plant), a genus of flowering plants in the family Ericaceae
- Lyonia (journal), a former journal on ecological research from the University of Hawaii
