= Mānoa Falls Trail =

Hiking trail on the island of Oahu in Hawaii

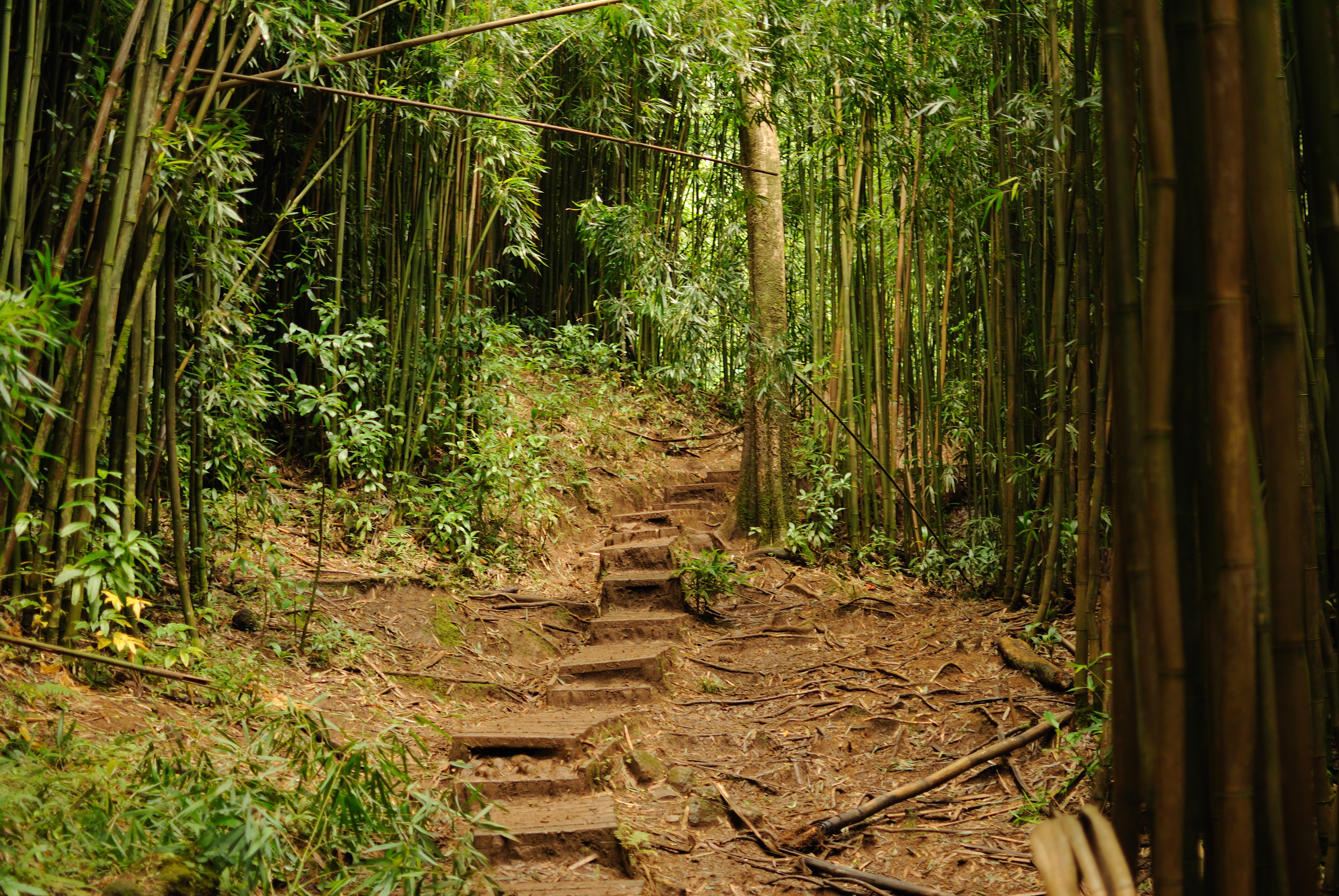
- Manoa Falls Trail
- Length: 1.6 miles (2.6 km) Round Trip
- Location: Oahu, Hawaii
- Use: Hiking
- Difficulty: Some may say that this trail is "Easy". However, there is currently no formal way of rating trails. Therefore, since the trail can be very slippery when wet the rating can be subjective. Thus, users should use caution on any trail and turn around if not comfortable.
- Season: Year around - Sun up to sundown - Not recommended to start the hike after 5 pm
- Hazards: Leptospirosis, flash floods Slippery
- Maintained by: State of Hawaii Oahu Division of Forestry and Wildlife $5 usage fee or Free if parking in the lower neighbourhood
- Website: hawaiitrails.hawaii.gov

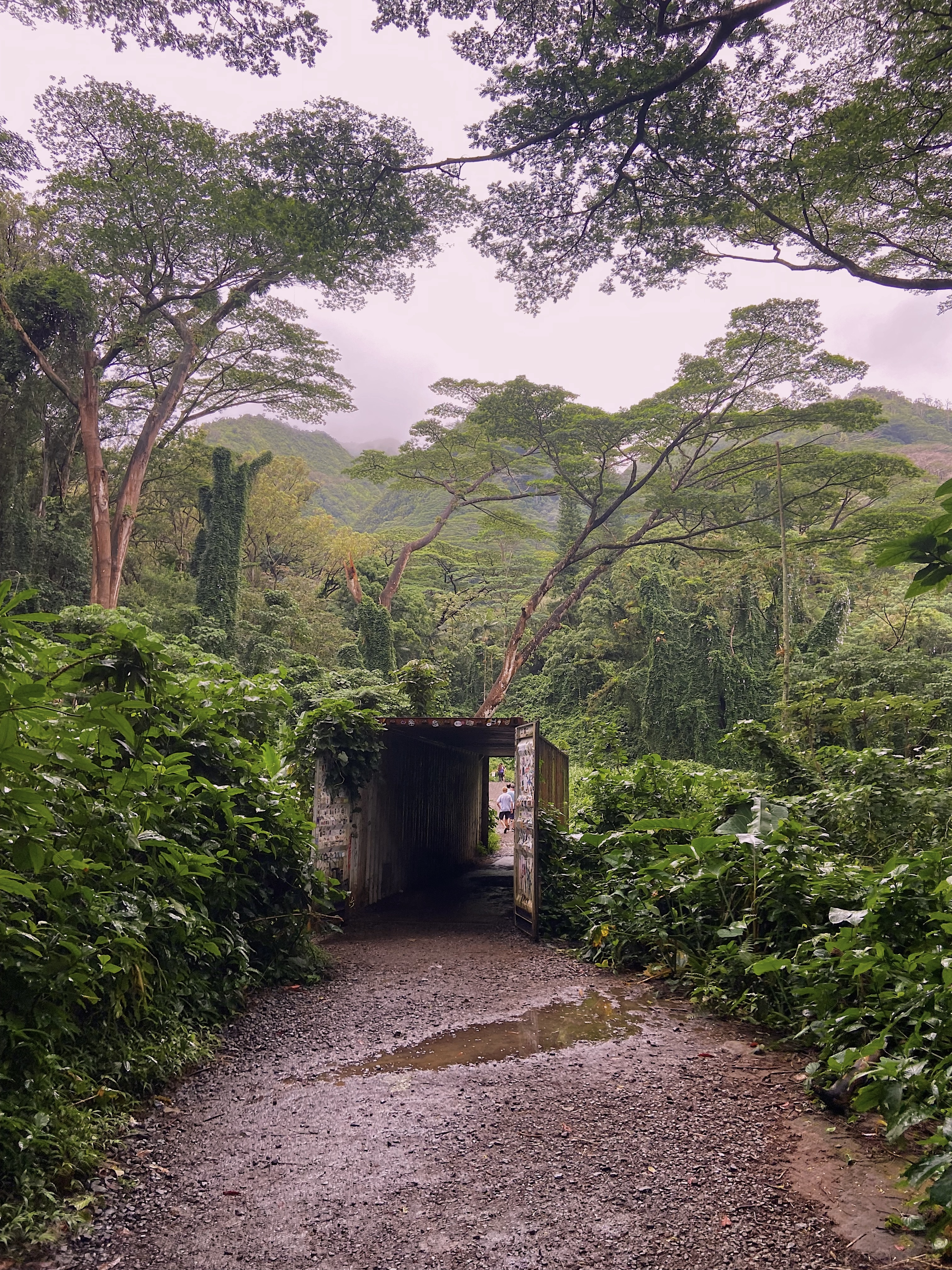
One of the many views that you can see at the entrance of the trail

Mānoa Falls Trail is a 1.6-mile (2.6 km) trail on the island of Oahu in Hawaii. The trail is a part of the Honolulu Makau Trail System, and leads to a popular 150-foot (46 m) waterfall called Manoa Falls. Hiking the trail is approximately a one-hour round trip. Many tourists are attracted to the waterfall and scenery throughout the trail. The trails have a history as one of the earlier Hawaiian trails. There are many legends of the Night Marchers, or ancient Hawaiian warriors associated with Manoa Falls. Scenes in movies such as Jurassic Park and Catching Fire were filmed at Manoa Falls. The Manoa Falls trail harbors many plant species and tropical birds as well. The Lyon Arboretum, located in the Manoa Valley at the base of the trail is another popular tourist attraction and aims to preserve endangered Hawaiian plants. Some may say that this trail is "Easy". However, there is currently no formal way of rating trails. Therefore, since the trail can be very slippery when wet the rating can be subjective. Thus, users should use caution on any trail and turn around if not comfortable. Rain showers are very common on the trail and the path to the waterfall is often muddy and slippery. Flash floods may also occur at any time. Swimming in the pools of water on the trail is highly discouraged due to the threat of Leptospirosis.

== Location ==
=== Manoa Falls Trail ===
The Manoa Falls Trail is a 1.6-mile (2.6 km) trail (round trip) that is a part of the Honolulu Makau Trail System, which consists of 17 other trails in close proximity. The Manoa Falls trail also includes the Manoa Valley, and the Lyon Arboretum. Many people hike the trail to see the Manoa Falls, a 150-foot (46 m) waterfall that empties into a small pool of water. The location is often referred to as the "Rainbow Valley", because of the frequent rainbows. The Manoa valley and the surrounding area is considered a tropical rainforest. The Manoa Falls Trail is very humid and frequent rain showers throughout the area are very common. This climate allows for an abundance of plants and wildlife. The trail, specifically near the waterfall is normally damp and muddy.

=== Manoa, Oahu ===
The Manoa Falls trail is located in the valley of Manoa which receives rain almost every day resulting in the valley being richly vegetated. Rainbows are common and is a source of The University of Hawaii at Manoa sport teams names, the Rainbow Warriors (men) and Rainbow Wahines (women). College students visit the Manoa Falls trail often for research and educational purposes.

=== Nearby Trails ===
The Manoa Falls trail is part of the Honolulu Mauka Trail System. This system consists of 18 trails surrounding the Honolulu area.

1. Tantalus Arboretum Trail (0.25 mi / 0.4 km)
2. Kanealole Trail (0.7 mi / 1.1 km)
3. Maunalaha Trail (0.7 mi / 1.1 km)
4. Nahuina Trail (0.75 mi / 1.2 km)
5. Makiki Valley Trail (1.1 mi / 1.8 km)
6. Ualaka’a Trail (0.5 mi / 0.85 km)
7. Moleka Trail (0.75 mi / 1.2 km)
8. Manoa Cliff Trail (2.3 mi / 3.7 km)
9. Pu’u Ohia Trail (0.75 mi / 1.2 km)
10. Pauoa Flats Trail (0.75 mi / 1.2 km)
11. Nu’uanu Trail (1.5 mi / 2.4 km)
12. Judd Trail (0.75 mi / 1.2 km)
13. Aihualama Trail (1.3 mi / 2.1 km)
14. Manoa Falls Trail (0.8 mi / 1.3 km)
15. Kolowalu Trail (1.0 mi / 1.6 km)
16. Wa’ahila Trail (2.4 mi / 0.6 km)
17. Pu’u Pia Trail (0.75 mi / 1.2 km)
18. Kalawahine Trail (1.5 mi / 2.4 km)
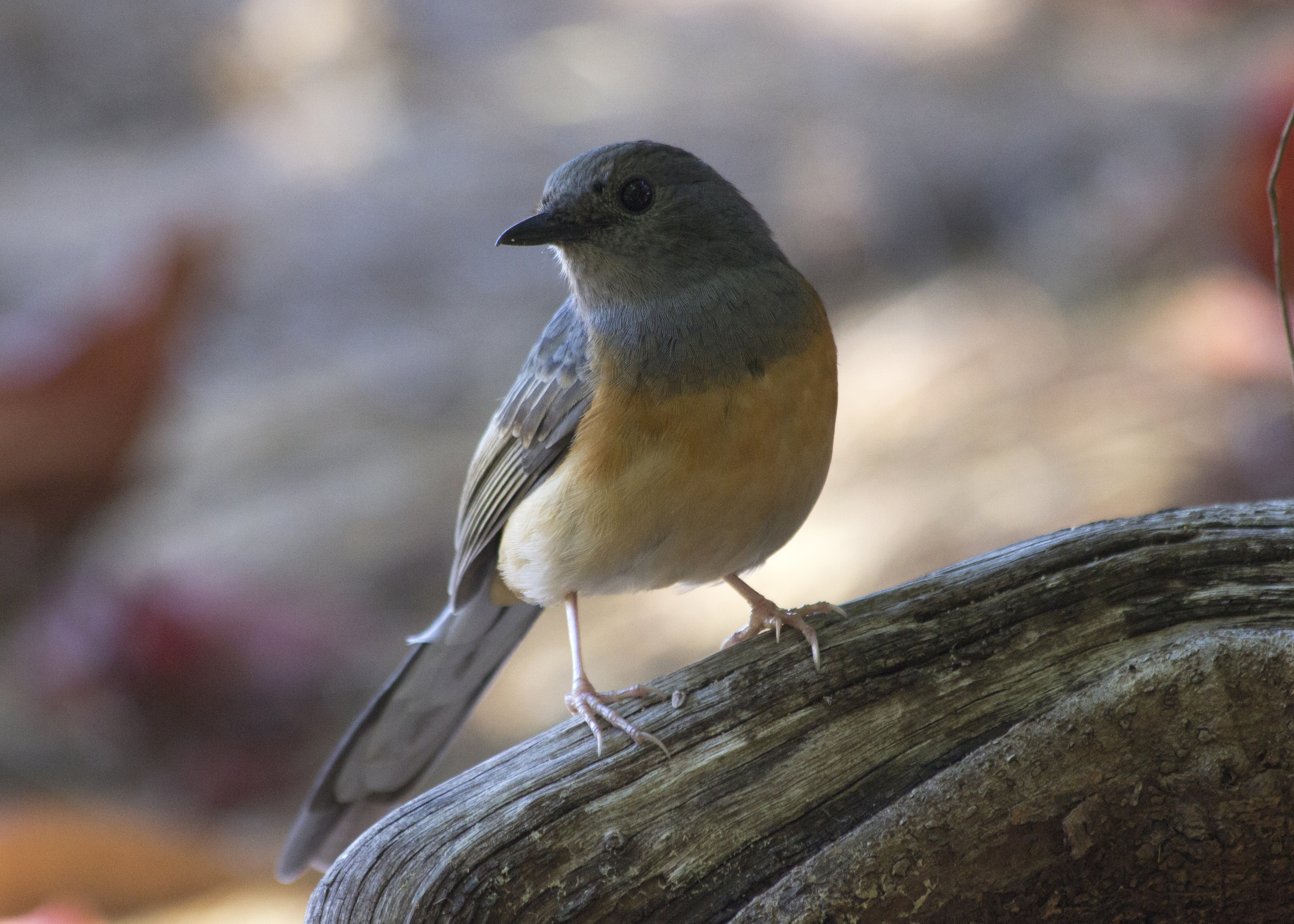
  A Shama, a tropical bird commonly found throughout the Manoa Falls Trail.

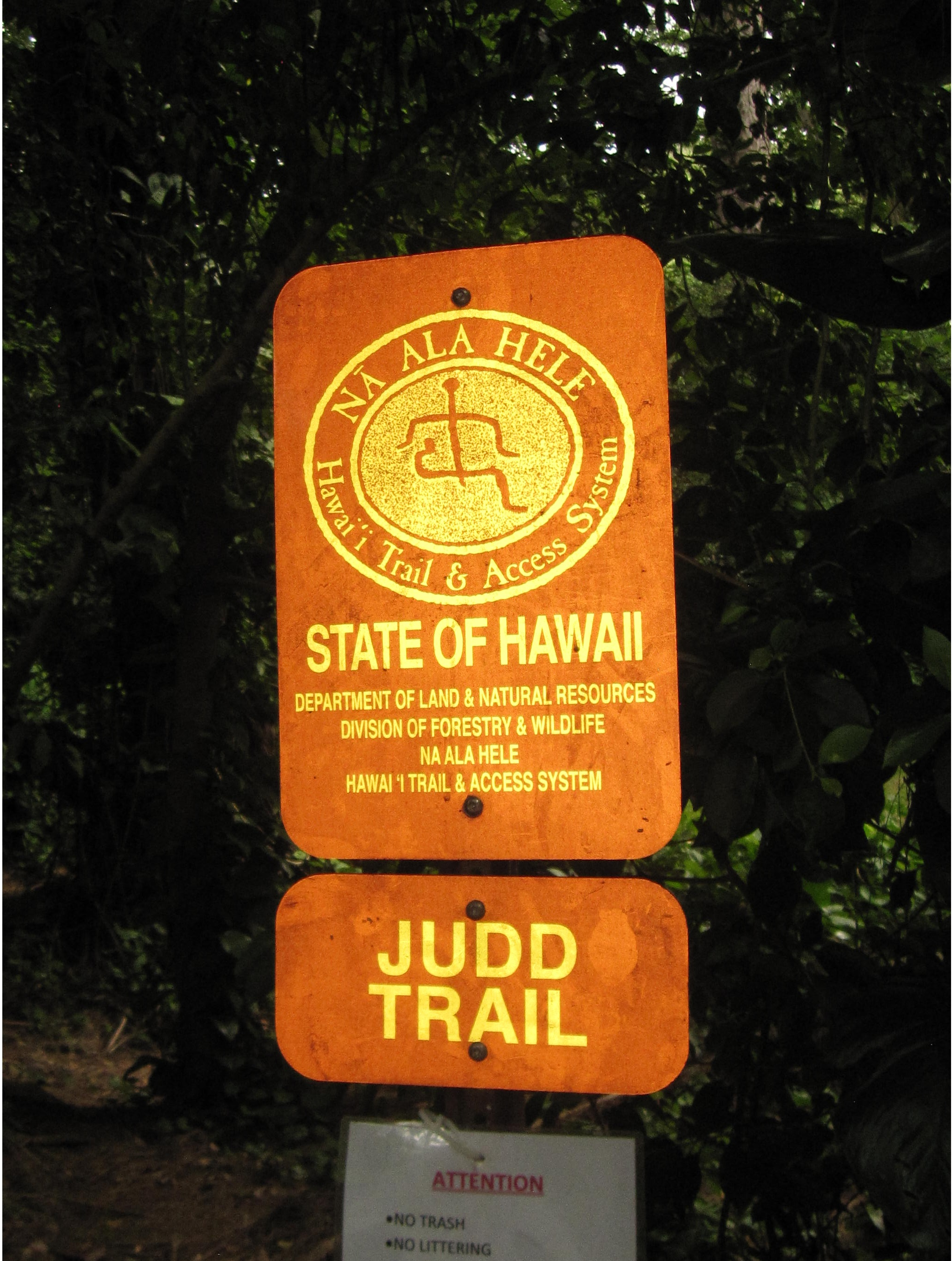
Sign for Judd Trail

=== Ecology ===
Tropical birds such as the Shama, a chestnut colored bird with a black and white tail inhabit the trails. The trail also contains many ferns, ginger plants, banyan trees, eucalyptus trees, bamboo trees, and hau trees. The hau trees can be distinguished by their flowers which are bright yellow with a dark red center, very similar to those of other hibiscus species.

== History and culture ==
The Manoa Falls Trail was one of the earlier Hawaiian trails and it was most likely used for hunting, bathing, gathering plants, and wood. The wood found on the trails was used by earlier Hawaiians for making canoes, the bark was sometimes used for sandals, and the tree sap was used as a laxative.

=== Night marchers ===
Stories and legends have long been linked to Manoa Falls. The legend of the Night Marchers is one of the most evocative. The Night Marchers, or the Phantom Marchers are said to be the Spirits of Ancient Hawaiian Warriors. As the legend tells, the direct path of the Night Marchers is the Banyan Tree located in the beginning of the Manoa Falls Trail. It is said the Night Marchers haunt the Manoa Falls Trail and the sounds of banshee screams can be heard as you hike the trail.

=== Appearance in movies and television series ===
In the movie Jurassic Park Manoa Falls was used was a filming location. Additionally, Manoa Falls was used as a filming location in the movie Catching Fire, featured as the film's jungle arena. Manoa Falls was also used to film scenes in the television shows Lost and Hawaii Five-0 .

=== Deaths and injuries ===
On April 12, 2012, Phillip S. Mann from Scottsmoor, FL fell down the falls during an evening hike alone. Hikers heard cries for help that evening, but search parties did not locate a person. The following day, hikers discovered his body at the bottom of the river bed. The young man likely died on impact.

On June 15, 2016 19-year-old Kristi Takanishi, a 2015 valedictorian from Kaiser high school in Honolulu Hawaii, fell from the top of Manoa Falls and died two days later. Sources say she was taking pictures with friends when she slipped and fell off the edge, 200 ft down the waterfall into the small pool of water. Cause of death was determined to be blunt force trauma to the head.

== Tourism ==
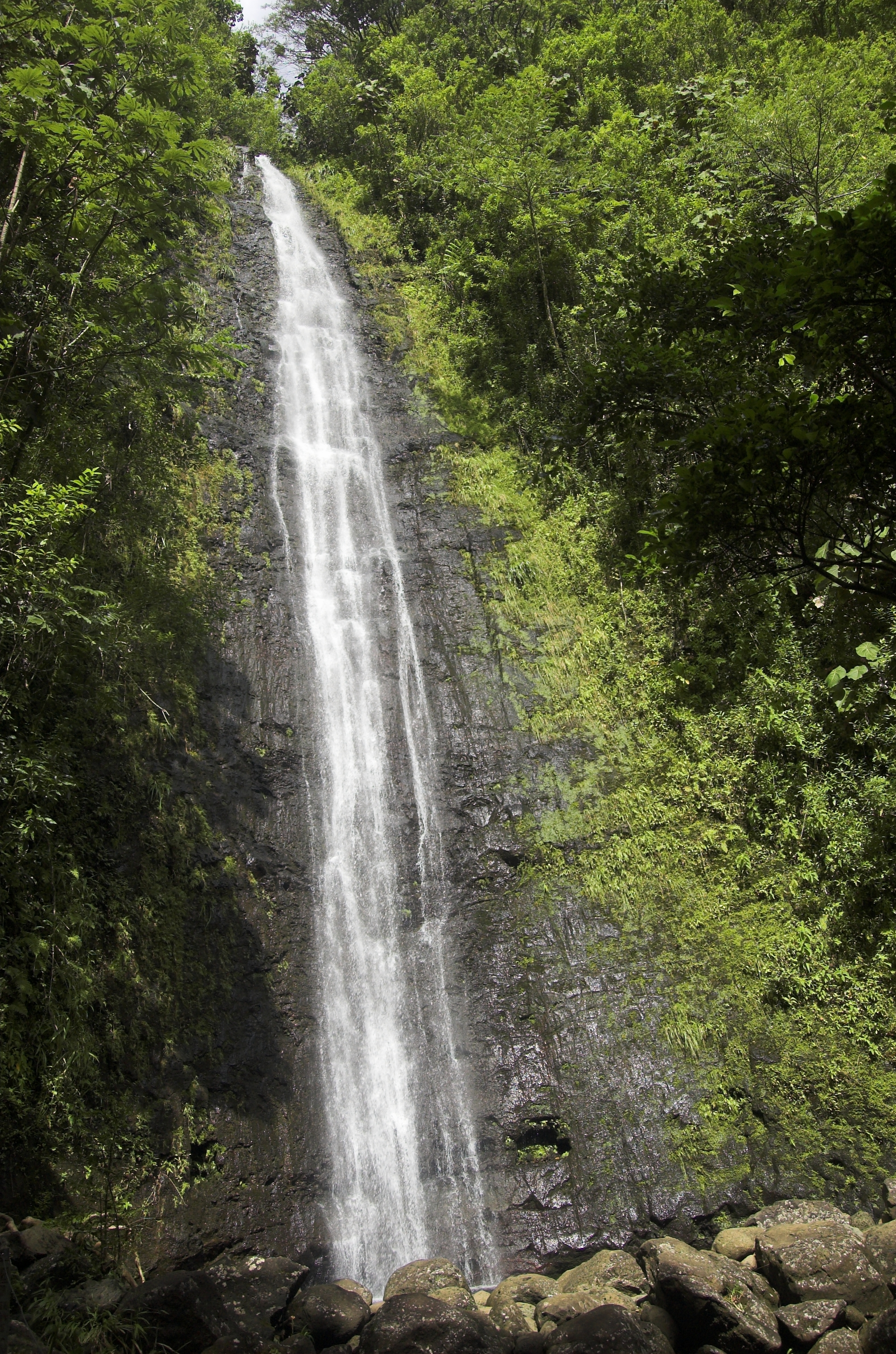
Manoa Falls

Manoa falls is the second most popular trail on the island of Oahu. There is less water in the waterfall during the summer months. Also, in addition to the Manoa Falls Trail, many tourists visit the other trails in the Honolulu Mauka Trail System. Students at University of Hawaii also visit the trail for research and educational purposes.

=== Risks ===
There are signs throughout the trail that warn visitors of risk of bacteria in the water, and possible landslides. The Hawaiian State Department of Health discourages swimming and wading in the small pools surrounding the trail and waterfall. This is because of a bacterial disease called Leptospirosis, which is common in tropical climates such as Hawaii and is found in freshwater. The disease can be passed down from animals to humans, and rats and mice are the most common sources in Hawaii. The disease can cause mild to moderate flu-like symptoms that can last for up to 1 to 2 weeks.

=== Lyon Arboretum ===
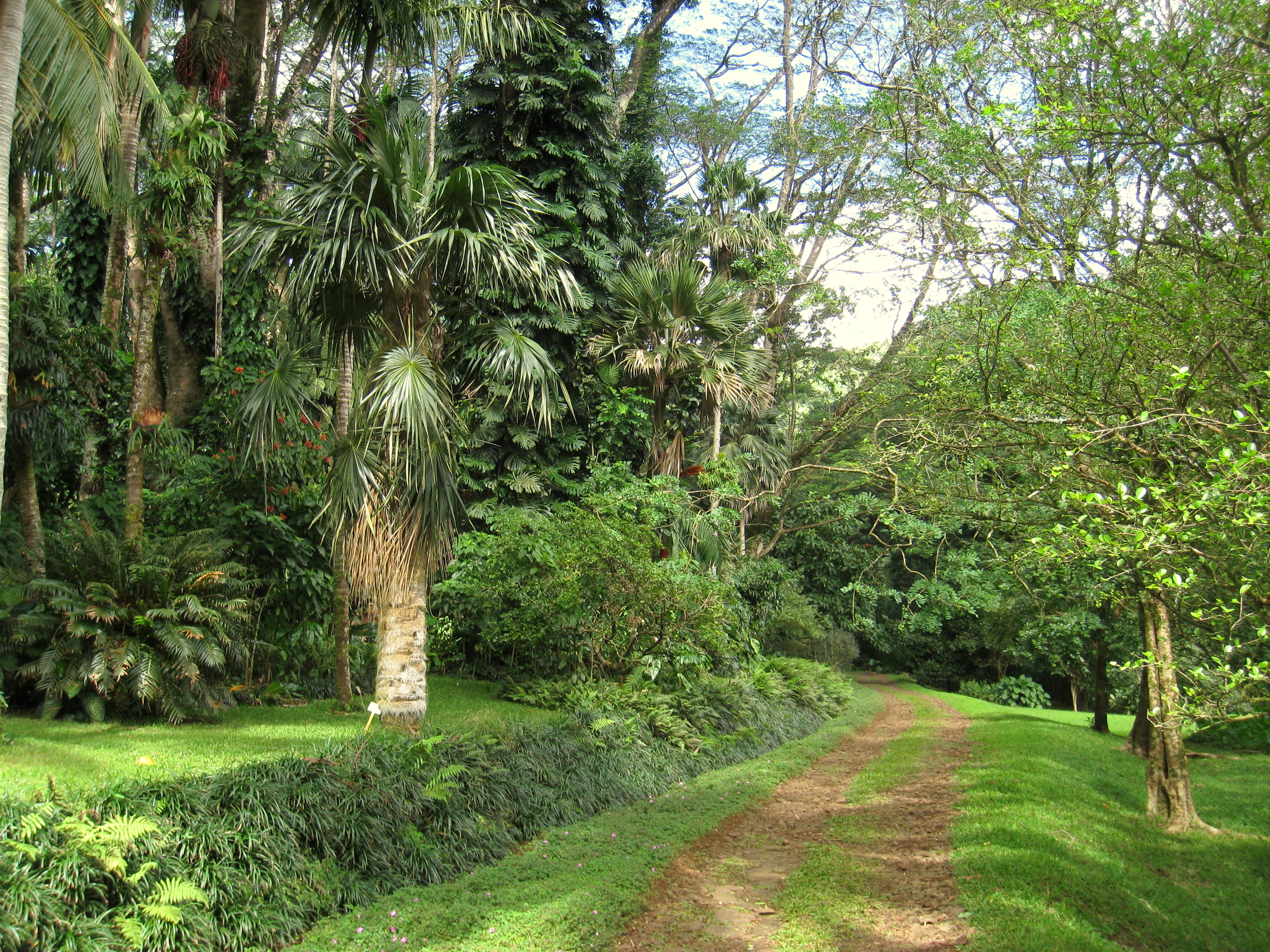
Lyon Arboretum in Oahu, Hawaii

Located in the Manoa Valley section of the Manoa Falls Trail, the Lyon Arboretum contains over 5000 plant species. Some of the plant species include, heliconias, gingers, aroids, bromeliads, and other native Hawaiian plants. The arboretum works to preserve and restore Hawaii's tropical forests, and many endangered plant species. It also functions as both research and academic resources by providing different programs that develop innovations to restore endangered native Hawaiian plants.

=== Rainbows End Snack Shop ===
Near entrance to Manoa Falls Trail is a snack shop called Rainbow's End. Hikers pay for vehicle parking ($7 per vehicle, $4 for Hawaii residents with I.D.), pick up forgotten equipment, or food.
