= Mānoa Falls =

Waterfall in Hawaii, United States

Coordinates: 21.3422°N 157.7992°W

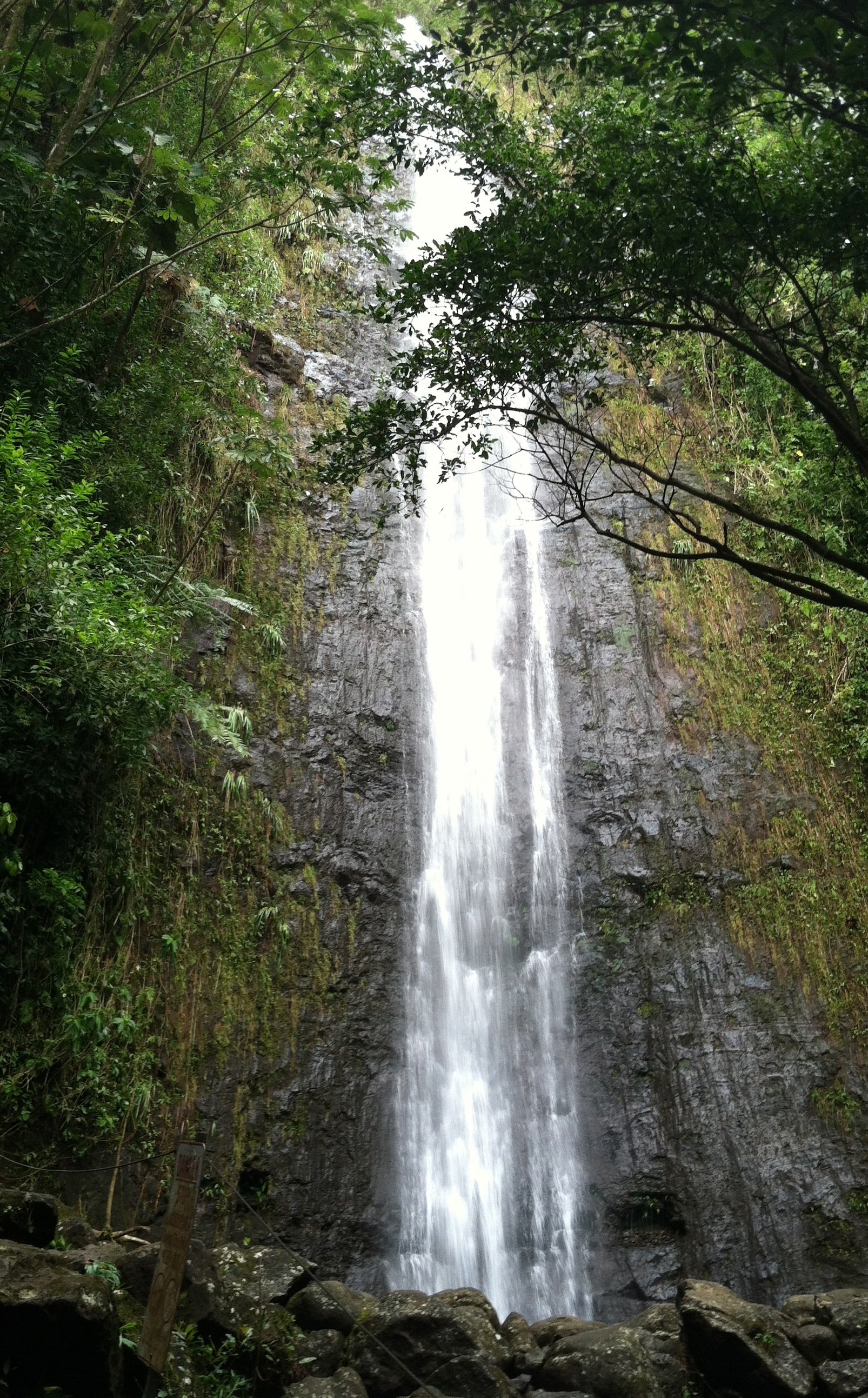
Mānoa Falls (2012)

Mānoa Falls is a 150-foot (46 m) waterfall along the Manoa Falls Trail in Honolulu, Hawaii. Swimming in the pool below the waterfall is highly discouraged because there is a threat of becoming infected with Leptospirosis, a disease causing mild to moderate flulike symptoms that can last for 1 to 2 weeks. Many tourists are attracted to the waterfall and the scenery throughout the trail leading to it. Another attraction near Mānoa Falls is the Lyon Arboretum, which preserves many endangered Hawaiian plant species. The hike to the waterfall and back takes about one hour. The waterfall and surrounding area experience rainfall almost every day, and flash floods can occur.

== Characteristics ==
Mānoa Falls is located on the island of Oahu in Honolulu, Hawaii, in Manoa Valley, and comprise a 150-foot (46 m) waterfall that empties into a small pool of water. The waterfall is nestled in the mountains of Koolau in a tropical rainforest. Since the area surrounding the waterfall is considered a tropical rainforest, it is prone to heavy rainfall often making the ground damp and muddy The high amount of precipitation leads to a high amount of plant life near the falls. There is often less water in the waterfall during the summer months, which leaves peak tourism extending from summer to fall, before the rainy months of November–March.

== Dangers ==
=== Leptospirosis ===
Swimming in the pool at the bottom of the falls is discouraged. This is due both to occasional rockfalls and to the bacterial disease leptospirosis, which causes severe flu-like symptoms. Leptospirosis is found in freshwater and is common in tropical climates. In Hawaii, rats and mice often carry the disease and can easily transfer it to humans through their urine.

=== Deaths ===
A 19 year old valedictorian from Kaiser High School, in Honolulu, Hawaii, died from falling from the top of Mānoa Falls on June 15, 2016. Kristi Takanishi died two days after the incident and the cause of death was determined to be from blunt force trauma to the head.

A 27 year old man died from falling from the top of Mānoa Falls on December 17, 2018. The man's name has yet to be released.

Phillip Scott Mann fell from the top of the falls and died on April 11, 2012. His body was not found until around 2p.m. the following day April 12th. Cause of death was blunt force trauma from the almost 150-foot (46 m) fall. Phillip was from Scottsmoor, Florida, and moved to Hawaii in 2011.

== Ecology ==
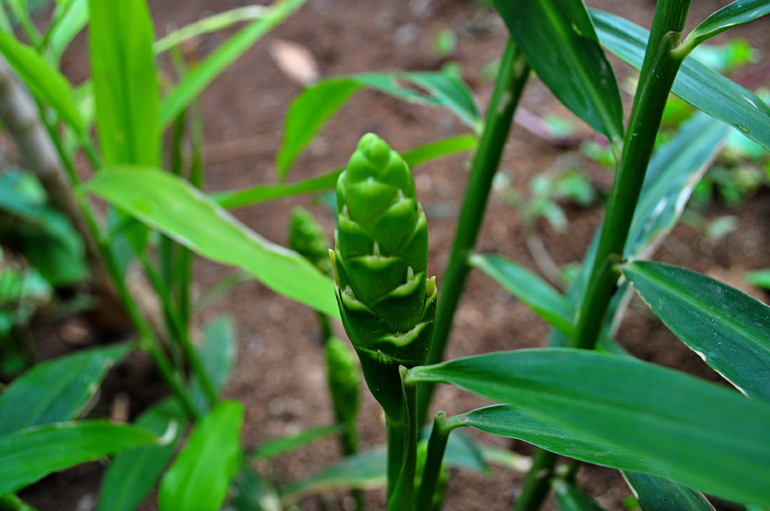
Ginger Plant found in the Lyon Arboretum

The Lyon Arboretum is located at the entrance to the Mānoa Falls Trail in Mānoa Valley. It contains over 5000 plant species. Some plant species included are heliconias, gingers, aroids, bromeliads, and some native Hawaiian plants. Many tourists visit the arboretum but some also go for research and academic purposes. It provides several different programs that develop innovations to restore endangered native Hawaiian plants.

== See also ==
- List of waterfalls
- List of Hawaii waterfalls
