= 2021–22 BYU Cougars women's basketball team =

Intercollegiate basketball season

2021–22 BYU Cougars women's basketball

WCC regular season champions St. Pete Showcase Champions

NCAA Tournament, First Round
- Conference: West Coast Conference

Ranking
- Coaches: No. 14
- AP: No. 20
- Record: 26–4 (15–1 WCC)
- Head coach: Jeff Judkins (21st season)
- Assistant coaches: Ray Stewart (11th season); Melanie Day (3rd season); Lee Cummard (3rd season)
- Home arena: Marriott Center

2021–22 West Coast Conference women's basketball standings
| | Conf. | | | | Overall |
| Team | W | | L | PCT | W | | L | PCT |
|---|---|---|---|---|---|---|---|---|
| No. 20 BYU | 15 | – | 1 | .938 | 26 | – | 4 | .867 |
| Gonzaga † | 15 | – | 2 | .882 | 27 | – | 7 | .794 |
| San Francisco | 10 | – | 8 | .556 | 17 | – | 16 | .515 |
| Portland | 8 | – | 7 | .533 | 20 | – | 11 | .645 |
| Saint Mary's | 9 | – | 9 | .500 | 18 | – | 15 | .545 |
| San Diego | 8 | – | 9 | .471 | 17 | – | 15 | .531 |
| Santa Clara | 8 | – | 10 | .444 | 16 | – | 15 | .516 |
| Pepperdine | 4 | – | 11 | .267 | 8 | – | 17 | .320 |
| Loyola Marymount | 4 | – | 13 | .235 | 11 | – | 19 | .367 |
| Pacific | 3 | – | 14 | .176 | 6 | – | 23 | .207 |
† 2022 WCC tournament winner Rankings from AP poll

The 2021–22 BYU Cougars women's basketball team represented Brigham Young University during the 2021–22 NCAA Division I women's basketball season. It was head coach Jeff Judkins's twenty first and final season at BYU. The Cougars, members of the West Coast Conference, played their home games at the Marriott Center.

== Before the season ==
=== Departures ===
Due to COVID-19 disruptions throughout college sports, the NCAA ruled that the 2020–21 season would not count against the eligibility of any women's basketball player. This meant that all seniors in 2020–21 had the option to return in 2021–22.

| Name | Number | Pos. | Height | Year | Hometown | Notes |
|---|---|---|---|---|---|---|
| Megan Stevenson | 1 | F | 6'0 | Freshman | Purcellville, Virginia | |
| Malli Perri | 15 | F | 6'5" | RS Junior | Pleasant Grove, Utah | Graduated and chose not to return |
| Tahlia White | 21 | F | 6'0 | Freshman | Orem, Utah | Transferred to Utah Valley |

=== Newcomers ===
| Name | Number | Pos. | Height | Year | Hometown | Notes |
|---|---|---|---|---|---|---|
| Amanda Barcello | 1 | F | 5'11 | Freshman | Chandler, Arizona | |
| Rose Bubakar | 24 | F | 6'0 | Freshman | Frederick, Maryland | |
| Emma Calvert | 25 | F | 6'4 | Freshman | Farr West, Utah | |
| Amber Kartchner | 33 | G | 5'9" | Freshman | Logan, Utah | |
| Arielle Mackey-Williams | 4 | G | 5'9" | Freshman | Logan, Utah | |

== 2021–22 media ==
=== BYU Sports Media ===
All Cougars home games are being shown on BYUtv or the BYUtv App. Conference road games are being shown on WCC Network. All remaining non-conference road games are also being streamed. Streaming partners for those games can be found on the schedule.

== Roster ==
2021–22 BYU Cougars women's basketball team
Players
Coaches

| Pos. | # | Name | Height | Year | Previous school | Hometown |
|---|---|---|---|---|---|---|
| G | 1 | Amanda Barcello | 5 ft 11 in (1.8 m) | Fr | Seton Catholic | Chandler, AZ |
| G | 2 | Shaylee Gonzales | 5 ft 10 in (1.78 m) | RS So | Mesquite | Gilbert, AZ |
| G | 3 | Nani Falatea | 5 ft 9 in (1.75 m) | Fr | East | Salt Lake City, UT |
| G | 4 | Arielle Mackey-Williams | 5 ft 9 in (1.75 m) | Fr | Tai Wananga Ki Ruakura | Ngati Porou, New Zealand |
| G | 5 | Maria Albiero | 5 ft 8 in (1.73 m) | Sr | Neusa Christian | Londrina, Brazil |
| G | 10 | Tegan Graham | 6 ft 0 in (1.83 m) | | Wellington Girls; Colgate | Wellington, New Zealand |
| F | 11 | Kaylee Smiler | 5 ft 8 in (1.73 m) | RS So | Melville | Hamilton, New Zealand |
| F | 12 | Lauren Gustin | 5 ft 8 in (1.73 m) | RS So | Salem Hills; Salt Lake CC; Idaho | Salem, UT |
| G | 13 | Paisley Harding | 5 ft 9 in (1.75 m) | Sr | Glacier Peak | Everett, WA |
| G | 20 | Devry Millett | 5 ft 10 in (1.78 m) | Fr | Folsom | Folsom, CA |
| F | 21 | Heather Hamson | 6 ft 3 in (1.91 m) | Fr | Pleasant Grove | Lindon, UT |
| C | 22 | Sara Hamson | 6 ft 7 in (2.01 m) | Sr | Pleasant Grove | Lindon, UT |
| F | 24 | Rose Bubakar | 6 ft 0 in (1.83 m) | Fr | Frederick | Frederick, MD |
| F | 25 | Emma Calvert | 6 ft 4 in (1.93 m) | Fr | Fremont | Farr West, UT |
| G | 30 | Kate Vorwaller | 5 ft 9 in (1.75 m) | Fr | Skyline | Salt Lake City, UT |
| F | 32 | Signe Glantz | 6 ft 1 in (1.85 m) | Jr | Lulea Gymnasie Skola | Östersund, Sweden |
| G | 33 | Amber Kartchner | 5 ft 9 in (1.75 m) | Fr | Logan | Logan, UT |
| F | 34 | Kyra Beckman | 6 ft 2 in (1.88 m) | RS Fr | Snohomish | Snohomish, WA |
| F | 42 | Kayla Belles-Lee | 6 ft 3 in (1.91 m) | Jr | Ithaca; Michigan State | Ithaca, MI |

Head coach

- Jeff Judkins (Utah)

Assistant coach(es)

- Ray Stewart (Utah Valley)
- Melanie Day (BYU)
- Lee Cummard (BYU)
- Xojian Harry- Director of Operations (BYU)

Legend

- (C) Team captain
- (S) Suspended
- (I) Ineligible
- (W) Walk-on
- Injured
- Current redshirt

Roster

== Schedule ==
| Date time, TV | Rank^{#} | Opponent^{#} | Result | Record | Site city, state |
Exhibition
| 11/04/2021*; 2:00 pm, byutv.org | | Westminster | W 73–52 | – | Marriott Center; Provo, UT |
Non-conference regular season
| 11/09/2021*; 4:00 pm, byutv.org | | Lipscomb | W 81–58 | 1–0 | Marriott Center; Provo, UT |
| 11/13/2021*; 4:00 pm, byutv.org | | Fresno State | W 80–64 | 2–0 | Marriott Center; Provo, UT |
| 11/17/2021*; 11:00 am, BYUtv | | Arizona State | W 55–44 | 3–0 | Marriott Center; Provo, UT |
| 11/20/2021*; 2:00 pm, BYUtv | | Boise State | W 84–40 | 4–0 | Marriott Center; Provo, UT |
| 11/23/2021*; 12:00 pm, BYUtv | | Utah State | W 101–74 | 5–0 | Marriott Center; Provo, UT |
| 11/25/2021*; 5:00 pm, FloHoops | | vs. No. 17 Florida State; St. Pete Showcase | W 61–54 | 6–0 | McArthur Gymnasium; St. Petersburg, FL |
| 11/27/2021*; 11:00 am, FloHoops | | vs. No. 22 West Virginia; St. Pete Showcase Championship | W 58–57 | 7–0 | McArthur Gymnasium; St. Petersburg, FL |
| 12/04/2021*; 5:00 pm, P12 | No. 21 | at Utah; Deseret First Duel | W 85–80 | 8–0 | Huntsman Center; Salt Lake City, UT |
| 12/10/2021*; 5:00 pm, Sooner Sports TV | No. 16 | at Oklahoma | L 91–99 ^{OT} | 8–1 | Lloyd Noble Center; Norman, OK |
| 12/18/2021*; 12:00 pm, BYUtv | No. 20 | Washington State | W 71–53 | 9–1 | Marriott Center; Provo, UT |
| 12/21/2021*; 7:00 pm, ESPN+ | No. 19 | at Montana State | W 89–67 | 10–1 | Worthington Arena; Bozeman, MT |
WCC regular season
| 12/30/2021; 7:00 pm, BYUtv | No. 18 | San Diego | Postponed due to COVID-19 issues | | Marriott Center; Provo, UT |
| 01/01/2022; 2:00 pm, BYUtv | No. 18 | Portland | Canceled due to COVID-19 issues | | Marriott Center; Provo, UT |
| 01/06/2022; 7:00 pm, WCC Net | No. 18 | at San Francisco | W 76–64 | 11–1 (1–0) | The Sobrato Center; San Francisco, CA |
| 01/08/2022; 2:00 pm, BYUtv | No. 18 | Pacific | W 94–68 | 12–1 (2–0) | Marriott Center; Provo, UT |
| 01/13/2022; 7:00 pm, BYUtv | No. 18 | Saint Mary's | W 78–36 | 13–1 (3–0) | Marriott Center; Provo, UT |
| 01/15/2022; 3:00 pm, WCC Net | No. 18 | at Loyola Marymount | W 77–37 | 14–1 (4–0) | Gersten Pavilion; Los Angeles, CA |
| 01/20/2022; 8:00 pm, WCC Net | No. 17 | at Pepperdine | Canceled due to COVID-19 issues | | Firestone Fieldhouse; Malibu, CA |
| 01/22/2022; 2:00 pm, AT&T RM | No. 17 | at San Diego | W 74–63 | 15–1 (5–0) | Jenny Craig Pavilion; San Diego, CA |
| 01/24/2022; 5:00 pm, BYUtv | No. 16 | San Diego moved from Dec. 30 | W 70–48 | 16–1 (6–0) | Marriott Center; Provo, UT |
| 01/27/2022; 11:00 am, byutv.org | No. 16 | Santa Clara | W 76–44 | 17–1 (7–0) | Marriott Center; Provo, UT |
| 01/29/2022; 2:00 pm, BYUtv | No. 16 | San Francisco | W 99–58 | 18–1 (8–0) | Marriott Center; Provo, UT |
| 02/03/2022; 6:00 pm, AT&T RM | No. 16 | at Portland | L 64–75 | 18–2 (8–1) | Chiles Center; Portland, OR |
| 02/05/2022; 3:00 pm, AT&T RM | No. 16 | at Gonzaga | W 62–50 | 19–2 (9–1) | McCarthey Athletic Center; Spokane, WA |
| 02/10/2022; 7:00 pm, BYUtv | No. 20 | Pepperdine | W 104–53 | 20–2 (10–1) | Marriott Center; Provo, UT |
| 02/12/2022; 2:00 pm, WCC Net | No. 20 | at Saint Mary's | W 84–69 | 21–2 (11–1) | University Credit Union Pavilion; Moraga, CA |
| 02/17/2022; 11:00 am, BYUtv | No. 20 | Loyola Marymount | W 77–54 | 22–2 (12–1) | Marriott Center; Provo, UT |
| 02/19/2022; 2:00 pm, BYUtv | No. 20 | Gonzaga | W 63–39 | 23–2 (13–1) | Marriott Center; Provo, UT |
| 02/24/2022; 7:00 pm, SCSP | No. 19 | at Santa Clara | W 103–66 | 24–2 (14–1) | Leavey Center; Santa Clara, CA |
| 02/26/2022; 3:00 pm, WCC Net | No. 19 | at Pacific | W 82–52 | 25–2 (15–1) | Alex G. Spanos Center; Stockton, CA |
WCC Tournament
| 03/07/2022; 1:00 pm, BYUtv | (1) No. 15 | vs. (4) Portland; WCC Semifinal | W 59–52 | 26–2 | Orleans Arena; Paradise, NV |
| 03/08/2022; 2:00 pm, ESPNU | (1) No. 15 | vs. (2) Gonzaga; WCC Championship | L 59–71 | 26–3 | Orleans Arena; Paradise, NV |
NCAA tournament
| 03/19/2022; 11:00 am, ESPNews | (6 W) No. 20 | vs. (11 W) Villanova; NCAA 1st Round | L 57–61 | 26–4 | Crisler Center; Ann Arbor, MI |
*Non-conference game. ^{#}Rankings from AP Poll. (#) Tournament seedings in parentheses. All times are in Mountain.

== Game summaries ==
=== Exhibition: Westminster ===
Broadcasters: Spencer Linton, Kristen Kozlowski, and Jason Shepherd

Starting Lineups:

- Westminster: Abby Mangum, Rae Falatea, Sarah McGinley, Ashley Greenwood, Hunter Krebs
- BYU: Shaylee Gonzales, Maria Albiero, Tegan Graham, Lauren Gustin, Paisley Harding

byutv.org

Nov. 4
2 p.m. MST

Recap

Westminster Griffins 52, BYU Cougars 73
Scoring by quarter: 14–19, 14–26, 16–12, 8–17
| Pts: Ashley Greenwood 17; Rebs: Ashley Greenwood 9 Asts: Abby Mangum, Sarah McGinley 3 | Pts: Paisley Harding 15; Rebs: Lauren Gustin 18; Asts: Shaylee Gonzales 6 |

Marriott Center
Provo, UT
Attendance: 531
Referees: Brenda Pantoja, Sha'Rae Mitchell, Erica Parker

=== Lipscomb ===
Broadcasters: Spencer Linton, Kristen Kozlowski, and Jason Shepherd

Series History: First Meeting
Starting Lineups:

- Lipscomb: Jordan Peete, Blythe Pearson, Bella Vinson, Jalyn Holcomb, Casey Collier
- BYU: Shaylee Gonzales, Maria Albiero, Tegan Graham, Lauren Gustin, Paisley Harding

byutv.org

Nov. 9
4 p.m. MST

Recap

Lipscomb Bison 58, BYU Cougars 91
Scoring by quarter: 13–22, 14–19, 22–32, 9–8
| Pts: Blythe Pearson 19; Rebs: Blythe Pearson, Maddie Cook 5 Asts: Casey Collier 6 | Pts: Tegan Graham 18; Rebs: Lauren Gustin 13; Asts: Tegan Graham 6 |

Marriott Center
Provo, UT
Attendance: 468
Referees: Lisa Jones, Steve Belnap, Devaughn Brazier

=== Fresno State ===
Broadcasters: Dave McCann and Kristen Kozlowski

Series History: BYU leads 8–6
Starting Lineups:

- Fresno State: Hanna Cavinder, Haley Cavinder, Amiee Book, Yanina Todorova, Maria Guimaraes
- BYU: Shaylee Gonzales, Maria Albiero, Tegan Graham, Lauren Gustin, Paisley Harding

byutv.org

Nov. 13
4 p.m. MST

Recap

Fresno State Bulldogs 64, BYU Cougars 80
Scoring by quarter: 16–19, 13–18, 15–24, 20–19
| Pts: Hanna Cavinder 14; Rebs: Haley Cavinder 8 Asts: Haley Cavinder 10 | Pts: Shaylee Gonzales, Paisley Harding 22; Rebs: Lauren Gustin 13; Asts: Maria Albiero, Tegan Graham 8 |

Marriott Center
Provo, UT
Attendance: 1,152
Referees: Infini Robinson, Shelley Nakasone, Kelly Broomfield

=== Arizona State ===
Broadcasters: Spencer Linton, Kristen Kozlowski, and Jason Shepherd

Series History: BYU leads 6–4
Starting Lineups:

- Arizona State: Taya Hanson, Jaddan Simmons, Mael Gilles, Maggie Besselink, Jade Loville
- BYU: Shaylee Gonzales, Maria Albiero, Tegan Graham, Lauren Gustin, Paisley Harding

BYUtv

Nov. 17
11 a.m. MST

Recap

Arizona State Sun Devils 44, BYU Cougars 55
Scoring by quarter: 10–14, 10–15, 8–16, 16–10
| Pts: Taya Hanson, Jaddan Simmons, Mael Gilles 8 Rebs: Maggie Besselink 7 Asts: Mael Gilles, Gabriela Bosquez, Sydney Erikstrup 2 | Pts: Paisley Harding 22; Rebs: Lauren Gustin 16; Asts: Maria Albiero 3 |

Marriott Center
Provo, UT
Attendance: 3,700
Referees: Michol Murray, Cheryl Flores, Kimberly Hobbs

=== Boise State ===
Broadcasters: Jarom Jordan and Kristen Kozlowski

Series History: BYU leads 11–8
Starting Lineups:

- Boise State: Mary Kay Naro, Anna Ostlie, Dominique Leonidas, Elodie Lalotte, Abby Muse
- BYU: Shaylee Gonzales, Maria Albiero, Tegan Graham, Lauren Gustin, Paisley Harding

BYUtv

Nov. 20
2 p.m. MST

Recap

Boise State Broncos 40, BYU Cougars 84
Scoring by quarter: 13–22, 10–11, 8–28, 9–23
| Pts: Elodie Lalotte 9 Rebs: Mary Kay Naro 8 Asts: Dominique Leonidas 3 | Pts: Shaylee Gonzales, Nani Falatea 14; Rebs: Lauren Gustin 12; Asts: Maria Albiero 5 |

Marriott Center
Provo, UT
Attendance: 1,278
Referees: Darren Kreznik, Benny Luna, Nicole Leon

=== Utah State ===
Broadcasters: Spencer Linton, Kristen Kozlowski and Jason Shepherd

Series History: BYU leads 38–4
Starting Lineups:

- Utah State: Laci Hawthorne, E'Lease Stafford, Manna Mensah, Olivia Wikstrom, Kaylin Randhawa
- BYU: Shaylee Gonzales, Maria Albiero, Tegan Graham, Lauren Gustin, Paisley Harding

BYUtv

Nov. 23
12 p.m. MST

Recap

Utah State Aggies 74, BYU Cougars 101
Scoring by quarter: 11–26, 20–20, 17–23, 26–22
| Pts: Emmie Harris 17; Rebs: Meagan Mendazona 4 Asts: Emmie Harris 6 | Pts: Shaylee Gonzales 24; Rebs: Shaylee Gonzales 7 Asts: Teagan Graham 7 |

Marriott Center
Provo, UT
Attendance: 756
Referees: Anita Ortega, Kaili Kimura, Brad Schmidt

=== Florida State ===
Broadcasters: Tom James and Brigid Merenda

Series History: Series even 1–1
Starting Lineups:

- Florida State: River Baldwin, Sammie Puisis, Sara Bejedi, Morgan Jones, Valencia Myers
- BYU: Shaylee Gonzales, Maria Albiero, Tegan Graham, Lauren Gustin, Paisley Harding

FloHoops

Nov. 25
7 p.m. EST

Recap

#17/22 Florida State Seminoles 54, BYU Cougars 61
Scoring by quarter: 16–17, 12–15, 10–13, 16–16
| Pts: Sammie Puisis 16; Rebs: Morgan Jones 10; Asts: Sara Bejedi, O'Mariah Gordon 3 | Pts: Shaylee Gonzales 24; Rebs: Lauren Gustin 11; Asts: Tegan Graham 4 |

McArthur Gymnasium
St. Petersburg, FL
Attendance: 340
Referees: Kylie Galloway, Troy Wilders, Ashlee Goone

=== West Virginia ===
Broadcasters: Tom James and Brigid Merenda

Series History: First Meeting
Starting Lineups:

- BYU: Shaylee Gonzales, Maria Albiero, Tegan Graham, Lauren Gustin, Paisley Harding
- West Virginia: Jayla Hemingway, Kirsten Deans, Esmery Martinez, Kari Niblack, Madisen Smith

FloHoops

Nov. 27
1 p.m. EST

Recap

BYU Cougars 58, #22/23 West Virginia Mountaineers 57
Scoring by quarter: 11–21, 18–16, 16–7, 13–13
| Pts: Shaylee Gonzales 20; Rebs: Lauren Gustin 8 Asts: Maria Albiero 5 | Pts: Esmery Martinez 18; Rebs: Blessing Ejiofor 7 Asts: Jayla Hemingway, Kirsten Deans 3 |

McArthur Gymnasium
St. Petersburg, FL
Attendance: 387
Referees: Not listed

=== Utah ===
Broadcasters: Krista Blunk and Mary Murphy

Series History: Utah leads 67–41
Starting Lineups:

- BYU: Shaylee Gonzales, Maria Albiero, Tegan Graham, Lauren Gustin, Paisley Harding
- Utah: Dru Glyten, Brynna Maxwell, Jenna Johnson, Kennady McQueen, Dasia Young

P12

Dec. 4
5 p.m. MST

Recap

#21/23 BYU Cougars 85, Utah Utes 80
Scoring by quarter: 24–17, 20–16, 23–18, 18–29
| Pts: Gianna Kneepkens 29; Rebs: Kennady McQueen 6 Asts: Dru Glyten 8 | Pts: Paisley Harding 33; Rebs: Tegan Graham 6 Asts: Tegan Graham 8 |

Huntsman Center
Salt Lake City, UT
Attendance: 3,218
Referees: Brenda Pantoja, Benny Luna, Felecity Willis

=== Oklahoma ===
Broadcasters: Chad McKee and Dan Hughes

Series History: Oklahoma leads 5–1
Starting Lineups:

- BYU: Shaylee Gonzales, Maria Albiero, Tegan Graham, Lauren Gustin, Paisley Harding
- Oklahoma: Kelbie Washington, Nydia Lampkin, Ana Llanusa, Madi Williams, Taylor Robertson

Sooner Sports TV

Dec. 10
6 p.m. CST

Recap

#16/17 BYU Cougars 91, Oklahoma Sooners 99 (OT)
Scoring by quarter: 26–19, 15–18, 15–21, 27–25, Overtime: 8–16
| Pts: Tegan Graham 30; Rebs: Lauren Gustin 21; Asts: Maria Albiero 6 | Pts: Madi Williams 25; Rebs: Madi Williams 14; Asts: Madi Williams, Taylor Robertson 4 |

Lloyd Noble Center
Norman, OK
Attendance: 1,527
Referees: Mark Zentz, Julie Krommenhoek, Demoya Williams

=== Washington State ===
Broadcasters: Jarom Jordan, Kristen Kozlowski and Kiki Solano

Series History: Washington State leads 6–5
Starting Lineups:

- Washington State: Krystal Leger-Walker, Charlisse Leger-Walker, Ula Motuga, Johanna Teder, Bella Murekatete
- BYU: Shaylee Gonzales, Maria Albiero, Tegan Graham, Lauren Gustin, Paisley Harding

BYUtv

Dec. 18
12 p.m. MST

Recap

Washington State Cougars 53, #20/22 BYU Cougars 71
Scoring by quarter: 13–21, 16–16, 11–10, 13–24
| Pts: Paisley Harding 20; Rebs: Lauren Gustin 9 Asts: Maria Albiero 6 | Pts: Charlisse Leger-Walker 21; Rebs: Ula Motuga 10; Asts: Krystal Leger-Walker, Charlisse Leger-Walker 4 |

Marriott Center
Provo, UT
Attendance: 1,483
Referees: N/A

=== Montana State ===
Broadcasters: Mark Martello

Series History: BYU leads 8–3
Starting Lineups:

- BYU: Shaylee Gonzales, Maria Albiero, Tegan Graham, Lauren Gustin, Paisley Harding
- Montana State: Darian White, Kola Bad Bear, Katelynn Limardo, Leia Beattie, Gabby Mocchi

ESPN+

Dec. 21
7 p.m. MST

Recap

#19/22 BYU Cougars 89, Montana State Bobcats 67
Scoring by quarter: 22–16, 24–16, 24–15, 19–20
| Pts: Shaylee Gonzales 21; Rebs: Lauren Gustin 18; Asts: Shaylee Gonzales 5 | Pts: Darian White 13; Rebs: Darian White 10; Asts: Darian White, Leia Beattie, Ashley Van Sickle 3 |

Worthington Arena
Bozeman, MT
Attendance: 1,362
Referees: Michael Price, Kelly Broomfield, Ashley Ellis

=== San Francisco ===
Broadcasters: George Devine

Series History: BYU leads 22–7
Starting Lineups:

- BYU: Shaylee Gonzales, Maria Albiero, Tegan Graham, Lauren Gustin, Paisley Harding
- San Francisco: Kia Vaalavirta, Marianna Klavina, Amalie Langer, Jessica McDowell-White, Claudia Langarita

WCC Net

Jan. 6
6 p.m. PST

Recap

#18/18 BYU Cougars 76, San Francisco Dons 64
Scoring by quarter: 16–12, 23–10, 22–19, 15–23
| Pts: Paisley Harding 19; Rebs: Lauren Gustin 14; Asts: Tegan Graham 6 | Pts: Jasmine Gayles 22; Rebs: Kennedy Dickie 8 Asts: Jessica McDowell-White 10 |

The Sobrato Center
San Francisco, CA
Attendance: 171
Referees: Michael Price, Ashley Ellis, Teresa Turner

=== Pacific ===
Broadcasters: Dave McCann, Kristen Kozlowski, and Jason Shepherd

Series History: BYU leads 17–4
Starting Lineups:

- Pacific: Anaya James, Cecilia Holmberg, Elizabeth Elliott, Erica Adams, Sam Ashby
- BYU: Shaylee Gonzales, Maria Albiero, Tegan Graham, Lauren Gustin, Paisley Harding

BYUtv

Jan. 8
2 p.m. MST

Recap

Pacific Tigers 68, #18/18 BYU Cougars 94
Scoring by quarter: 10–30, 22–25, 19–23, 17–16
| Pts: Anaya James 18; Rebs: Elizabeth Elliott 11; Asts: Liz Smith 4 | Pts: Shaylee Gonzales 22; Rebs: Lauren Gustin 13; Asts: Shaylee Gonzales 7 |

Marriott Center
Provo, UT
Attendance: 1,425
Referees: Anita Ortega, Sha'Rae Mitchell, Esther Hsu

=== Saint Mary's ===
Broadcasters: Spencer Linton, Kristen Kozlowski, and Kiki Solano

Series History: BYU leads 13–10
Starting Lineups:

- Saint Mary's: Taycee Wedin, Madeline Holland, Tayla Dalton, Hannah Rapp, Ali Bamberger
- BYU: Shaylee Gonzales, Maria Albiero, Tegan Graham, Lauren Gustin, Paisley Harding

BYUtv

Jan. 13
7 p.m. MST

Recap

Saint Mary's Gaels 36, #18/17 BYU Cougars 78
Scoring by quarter: 5–24, 5–17, 19–23, 7–15
| Pts: Ali Bamberger 14; Rebs: Aspen Garrison 8 Asts: Hannah Rapp 3 | Pts: Paisley Harding 18; Rebs: Lauren Gustin 12; Asts: Tegan Geaham 7 |

Marriott Center
Provo, UT
Attendance: 1,243
Referees: Brenda Pantoja, Stacie Blow, Cheryll Blue

=== Loyola Marymount ===
Broadcasters: Brendan Craig and Gary Craig

Series History: BYU leads 19–2
Starting Lineups:

- BYU: Shaylee Gonzales, Maria Albiero, Tegan Graham, Lauren Gustin, Paisley Harding
- Loyola Marymount: Aspyn Adams, Kimora Sykes, Nicole Rodriguez, Ariel Johnson, Alexis Mark

WCC Net

Jan. 15
2 p.m. PST

Recap

#18/17 BYU Cougars 77, Loyola Marymount Lions 37
Scoring by quarter: 26–12, 18–9, 20–7, 13–9
| Pts: Shaylee Gonzales 19; Rebs: Lauren Gustin 7 Asts: Shaylee Gonzales, Tegan Graham 5 | Pts: Aspyn Adams, Alexis Mark, Khari Clark 6 Rebs: Khari Clark 5 Asts: Ariel Johnson 4 |

Gersten Pavilion
Los Angeles, CA
Attendance: 354
Referees: Michol Murray, Tyler Trimble, Erica Parker

=== San Diego ===
Broadcasters: Anne Marie Anderson and Mary Murphy

Series History: BYU leads 13–8
Starting Lineups:

- BYU: Shaylee Gonzales, Maria Albiero, Tegan Graham, Lauren Gustin, Paisley Harding
- San Diego: Steph Gorman, Erica Martinsen, Jordyn Edwards, Kendall Bird, Sydney Hunter

AT&T RM

Jan. 22
1:06 p.m. PST

Recap

#17/15 BYU Cougars 74, San Diego Toreros 63
Scoring by quarter: 15–11, 21–21, 21–10, 17–21
| Pts: Shaylee Gonzales 29; Rebs: Lauren Gustin 10; Asts: Tegan Graham 5 | Pts: Jordyn Edwards 13; Rebs: Sydney Hunter 9 Asts: Jordyn Edwards 5 |

Jenny Craig Pavilion
San Diego, CA
Attendance: 279
Referees: Charles Gonzalez, Melissa Barlow, Alecia Murray

=== San Diego ===
Broadcasters: Spencer Linton, Kristen Kozlowski, and Jason Shepherd

Series History: BYU leads 14–8
Starting Lineups:

- San Diego: Steph Gorman, Erica Martinsen, Jordyn Edwards, Kendall Bird, Sydney Hunter
- BYU: Shaylee Gonzales, Maria Albiero, Tegan Graham, Lauren Gustin, Paisley Harding

BYUtv

Jan. 24
5:05 p.m. MST

Recap

San Diego Toreros 48, #16/15 BYU Cougars 70
Scoring by quarter: 7–12, 12–23, 14–22, 15–13
| Pts: Harsimran Kaur 13; Rebs: Harsimran Kaur 6 Asts: Erica Martinsen, Gabby Giuffre 2 | Pts: Shaylee Gonzales 20; Rebs: Lauren Gustin 13; Asts: Shaylee Gonzales, Tegan Graham 5 |

Marriott Center
Provo, UT
Attendance: 870
Referees: Kyle Bacon, Ashley Ellis, Corey Long

=== Santa Clara ===
Broadcasters: Dave McCann and Kristen Kozlowski

Series History: BYU leads 22–2
Starting Lineups:

- Santa Clara: Merle Wiehl, Bryce Nixon, Lara Edmanson, Lindsey VanAllen, Lana Hollingsworth
- BYU: Shaylee Gonzales, Maria Albiero, Tegan Graham, Lauren Gustin, Paisley Harding

byutv.org

Jan. 22
7 p.m. MST

Recap

Santa Clara Broncos 44, #16/16 BYU Cougars 76
Scoring by quarter: 9–21, 10–24, 14–18, 11–13
| Pts: Lindsey VanAllen 10; Rebs: Danja Stafford 8 Asts: Lana Hollingsworth 4 | Pts: Tegham Graham 16; Rebs: Lauren Gustin 11; Asts: Shaylee Gonzales 9 |

Marriott Center
Provo, UT
Attendance: 981
Referees: Michol Murray, Felecity Willis, Lee Mullen

=== San Francisco ===
Broadcasters: Dave McCann, Kristen Kozlowski, and Jason Shepherd

Series History: BYU leads 23–7
Starting Lineups:

- San Francisco: Jasmine Gayles, Kennedy Dickie, Jessica McDowell-White, Claudia Langarita, Lucija Kostic
- BYU: Shaylee Gonzales, Maria Albiero, Tegan Graham, Lauren Gustin, Paisley Harding

BYUtv

Jan. 29
2 p.m. MST

Recap

San Francisco Dons 58, #16/16 BYU Cougars 99
Scoring by quarter: 13–28, 20–24, 14–23, 11–24
| Pts: Kennedy Dickie 17; Rebs: Kennedy Dickie 8 Asts: Jessica McDowell-White 3 | Pts: Paisley Harding 30; Rebs: Lauren Gustin 14; Asts: Mario Albiero 9 |

Marriott Center
Provo, UT
Attendance: 1,648
Referees: Julie Krommenhoek, Sha'Rae Mitchell, Alecia Murray

=== Portland ===
Broadcasters: Ann Schatz and Jennifer Mountain

Series History: BYU leads 26–5
Starting Lineups:

- BYU: Shaylee Gonzales, Maria Albiero, Tegan Graham, Lauren Gustin, Paisley Harding
- Portland: Keeley Frawley, Haylee Andrews, Alex Fowler, Maddie Muhlheim, Lucy Cochrane

AT&T RM

Feb. 3
5 p.m. PST

Recap

#16/16 BYU Cougars 64, Portland Pilots 75
Scoring by quarter: 18–18, 9–21, 15–14, 22–22
| Pts: Shaylee Gonzales 16; Rebs: Lauren Gustin 8 Asts: Tegan Graham 4 | Pts: Alex Fowler 23; Rebs: Alex Fowler 7 Asts: Lucy Cochrane 5 |

Chiles Center
Portland, OR
Attendance: 533
Referees: Cathi Cornell, Teresa Turner, Kenneth Nash

=== Gonzaga ===
Broadcasters: Ann Schatz and Jennifer Mountain

Series History: Gonzaga leads 18–14
Starting Lineups:

- BYU: Shaylee Gonzales, Maria Albiero, Tegan Graham, Lauren Gustin, Paisley Harding
- Gonzaga: Anamaria Virjoghe, Abby O'Connor, Kayleigh Truong, Cierra Walker, Melody Kempton

AT&T RM

Feb. 5
2 p.m. PST

Recap

#16/16 BYU Cougars 62, Gonzaga Bulldogs 50
Scoring by quarter: 10–20, 10–15, 19–3, 23–12
| Pts: Paisley Harding 22; Rebs: Lauren Gustin 10; Asts: Shaylee Gonzales 7 | Pts: Melody Kempton 10; Rebs: Melody Kempton 7 Asts: Kayleigh Truong 5 |

McCarthey Athletic Center
Spokane, WA
Attendance: 5,503
Referees: Robert Scofield, Kimberly Hobbs, Corey Long

=== Pepperdine ===
Broadcasters: Spencer Linton and Kristen Kozlowski

Series History: BYU leads 23–4
Starting Lineups:

- Pepperdine: Malia Bambrick, Meaali'i Amosa, Becky Obinma, Kendyl Carson, Ally Stedman
- BYU: Shaylee Gonzales, Maria Albiero, Tegan Graham, Lauren Gustin, Paisley Harding

BYUtv

Feb. 10
7 p.m. MST

Recap

Pepperdine Waves 53, #20/18 BYU Cougars 104
Scoring by quarter: 11–29, 22–23, 6–33, 14–19
| Pts: Ally Stedman 10; Rebs: Meaali'i Amosa 5 Asts: Jane Nwaba 3 | Pts: Paisley Harding 22; Rebs: Lauren Gustin 10; Asts: Shaylee Gonzales 13 |

Marriott Center
Provo, UT
Attendance: 1,635
Referees: Darren Krzesnik, Cheryll Blue, Sha'Rae Mitchell

=== Saint Mary's ===
Broadcasters: Ben Ross and Evan Giddings

Series History: BYU leads 14–10
Starting Lineups:

- BYU: Shaylee Gonzales, Maria Albiero, Tegan Graham, Lauren Gustin, Paisley Harding
- Saint Mary's: Taycee Wedin, Madeline Holland, Tayla Dalton, Jade Kirisome, Ali Bamberger

WCC Net

Feb. 12
1:06 p.m. PST

Recap

#20/18 BYU Cougars 84, Saint Mary's Gaels 69
Scoring by quarter: 16–23, 24–19, 24–19, 20–8
| Pts: Shaylee Gonzales 35; Rebs: Lauren Gustin 11; Asts: Shaylee Gonzales, Tegan Graham 6 | Pts: Ali Bamberger 17; Rebs: Ali Bamberger 9 Asts: Taycee Wedin, Madeline Holland, Tayla Dalton, Ali Bamberger 3 |

University Credit Union Pavilion
Moraga, CA
Attendance: 498
Referees: Lisa Jones, Brian Woods, Richard Waters

=== Loyola Marymount ===
Broadcasters: Spencer Linton, Kristen Kozlowski, and Jason Shepherd

Series History: BYU leads 20–2
Starting Lineups:

- Loyola Marymount: Cassandra Gordon, Jasmine Jones, Nicole Rodriguez, Ariel Johnson, Alexis Mark
- BYU: Shaylee Gonzales, Maria Albiero, Tegan Graham, Lauren Gustin, Paisley Harding

BYUtv

Feb. 17
11 a.m. MST

Recap

Loyola Marymount Lions 54, #20/16 BYU Cougars 77
Scoring by quarter: 12–15, 12–20, 14–21, 16–21
| Pts: Jasmine Jones, Ariel Johnson 12; Rebs: Jasmine Jones 8 Asts: Cassandra Gordon 4 | Pts: Shaylee Gonzales 19; Rebs: Lauren Gustin 12; Asts: Nani Falatea 4 |

Marriott Center
Provo, UT
Attendance: 1,924
Referees: Marc Merritt, Lee Mullen, Juchell Wardlow

=== Gonzaga ===
Broadcasters: Spencer Linton, Kristen Kozlowski, and Kiki Solano

Series History: Gonzaga leads 18–15
Starting Lineups:

- Gonzaga: Anamaria Virjoghe, Abby O'Connor, Kayleigh Truong, Cierra Walker, Melody Kempton
- BYU: Shaylee Gonzales, Maria Albiero, Tegan Graham, Lauren Gustin, Paisley Harding

BYUtv

Feb. 19
2 p.m. MST

Recap

Gonzaga Bulldogs 39, #20/16 BYU Cougars 63
Scoring by quarter: 12–11, 5–16, 8–23, 14–13
| Pts: Melody Kempton 11; Rebs: Abby O'Connor 6 Asts: Anamaria Virjoghe, Kaylynne Truong 4 | Pts: Shaylee Gonzales 21; Rebs: Lauren Gustin 13; Asts: Paisley Harding 7 |

Marriott Center
Provo, UT
Attendance: 6,289
Referees: Richard Waters, Sha'Rae Mitchell, Brian Woods

=== Santa Clara ===
Broadcasters: Joe Ritzo

Series History: BYU leads 22–2
Starting Lineups:

- BYU: Shaylee Gonzales, Maria Albiero, Tegan Graham, Lauren Gustin, Paisley Harding
- Santa Clara: Merle Wiehl, Lindsey VanAllen, Ashley Hiraki, Danja Stafford, Lana Hollingsworth

SCSP

Feb. 24
6 p.m. PST

Recap

#19/15 BYU Cougars 103, Santa Clara Broncos 66
Scoring by quarter: 24–19, 29–11, 28–18, 22–18
| Pts: Paisley Harding 28; Rebs: Shaylee Gonzales 9 Asts: Tegan Graham 8 | Pts: Lara Edmanson 20; Rebs: Danja Stafford 7 Asts: Ashley Hiraki 6 |

Leavey Center
Santa Clara, CA
Attendance: 402
Referees: Melissa Barlow, Ashley Ellis, Breana Fields

=== Pacific ===
Broadcasters: Don Gubbins

Series History: BYU leads 18–4
Starting Lineups:

- BYU: Shaylee Gonzales, Maria Albiero, Tegan Graham, Lauren Gustin, Paisley Harding
- Pacific: Anaya James, Cecilia Holmberg, Jordan Cruz, Elizabeth Elliott, Sam Ashby

WCC Net

Feb. 26
2 p.m. PST

Recap

#19/15 BYU Cougars 82, Pacific Tigers 52
Scoring by quarter: 23–9, 27–11, 21–12, 11–20
| Pts: Shaylee Gonzales 18; Rebs: Lauren Gustin 13; Asts: Tegan Graham 5 | Pts: Diamond Richardson 12; Rebs: Elizabeth Elliott 8 Asts: Josephine Millard, Anaya James, Diamond Richardson, Elizabeth Elliott, Madelene Ennis 1 |

Alex G. Spanos Center
Stockton, CA
Attendance: 591
Referees: Ashley Clark, Devaughn Brazier, Felecity Willis

=== WCC Semifinal: Portland ===
Broadcasters: Spencer Linton and Kristen Kozlowski

Series History: BYU leads 26–6
Starting Lineups:

- Portland: Rose Pflug, Emme Shearer, Alex Fowler, Maddie Muhlheim, Lucy Cochrane
- BYU: Shaylee Gonzales, Maria Albiero, Tegan Graham, Lauren Gustin, Paisley Harding

BYUtv

Mar. 7
12 p.m. PST

Recap

Portland Pilots 52, #15/14 BYU Cougars 59
Scoring by quarter: 15–13, 15–18, 10–9, 12–19
| Pts: Maisie Burnham 17; Rebs: Alex Fowler 11; Asts: Alex Fowler 6 | Pts: Shaylee Gonzales 20; Rebs: Tegan Graham 11; Asts: Tegan Graham 6 |

Orleans Arena
Paradise, NV
Referees: In'Fini Robinson, Brian Woods, Benny Luna

=== WCC Championship: Gonzaga ===
Broadcasters: Dave Flemming and Christy Thomaskutty

Series History: Gonzaga leads 18–16
Starting Lineups:

- Gonzaga: Anamaria Virjoghe, Abby O'Connor, Kayleigh Truong, Cierra Walker, Melody Kempton
- BYU: Shaylee Gonzales, Maria Albiero, Tegan Graham, Lauren Gustin, Paisley Harding

ESPNU

Mar. 8
1 p.m. PST

Recap

Gonzaga Bulldogs 71, #15/13 BYU Cougars 59
Scoring by quarter: 16–12, 13–9, 14–17, 28–21
| Pts: Melody Kempton 15; Rebs: Abby O'Connor 10; Asts: Kayleigh Truong 4 | Pts: Shaylee Gonzales 16; Rebs: Shaylee Gonzales 12; Asts: Tegan Graham 6 |

Orleans Arena
Paradise, NV
Referees: Brenda Pantoja, Michol Murray, Tiffany Bird

=== NCAA 1st Round: Villanova ===
Broadcasters: Sam Gore and Aja Ellison

Series History: Villanova leads 1–0
Starting Lineups:

- Villanova: Lucy Olsen, Lior Garzon, Brianna Herlihy, Brooke Mullin, Madison Siegrist
- BYU: Shaylee Gonzales, Maria Albiero, Tegan Graham, Lauren Gustin, Paisley Harding

ESPNews

Mar. 19
1 p.m. EDT

Recap

Villanova Wildcats 61, #20/15 BYU Cougars 57
Scoring by quarter: 14–17, 15–13, 15–11, 17–16
| Pts: Madison Siegrist 25; Rebs: Brianna Herlihy 9 Asts: Brianna Herlihy, Madison Siegrist, Bella Runyan 3 | Pts: Paisley Harding 21; Rebs: Lauren Gustin 13; Asts: Shaylee Gonzales 8 |

Crisler Center
Ann Arbor, MI
Referees: John Capolino, William Smith, Melissa Barlow

== Conference Honors ==
- Shaylee Gonzales, Lauren Gustin, and Paisley Harding were selected to the 2021–22 All-WCC Preseason Women's Basketball Team.
- Paisley Harding won the Week 2 WCC Player of the Week conference award.
- Shaylee Gonzales won the Week 3 WCC Player of the Week conference award. Additionally she won the St. Pete Showcase MVP title.
- Lee Cummard went 3–0 and won the St. Pete Showcase as interim coach after Jeff Judkins had to sit out due to a positive COVID-19 test.
- On February 10 Jeff Judkins recorded coaching career win 450 when BYU defeated Pepperdine.
- On Senior Day (February 19) the Cougars set an all-time record high attendance for a women's basketball game at the Marriott Center when 6,289 fans attended the game against the Zags.

== Rankings ==
2021–22 NCAA Division I women's basketball rankings

Regular season polls
| Poll | Pre- Season | Week 1 | Week 2 | Week 3 | Week 4 | Week 5 | Week 6 | Week 7 | Week 8 | Week 9 | Week 10 | Week 11 | Week 12 | Week 13 | Week 14 | Week 15 | Week 16 | Week 17 | Week 18 | Final |
|---|---|---|---|---|---|---|---|---|---|---|---|---|---|---|---|---|---|---|---|---|
| AP | (NR) | (RV) | (RV) | 21 | 16 | 21 | 19 | 18 | 18 | 18 | 17 | 16 | 16 | 20 | 20 | 19 | 17 | 15 | 20 | |
| Coaches | (NR) | (NR)^ | (RV) | 23 | 17 | 22 | 22 | 19 | 18 | 17 | 15 | 16 | 16 | 18 | 16 | 15 | 14 | 13 | 14 | |

Legend
| | Increase in ranking |
| | Decrease in ranking |
| | No change |
| (RV) | Received votes |
| (NR) | Not ranked |

^The Coaches poll did not release a week 1 ranking.
