= 2022 West Coast Conference women's basketball tournament =

- Classification: Division I
- Season: 2021–22
- Teams: 10
- Finals site: Orleans Arena; Paradise, Nevada
- Champions: Gonzaga (10th title)
- Winning coach: Lisa Fortier (4th title)
- MVP: Melody Kempton (Gonzaga)
- Television: ESPNU/BYUtv

2021–22 West Coast Conference women's basketball standings
| | Conf. | | | | Overall |
| Team | W | | L | PCT | W | | L | PCT |
|---|---|---|---|---|---|---|---|---|
| No. 20 BYU | 15 | – | 1 | .938 | 26 | – | 4 | .867 |
| Gonzaga † | 15 | – | 2 | .882 | 27 | – | 7 | .794 |
| San Francisco | 10 | – | 8 | .556 | 17 | – | 16 | .515 |
| Portland | 8 | – | 7 | .533 | 20 | – | 11 | .645 |
| Saint Mary's | 9 | – | 9 | .500 | 18 | – | 15 | .545 |
| San Diego | 8 | – | 9 | .471 | 17 | – | 15 | .531 |
| Santa Clara | 8 | – | 10 | .444 | 16 | – | 15 | .516 |
| Pepperdine | 4 | – | 11 | .267 | 8 | – | 17 | .320 |
| Loyola Marymount | 4 | – | 13 | .235 | 11 | – | 19 | .367 |
| Pacific | 3 | – | 14 | .176 | 6 | – | 23 | .207 |
† 2022 WCC tournament winner Rankings from AP poll

The 2022 West Coast Conference women's basketball tournament was held between March 3 and 8 at Orleans Arena in Las Vegas. Gonzaga won the tournament and with it the conference's automatic bid to the NCAA women's basketball tournament.

== Seeds ==
All conference members qualified for the tournament. Teams were seeded based on the Ken Pomeroy Adjusted Conference Winning Percentage.

| Seed | School | Conference | Overall* | Pomeroy AWP |
|---|---|---|---|---|
| 1 | BYU | 15–1 | 25–2 | .921% |
| 2 | Gonzaga | 15–2 | 24–6 | .870% |
| 3 | San Francisco | 10–8 | 16–14 | .555% |
| 4 | Portland | 8–7 | 18–9 | .530% |
| 5 | Saint Mary's | 9–9 | 15–14 | .501% |
| 6 | San Diego | 8–9 | 16–13 | .493% |
| 7 | Santa Clara | 8–10 | 14–14 | .448% |
| 8 | Pepperdine | 4–11 | 8–16 | .257% |
| 9 | Loyola Marymount | 4–13 | 9–18 | .241% |
| 10 | Pacific | 3–14 | 6–22 | .184% |

* Overall record at end of regular season.

== Venue ==
For the fourteenth consecutive year, the 2022 WCC Tournament was held in the Orleans Arena. When Orleans Arena is set up for basketball games, the seating capacity is 7,471. The Orleans Arena is located at the 1,886-room Orleans Hotel and Casino, about 1 mile west of the Las Vegas Strip. The tickets for the WCC Tournament typically sell out quickly.

== Schedule ==
| Session | Game | Time | Matchup | Television |
First round – Thursday March 3, 2022
| 1 | 1 | 12:00 PM | No. 8 Pepperdine 54 vs. No. 9 Loyola Marymount 64 | BYUtv |
| 1 | 2 | 2:00 PM | No. 7 Santa Clara 93 vs. No. 10 Pacific 69 | BYUtv |
Second round – Friday March 4, 2022
| 2 | 3 | 12:00 PM | No. 5 Saint Mary's 64 vs. No. 9 Loyola Marymount 71 | BYUtv |
| 2 | 4 | 2:00 PM | No. 6 San Diego 79 vs. No. 7 Santa Clara 86 | BYUtv |
Quarterfinals – Saturday, March 5, 2022
| 3 | 5 | 1:30 PM | No. 4 Portland 69 vs. No. 9 Loyola Marymount 44 | BYUtv |
| 3 | 6 | 3:30 PM | No. 3 San Francisco 72 vs. No. 7 Santa Clara 63 | BYUtv |
Semifinals – Monday, March 7, 2022
| 4 | 7 | 12:00 PM | No. 1 BYU 59 vs. No. 4 Portland 52 | BYUtv |
| 4 | 8 | 2:00 PM | No. 2 Gonzaga 69 vs. No. 3 San Francisco 55 | BYUtv |
Championship – Tuesday, March 8, 2022
| 5 | 9 | 1:00 PM | No. 1 BYU 59 vs. No. 2 Gonzaga 71 | ESPNU |
Game times in PT. Rankings denote tournament seeding. *denotes overtime game

== Bracket ==
- All games except the championship aired on BYUtv and were simulcast on WCC Network and multiple RSN's: NBC Sports Bay Area, Bally Sports West or Los Angeles, Bally Sports San Diego, and Root Sports. Additional RSN's across the country also aired select games. The championship aired on ESPNU.

Opening round Thursday, March 3
8 | Pepperdine | 54
9 | Loyola Marymount | 64
7 | Santa Clara | 93
10 | Pacific | 69

Second round Friday, March 4
5 | Saint Mary's | 64
9 | Loyola Marymount | 71
6 | San Diego | 79
7 | Santa Clara | 86

Quarterfinals; Saturday, March 5
4 | Portland | 69
9 | Loyola Marymount | 44
3 | San Francisco | 72
7 | Santa Clara | 63

Semifinals; Monday, March 7
1 | BYU | 59
4 | Portland | 52
2 | Gonzaga | 69
3 | San Francisco | 55

Championship; Tuesday, March 8
1 | BYU | 59
2 | Gonzaga | 71

* denotes overtime game

== See also ==
- 2021–22 NCAA Division I women's basketball season
- West Coast Conference men's basketball tournament
- 2022 West Coast Conference men's basketball tournament
- West Coast Conference women's basketball tournament
