= Saint Francis School (Hawaii) =

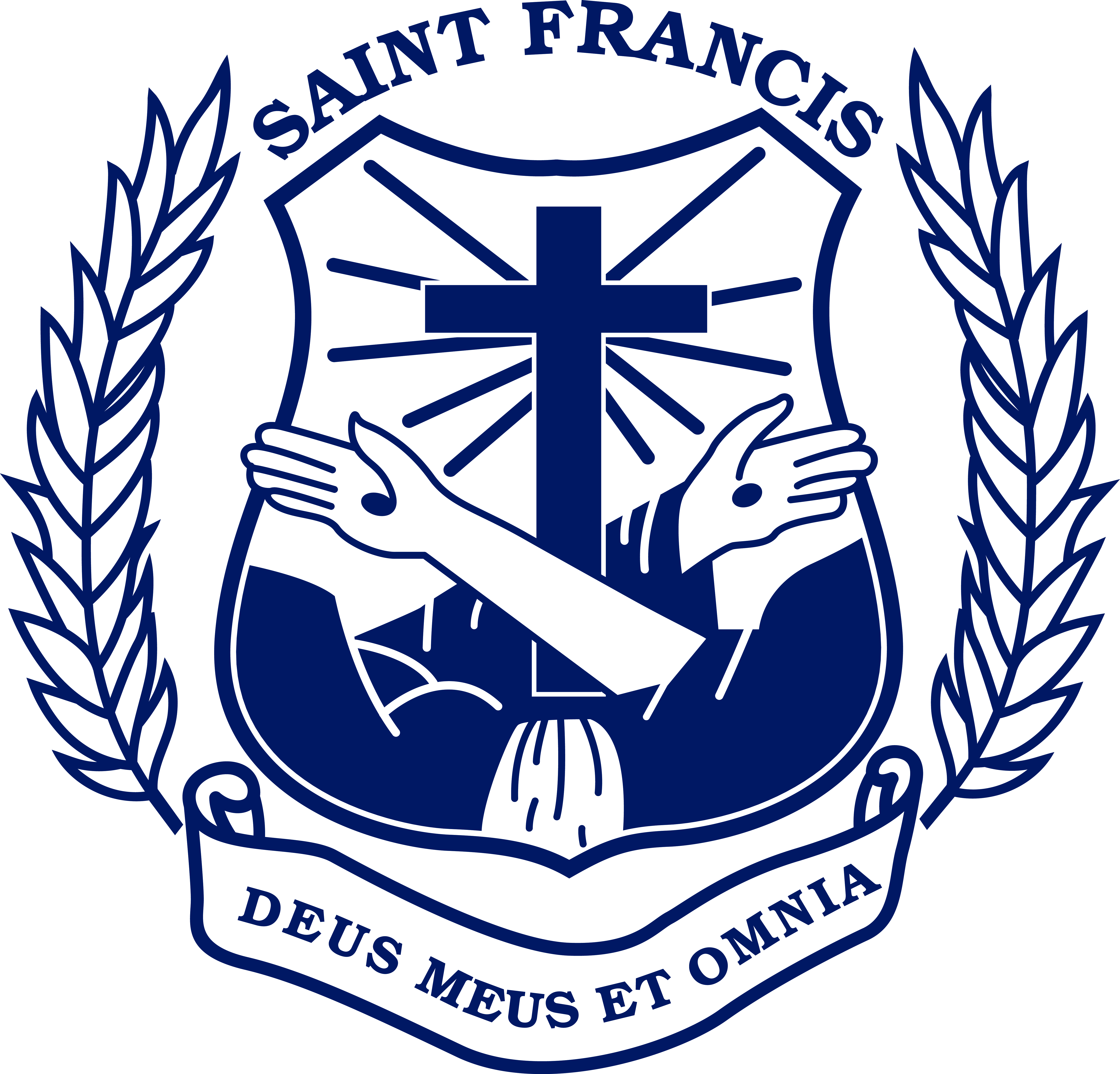

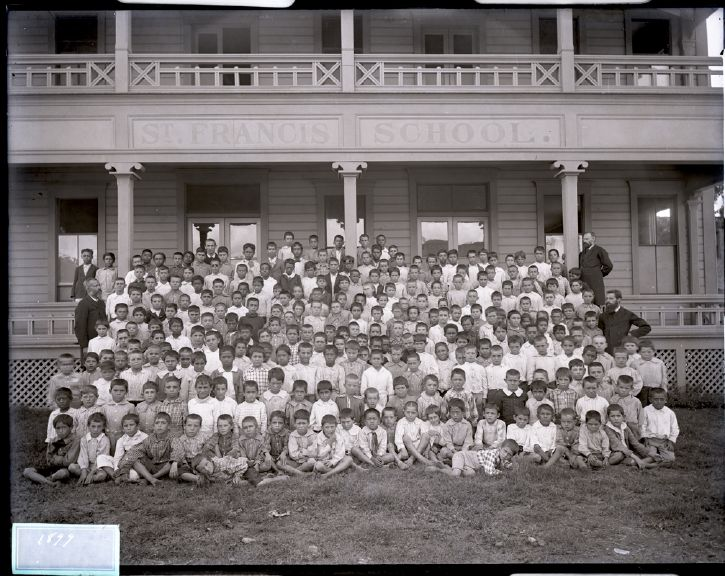
- Saint Francis School in 1899

Location
- 2707 Pamoa Road; Honolulu, Hawaii 96822; United States; 21.304778°N 157.813400°W

Information
- Type: Private, Coeducational
- Motto: Quality Catholic Education in a Spirit of Joy
- Religious affiliation: Catholic Church
- Denomination: Franciscan
- Patron saint: Saint Francis of Assisi
- Established: 1924
- Founder: Sisters of Saint Francis
- Status: Closed
- Closed: 2019
- Head of school: Dr. Casey Asato
- Grades: PK–12
- Enrollment: 450
- Average class size: 20
- Campus: Manoa, Hawaii
- Colors: Carolina Blue & White
- Team name: Saints
- Accreditation: Western Association of Schools and Colleges; Western Catholic Education Association; Hawaii Association of Independent Schools
- Newspaper: Ke 'Alakai
- Yearbook: The Troubadour
- Tuition: $13,000/year 9th-12th
- Website: www.stfrancis-oahu.org

Saint Francis School was a private Roman Catholic school located in Manoa, Honolulu, Hawaii, in the United States. It was founded in 1924 by the Sisters of Saint Francis of the Neumann Communities. It had an enrollment limited to just over 500 in grades PK through 12. The school closed in 2019.

== History ==
The school started at Saint Francis Convent in 1924 to educate young women who joined the Franciscan Sisters. It was founded in memory of Mother Marianne Cope, who came to Hawai‘i in 1883 with six other Franciscan Sisters of the Neumann Communities in answer to the call for aid of victims of this disease by King David Kalākaua.

In the fall of 2006, the school announced that it will be a co-ed school. The school became fully co-ed in school year 2012-2013.

In 2019, after the school's winter break, Saint Francis School was announced to close after the 2018-2019 school year.

After the closure of the school, the Manoa property was listed for sale. In April 2024 the Avalon Group purchased the property for a reported $23.5m. Neighbors of the site are protesting the development saying the main street in and out of the property, Pamoa Lane, cannot handle the density. The Avalon Group has countered saying they've addressed the concerns by scaling back the development.

In 2025 the Hawai`i State Legislature heard HB 548 to have the University of Hawai`i acquire the land due to proximity of their Mānoa campus. The Avalon Group was the only opposition to the bill during Feb 5, 2025 testimony

Notable Alum

Simeona (Ahuna) Mariano—Assistant Attorney General, Hawai'i, c/o 96

Sisa Grey, actor
