= Mānoa, Hawaii =

Neighborhood of Honolulu, Hawaii, US

Mānoa Mānoa Valley
- Neighborhood
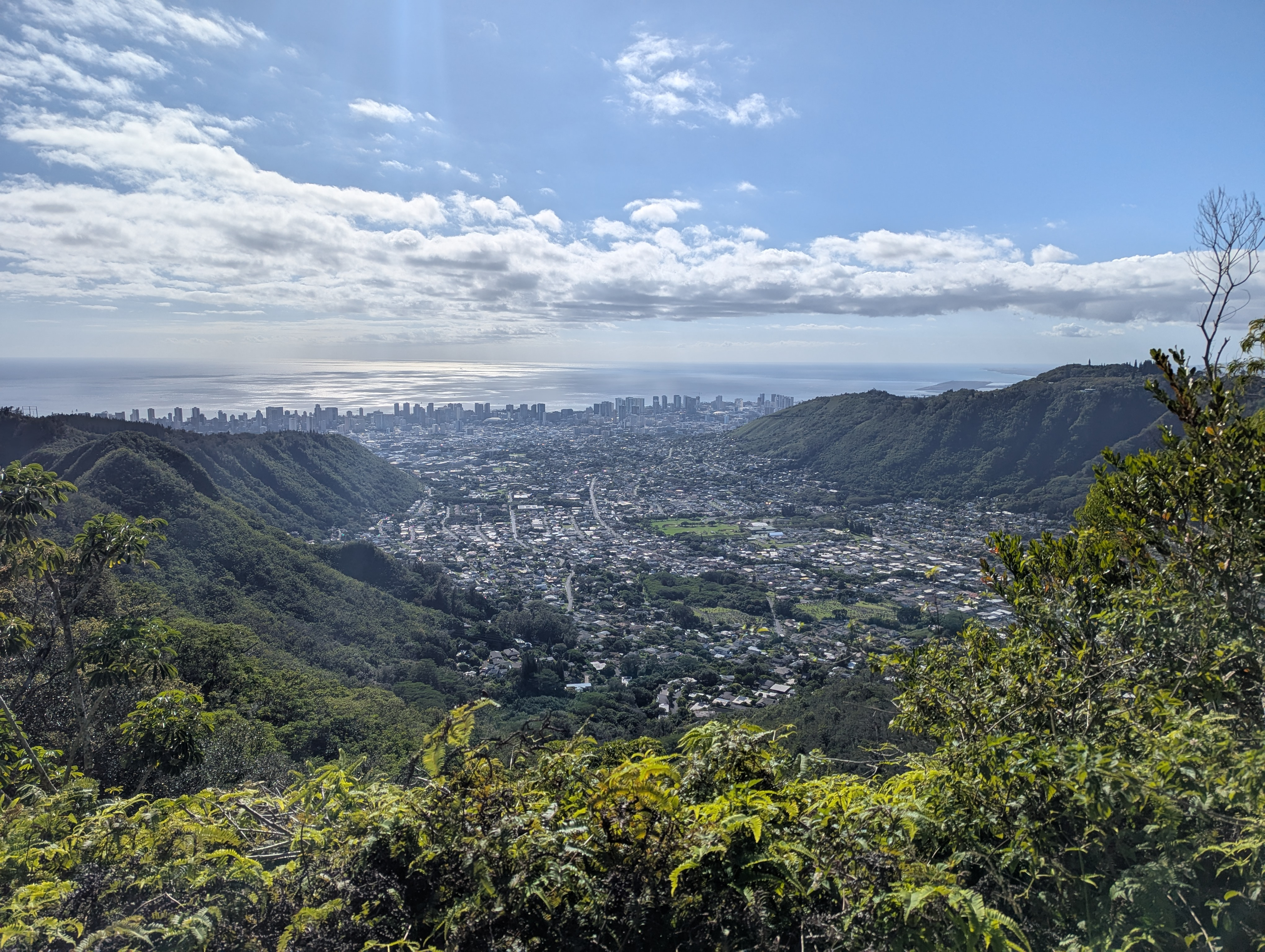
- View of Mānoa from the Koʻolau Range ridge
- Etymology: Hawaiian, meaning "thick" or "vast"
- Interactive map of Mānoa
- Coordinates: 21°18.87916′N 157°48.4846′W
- Country: United States
- State: Hawaii
- City: Honolulu

Mānoa or Mānoa Valley (/ˈmɑːnoʊə/, informally /mɑːˈnoʊə/) is a valley and residential neighborhood of Honolulu, Hawaii. The neighborhood is about 3 miles (4.8 km) east and inland from downtown Honolulu and less than 1 mile (1.6 km) from Ala Moana and Waikīkī.

== Neighborhood ==
Like many Honolulu neighborhoods, Mānoa consists of an entire valley, running from Mānoa Falls at the mauka (inland-most) end to King Street. The valley receives almost daily rain, even during the dry season, and is thus richly vegetated, though the valley walls are often dry. Rainbows are common in the valley, and the University of Hawaiʻi at Mānoa sports teams are the Rainbow Warriors (for men's teams) and Rainbow Wahine (for the women, with the beach volleyball team more often using BeachBows).

The neighborhood comprises private houses built before the 1960s and low-rise condominiums. Mānoa is home to the University of Hawaiʻi at Mānoa, the flagship campus of the University of Hawaiʻi System. The university has several faculty and student residence areas in Mānoa.

Other educational institutions in Mānoa include Mānoa Elementary School, Noelani Elementary School, Punahou School, the Mid-Pacific Institute, Saint Francis School, and a few small, private preschools.

Mānoa's central shopping area is the Mānoa Marketplace, which features a farmer's market several days of the week. More recent development has seen housing on steeper parts of the Diamond Head side valley wall.

== Geography ==
Mānoa means thick, solid, vast, depth, or thickness in the Hawaiian language. Another valley named Mānoa is on the north shore of Kauaʻi.

Mānoa Stream begins at the base of Mānoa Falls and runs through the valley before joining the Palolo Stream to form the Mānoa-Palolo drainage canal, which flows into the Ala Wai Canal. Floods caused by high rainfall have plagued people living along Mānoa Stream. On October 30, 2004, Mānoa Stream overflowed, causing millions of dollars in damages to residential homes and University of Hawaiʻi at Mānoa buildings.

=== Climate ===
Climate data for Mānoa (Lyon Arboretum) 1991–2020 normals, extremes 1975–present
Month	Jan	Feb	Mar	Apr	May	Jun	Jul	Aug	Sep	Oct	Nov	Dec	Year
Record high °F (°C)	88 (31)	87 (31)	90 (32)	86 (30)	88 (31)	89 (32)	89 (32)	90 (32)	92 (33)	91 (33)	90 (32)	88 (31)	92 (33)
Mean daily maximum °F (°C)	76.0 (24.4)	75.9 (24.4)	75.7 (24.3)	76.0 (24.4)	77.7 (25.4)	78.1 (25.6)	79.0 (26.1)	80.1 (26.7)	80.8 (27.1)	80.1 (26.7)	78.0 (25.6)	76.4 (24.7)	77.8 (25.4)
Daily mean °F (°C)	69.6 (20.9)	69.6 (20.9)	69.8 (21.0)	70.7 (21.5)	72.3 (22.4)	73.3 (22.9)	74.4 (23.6)	75.2 (24.0)	75.4 (24.1)	74.7 (23.7)	72.8 (22.7)	70.9 (21.6)	72.4 (22.4)
Mean daily minimum °F (°C)	63.1 (17.3)	63.3 (17.4)	63.9 (17.7)	65.4 (18.6)	66.8 (19.3)	68.4 (20.2)	69.7 (20.9)	70.2 (21.2)	70.0 (21.1)	69.2 (20.7)	67.6 (19.8)	65.4 (18.6)	66.9 (19.4)
Record low °F (°C)	52 (11)	50 (10)	52 (11)	56 (13)	56 (13)	59 (15)	61 (16)	61 (16)	63 (17)	59 (15)	54 (12)	49 (9)	49 (9)
Average rainfall inches (mm)	10.64 (270)	9.14 (232)	13.74 (349)	12.91 (328)	9.32 (237)	12.87 (327)	15.35 (390)	12.66 (322)	12.19 (310)	12.89 (327)	15.08 (383)	14.17 (360)	150.96 (3,834)
Average rainy days (≥ 0.01 in)	18.3	18.0	20.6	24.4	22.5	26.3	28.1	26.8	25.2	24.9	24.1	23.0	282.2
Source: NOAA

== History ==
Mānoa was the site of the first sugarcane and coffee plantations in the Hawaiian Islands. Hawaiian coffee was first introduced along Mānoa Valley in 1813 by Don Francisco de Paula y Marytin as an ornamental plant. In 1825 Chief Boki, the Royal Governor of Oahu, followed up and brought coffee trees back from Brazil on the ship HMS Blonde.

Chief Boki also chose Mānoa Valley as the site of Hawaii's first coffee plantation. With agriculture expert John Wilkinson's help, the coffee trees survived, allowing their descendants to be brought to Kona and other islands many years later. Hawaiʻi is the only US state that produces coffee commercially. For more history see coffee production in Hawaii.

Many legends are associated with Mānoa. In one legend, Kahalaopuna was born to Kahaukani and Kauakuahine. Kahaukani is the wind of Mānoa and Kauakuahine is the rain of Mānoa. Kahaukani and Kauakuahine were brother and sister, both born to Akaaka (the projecting spur of the Mānoa mountain range) and Nalehuaakaaka (the lehua on the brow of the Mānoa ridge).

== Education ==
The Hawaii State Department of Education operates public schools in Mānoa.

The private Saint Francis School was in Mānoa until it closed in 2019.

== Gallery ==
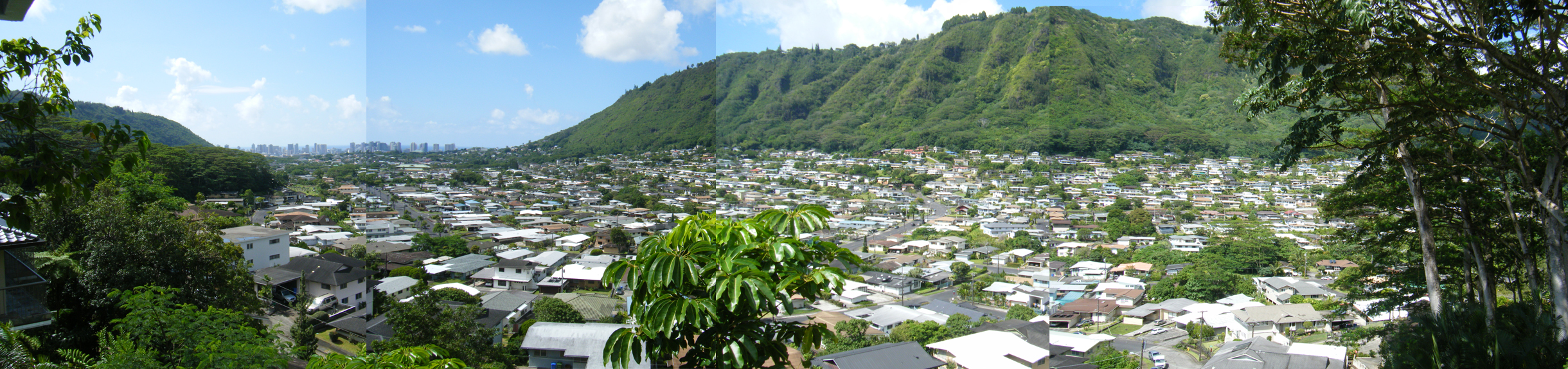
Mānoa Valley panoramic
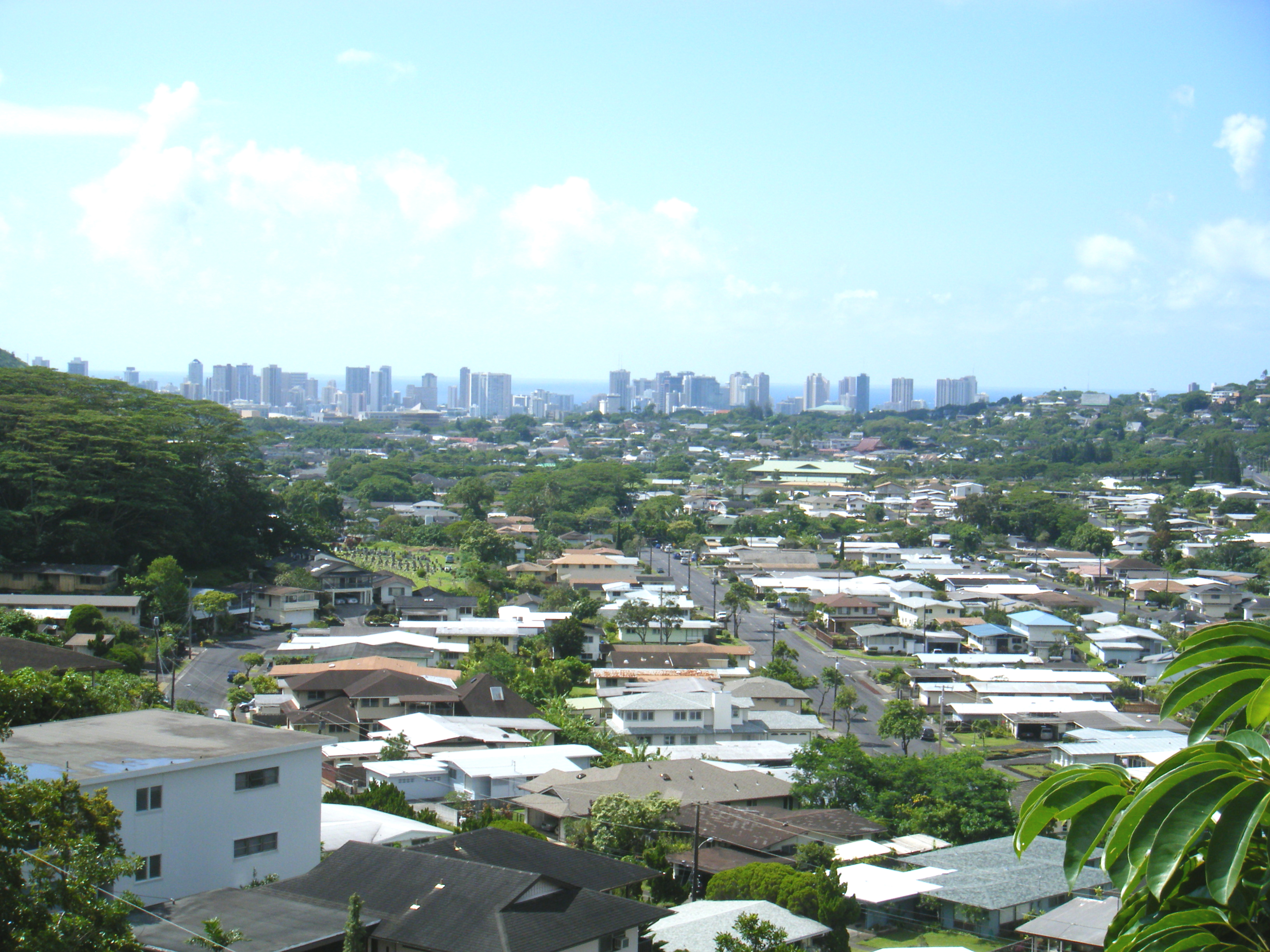
Mānoa Valley facing Waikiki, Honolulu

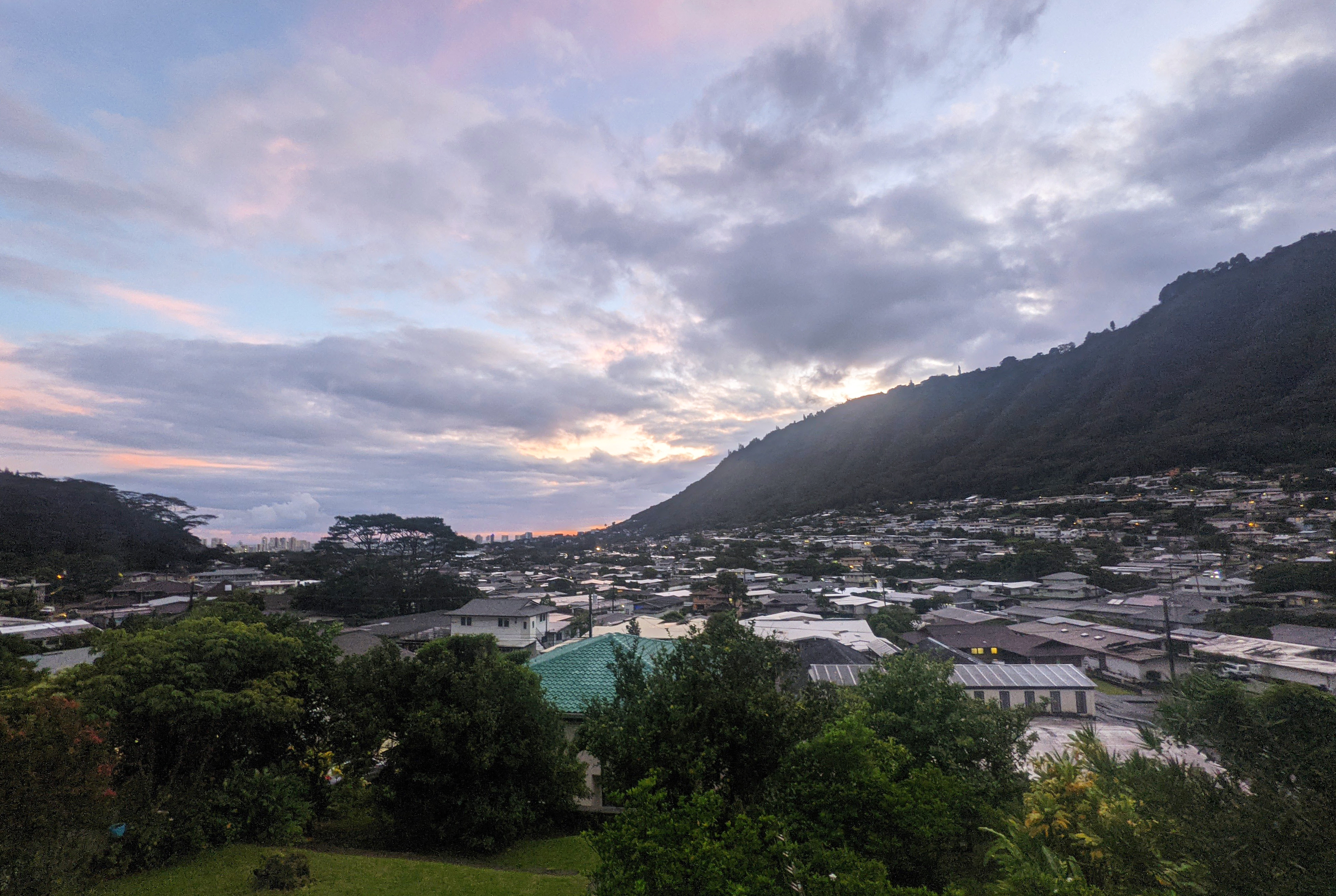
Sunset over Mānoa as seen from the back of the valley

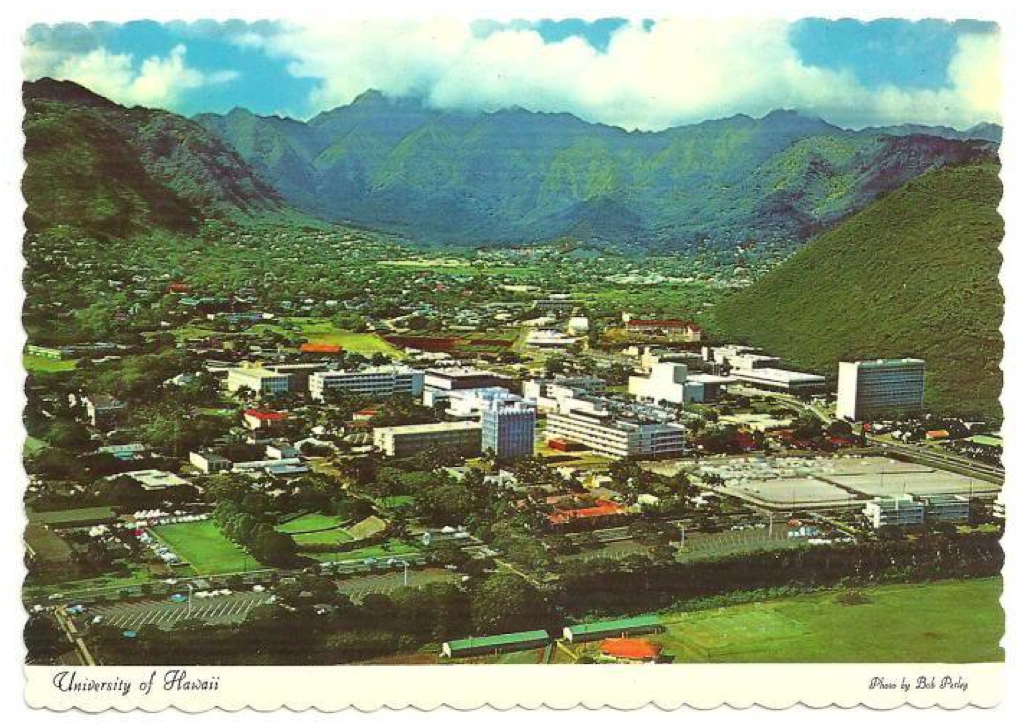
Vintage shot of the University of Hawaiʻi at Mānoa with the back of the valley in the background

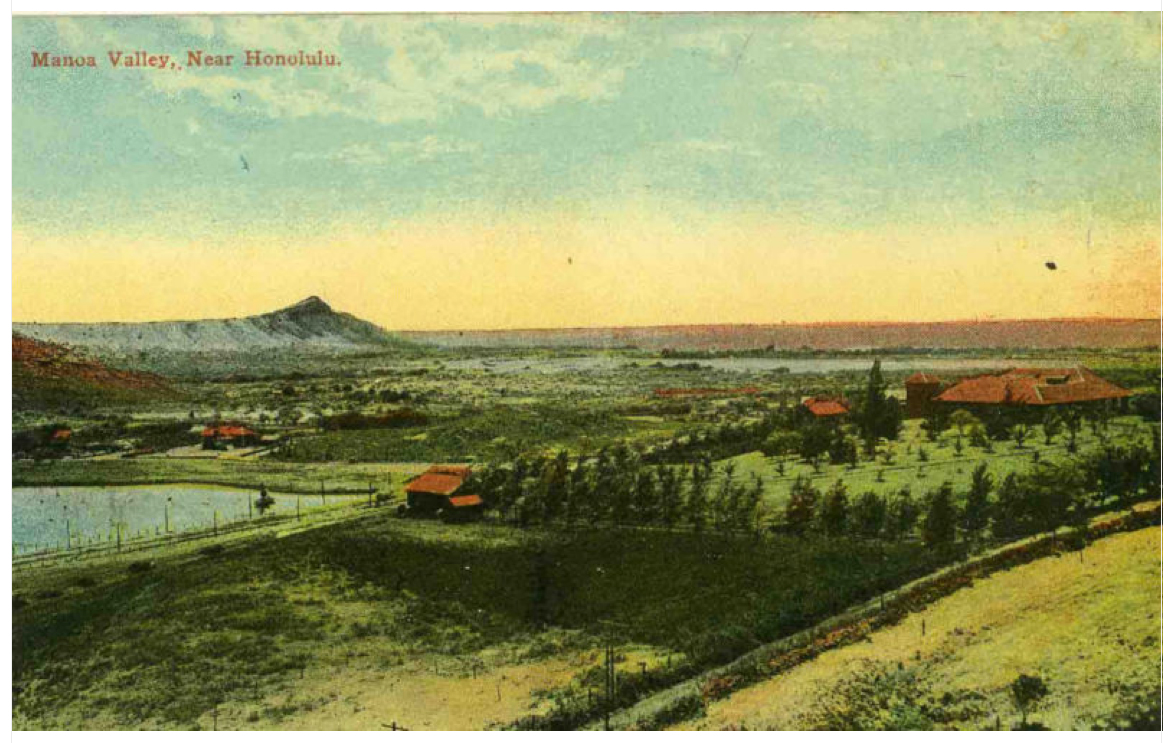
Vintage photo of Mānoa Valley

== Points of interest ==
- Lyon Arboretum
- Mānoa Falls
- Mānoa Falls Trail
- Mānoa Heritage Center
- Salvation Army Waiʻoli Tea Room
- University of Hawaiʻi at Mānoa
