= Lyonia (journal) =

- Discipline: Botany
- Language: English

Publication details
- History: 1974-1989
- Publisher: Harold L. Lyon Arboretum (United States)
- Frequency: semiannual

Standard abbreviations
- ISO 4: Lyonia

Indexing
- ISSN: 0888-9619

Links
- Journal homepage

Lyonia was an electronic, peer-reviewed interdisciplinary scientific journal published by the Harold L. Lyon Arboretum and stored in the ScholarSpace digital institutional repository of the University of Hawaii at Manoa library. The journal was dedicated to the distribution of original ecological research and how it may be implemented in environmental protection. Papers published in Lyonia covered a range of disciplines including ecology, biology, anthropology, economics, law, etc. that pertain to conservation, management, sustainable development, and education in mountain and island settings. The journal was particularly interested in the mountain forests in tropical areas. Lyonia was first published in March 1974 and continued until December 1989.

== See also ==
- Lyon Arboretum
- ScholarSpace
