= Lyon Arboretum =

Arboretum and botanical garden in Honolulu, Hawaii, US

Coordinates: 21°19′58.64″N 157°48′5.82″W

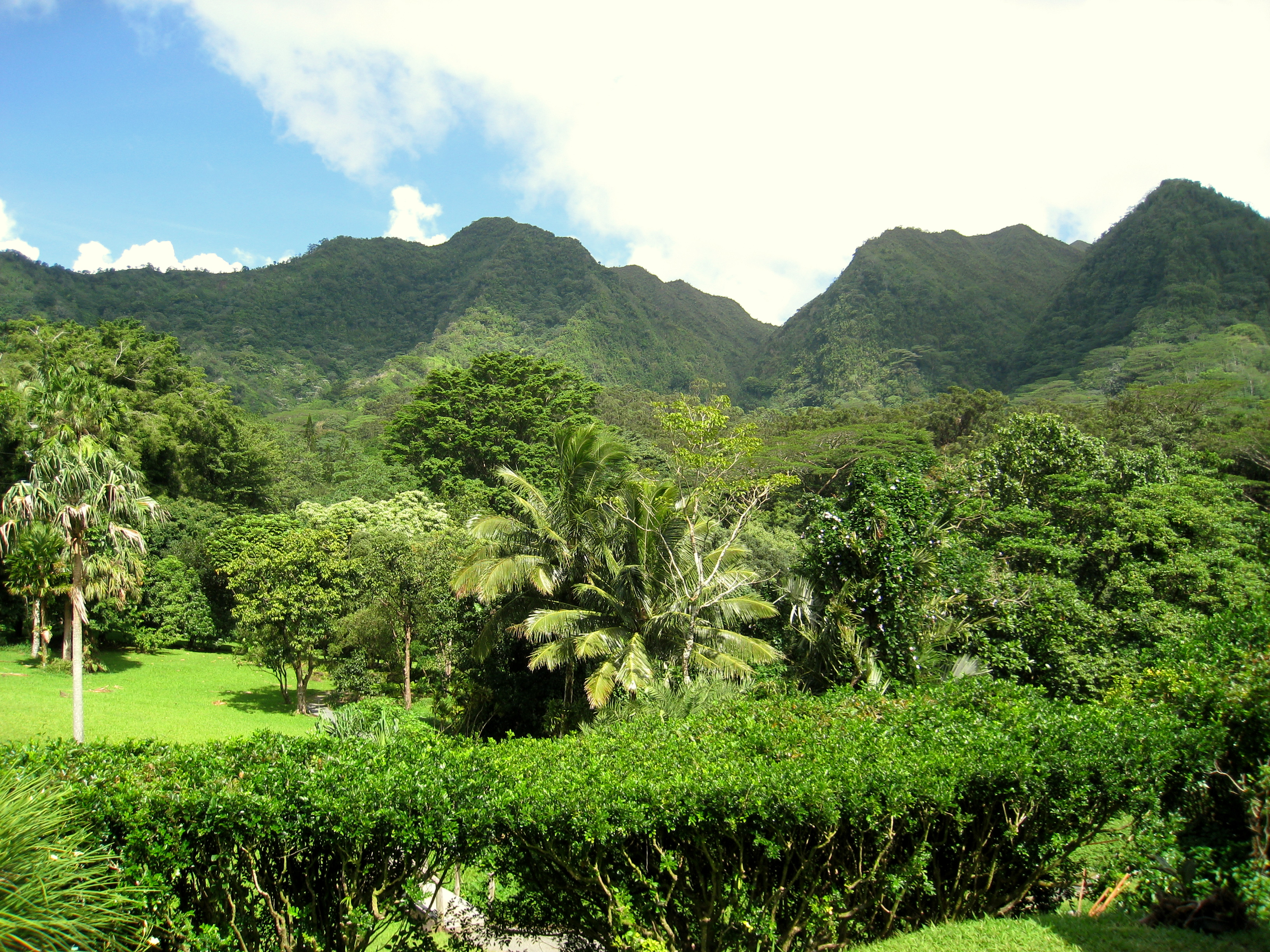
Lyon Arboretum

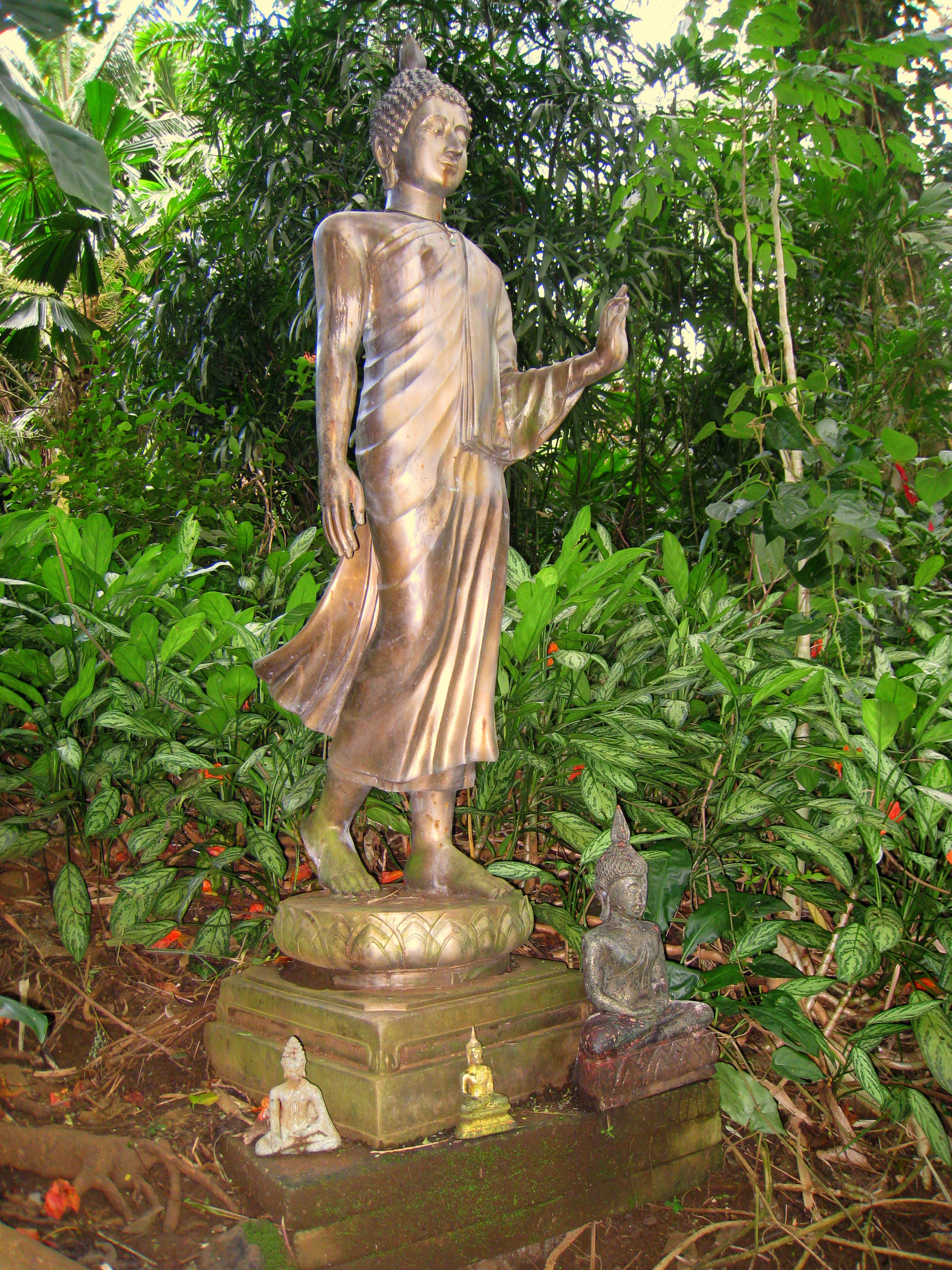
Buddha Statue

The Harold L. Lyon Arboretum is a 200-acre (80.9 ha) arboretum and botanical garden managed by the University of Hawaiʻi at Mānoa located at the upper end of Mānoa Valley in Hawaiʻi.

Much of the Arboretum's botanical collection consists of an artificial lowland tropical rainforest with numerous trails and small water features.

== History ==
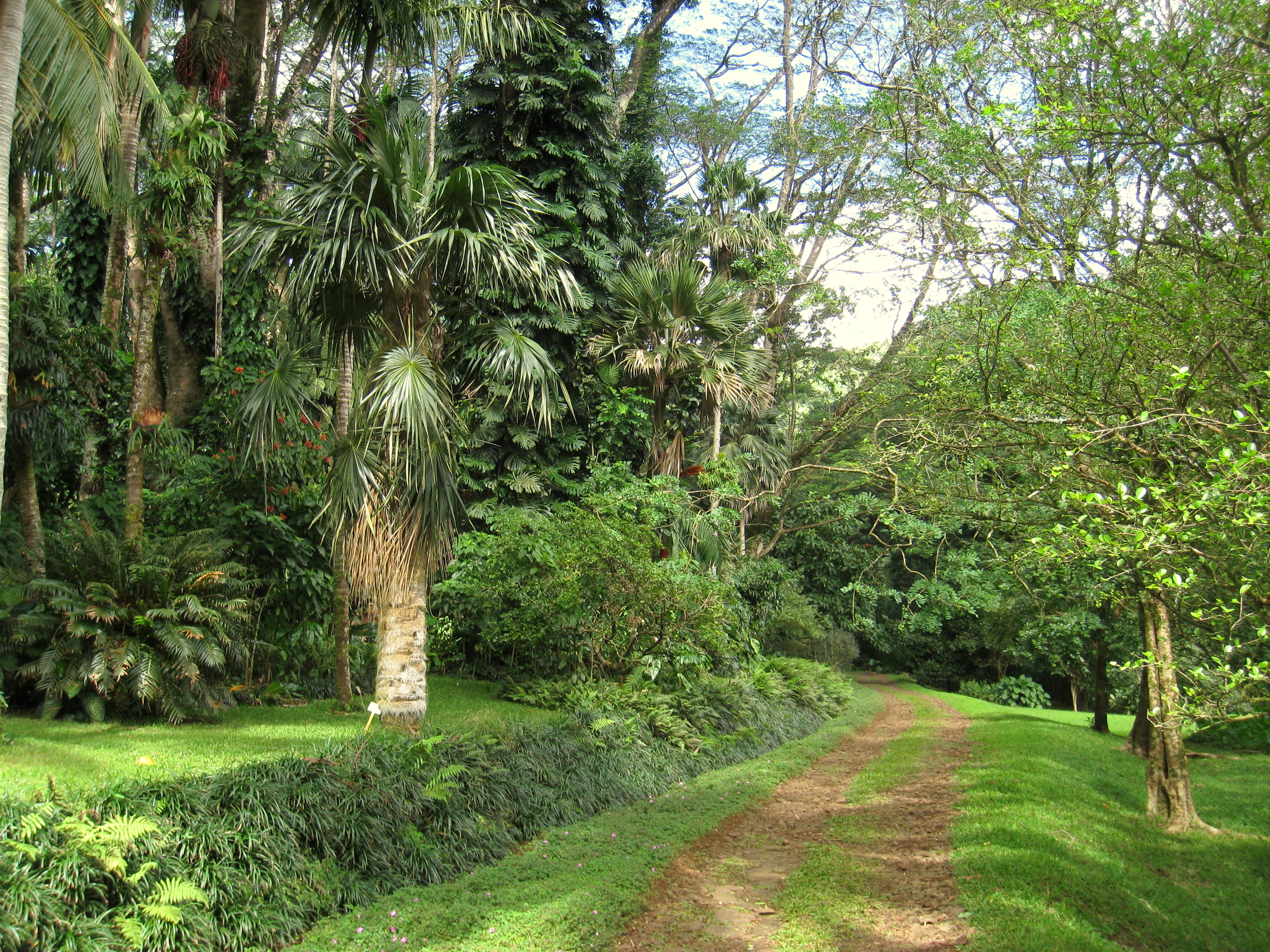
Trail

The Manoa Arboretum was established in 1918 by the Hawaiian Sugar Planters' Association to demonstrate watershed restoration and test various tree species for reforestation, as well as collect living plants of economic value. The original director of the arboretum was Dr. Harold L. Lyon, a botanist from Minnesota who was plant pathologist for the HSPA. During his tenure, Lyon planted nearly 2,000 species of trees on the site.

In 1953, at Lyon's urging, the HSPA conveyed the arboretum site to the University of Hawaiʻi, with the stipulation that the site continue to be used as an arboretum and botanical garden in perpetuity. After Lyon's death in 1957, the arboretum was renamed in his honor.

Today, the Arboretum continues to develop its extensive tropical plant collection, while emphasizing native Hawaiian plants, such as Pritchardia spp. (palms). Its over 15,000 accessions focus primarily on the monocot families of palms, gingers, heliconias, bromeliads, and aroids. Native and Polynesian cultivated and wild species are displayed in the ethnobotanical, native ecosystems, and Hawaiian sections of the gardens.

== Presentation ==
=== Land property ===
Lyon Arboretum is adjacent to land owned by the City & County of Honolulu's Board of Water Supply as well as State conservation land and the site of the former Paradise Park. Paradise Park was a theme park with trained bird shows and the Treetops Restaurant, and is frequently confused with Lyon Arboretum, but these are separate entities. Funds to purchase the Paradise Park parcel were appropriated by the state in 2002, but the purchase was refused in succession by Governors Ben Cayetano and Linda Lingle.

=== Seed bank ===
The Lyon Arboretum also maintains an active seed bank. By 2024, the Seed Conservation Laboratory has banked 33 million seeds, including 300 threatened and endangered plant taxa across 55 families. The seed laboratory is part of the Hawaiian Rare Plant Program (HRPP).

=== Seismograph station ===
The park's abandoned seismograph station has the reputation to be haunted.

== Public hours ==
- Open Monday through Friday from 9 am until 3 pm. Access is limited to reservation only.

== See also ==
- List of botanical gardens in the United States
- Lyonia (journal)
