= 2025 FIBA Women's AmeriCup squads =

Basketball tournament rosters

This article displays the rosters for the teams competing at the 2025 FIBA Women's AmeriCup. Each team had to submit 12 players.

Age and club as of the start of the tournament 28 June 2025.

== Group A ==
=== Argentina ===
The roster was announced on 21 June 2025.

Argentina women's national basketball team roster
Players
Coaches

Pos.	No.	Name	Age – Date of birth	Height	Club	Ctr.
C	3	Julieta Mungo	27 – 6 August 1997	1.81 m (5 ft 11 in)	Oses Ardoi	(Spain)
PG	4	Amaiquen Siciliano	25 – 5 September 1999	1.65 m (5 ft 5 in)	Virtus Eirene Ragusa	(Italy)
SG	5	Flor Martínez	30 – 5 September 1994	1.70 m (5 ft 7 in)	Union Florida	(Argentina)
C	7	Diana Cabrera	31 – 7 August 1993	1.88 m (6 ft 2 in)	Don Bosco	(Spain)
SF	8	Andrea Boquete	34 – 24 September 1990	1.80 m (5 ft 11 in)	Don Bosco	(Spain)
C	10	Agostina Burani	33 – 4 October 1991	1.86 m (6 ft 1 in)	Obras Sanitarias	(Argentina)
PG	11	Melisa Gretter (C)	32 – 24 January 1993	1.67 m (5 ft 6 in)	CAB Estepona	(Spain)
SF	13	Candela Gentinetta	24 – 18 March 2001	1.81 m (5 ft 11 in)	Obras Sanitarias	(Argentina)
SG	14	Florencia Chagas	24 – 27 June 2001	1.80 m (5 ft 11 in)	Obras Sanitarias	(Argentina)
SG	19	Delfina Saravia	22 – 19 May 2003	1.74 m (5 ft 9 in)	Union Florida	(Argentina)
PG	20	Macarena D'Urso	33 – 16 December 1991	1.62 m (5 ft 4 in)	CB Melilla	(Spain)
PF	23	Victoria Gauna	23 – 22 July 2001	1.85 m (6 ft 1 in)	Free agent

Head coach

- (Argentina) Gregorio Martínez

Assistant coach(es)

- (Argentina) Javier Ielmini

Legend

- (C) Team captain
- Club – describes last
  club before the tournament
- Age – describes age
  on 28 June 2025

=== Brazil ===
The roster was announced on 23 June 2025.

Brazil women's national basketball team roster
Players
Coaches

Pos.	No.	Name	Age – Date of birth	Height	Club	Ctr.
SF	5	Ayla McDowell	18 – 9 February 2007	1.86 m (6 ft 1 in)	South Carolina Gamecocks	(United States)
G	8	Bella Nascimento	22 – 21 August 2002	1.64 m (5 ft 5 in)	William & Mary Tribe	(United States)
C	10	Kamilla Cardoso	24 – 30 April 2001	1.98 m (6 ft 6 in)	Chicago Sky	(United States)
SF	11	Emanuely Oliveira	25 – 11 December 1999	1.80 m (5 ft 11 in)	SESI Araraquara	(Brazil)
PF	12	Damiris Dantas (C)	32 – 17 November 1992	1.92 m (6 ft 4 in)	Indiana Fever	(United States)
G	17	Carina Martins	33 – 17 February 1992	1.75 m (5 ft 9 in)	Sampaio	(Brazil)
PF	18	Aline Moura	27 – 4 July 1997	1.85 m (6 ft 1 in)	SESI Araraquara	(Brazil)
C	21	Manu Alves	19 – 2 January 2006	1.90 m (6 ft 3 in)	Illinois Fighting Illini	(United States)
F	22	Vitória Marcelino	29 – 5 June 1996	1.78 m (5 ft 10 in)	SESI Araraquara	(Brazil)
PG	24	Alana Gonçalo	30 – 23 September 1994	1.66 m (5 ft 5 in)	Corinthians	(Brazil)
F	26	Thayná Silva	29 – 27 January 1996	1.80 m (5 ft 11 in)	Sampaio	(Brazil)
SF	30	Catarina Ferreira	24 – 14 January 2001	1.80 m (5 ft 11 in)	Oregon State Beavers	(United States)

Head coach

- (United States) Pokey Chatman

Assistant coach(es)

- (Brazil) Léo Figueiró

Legend

- (C) Team captain
- Club – describes current club
- Age – describes age
  on 28 June 2025

=== Canada ===
A 16-player roster was announced on 9 June 2025.

Canada women's national basketball team roster
Players
Coaches

Pos.	No.	Name	Age – Date of birth	Height	Club	Ctr.
G	2	Shay Colley	29 – 6 January 1996	1.76 m (5 ft 9 in)	Chartres	(France)
G	3	Delaney Gibb	19 – 27 August 2005	1.79 m (5 ft 10 in)	BYU Cougars	(United States)
G	4	Sami Hill	30 – 22 November 1994	1.78 m (5 ft 10 in)	Araski	(Spain)
F	7	Niyah Becker	24 – 14 October 2000	1.88 m (6 ft 2 in)	CB Islas Canarias	(Spain)
SF	8	Tara Wallack	21 – 2 July 2003	1.81 m (5 ft 11 in)	Tarbes Gespe Bigorre	(France)
PF	9	Yvonne Ejim	23 – 9 April 2002	1.83 m (6 ft 0 in)	IDK Euskotren	(Spain)
C	10	Emily Potter	29 – 10 October 1995	1.96 m (6 ft 5 in)	ŽKK Crvena zvezda	(Serbia)
G	12	Syla Swords	19 – 28 January 2006	1.83 m (6 ft 0 in)	Michigan Wolverines	(United States)
SG	13	Merissah Russell	23 – 3 March 2002	1.80 m (5 ft 11 in)	Louisville Cardinals	(United States)
C	14	Kayla Alexander (C)	34 – 5 January 1991	1.93 m (6 ft 4 in)	Valencia Basket	(Spain)
C	15	Phillipina Kyei	21 – 5 October 2003	2.01 m (6 ft 7 in)	Maccabi Haifa	(Israel)
PG	30	Shayeann Day-Wilson	22 – 16 June 2003	1.67 m (5 ft 6 in)	LSU Tigers	(United States)

Head coach

- (United States) Nell Fortner

Assistant coach(es)

- (Canada) Carly Clarke

Legend

- (C) Team captain
- Club – describes last
  club before the tournament
- Age – describes age
  on 28 June 2025

=== Dominican Republic ===
The roster was announced on 20 June 2025.

Dominican Republic women's national basketball team roster
Players
Coaches

Pos.	No.	Name	Age – Date of birth	Height	Club	Ctr.
PG	1	Glorivel Rodríguez	21 – 15 June 2004	1.63 m (5 ft 4 in)
SF	3	Cesarina Cappelan	21 – 3 July 2003	1.78 m (5 ft 10 in)	B. F. León	(Spain)
G	5	Yohanna Morton (C)	37 – 12 December 1987	1.72 m (5 ft 8 in)	Valladolid	(Spain)
F	6	Yenifer Jiménez	26 – 1 January 1999	1.75 m (5 ft 9 in)
G	7	Genesis Evangelista	32 – 25 February 1993	1.80 m (5 ft 11 in)	Mauricio Báez BC	(Dominican Republic)
PG	8	Yamel Abreu	29 – 23 August 1995	1.70 m (5 ft 7 in)	Pueblo Nuevo BC	(Dominican Republic)
PF	9	Madelyn Batista	24 – 5 August 2000	1.89 m (6 ft 2 in)	San Lazaro Club	(Dominican Republic)
C	13	Giocelis Reynoso	29 – 11 December 1995	1.90 m (6 ft 3 in)	Club Calero	(Dominican Republic)
PG	15	Yirsy Quéliz	21 – 19 April 2004	1.74 m (5 ft 9 in)	Olímpicas de La Vega	(Dominican Republic)
F	21	Anyi Hodge	28 – 23 June 1997	1.82 m (6 ft 0 in)
G	24	Hellary de los Santos	23 – 6 January 2002	1.78 m (5 ft 10 in)	Olímpicas de La Vega	(Dominican Republic)
C	44	Ileana Sosa	22 – 3 June 2003	1.86 m (6 ft 1 in)	Club Ivan Guzman	(Dominican Republic)

Head coach

- (Dominican Republic) Alberto Zabala

Assistant coach(es)

- (Cuba) Ariel Portuondo

Legend

- (C) Team captain
- Club – describes last
  club before the tournament
- Age – describes age
  on 28 June 2025

=== El Salvador ===
A 14-player roster was announced on 16 May 2025.

El Salvador women's national basketball team roster
Players
Coaches

Pos.	No.	Name	Age – Date of birth	Height	Club	Ctr.
SG	4	Hilary Martínez	28 – 12 April 1997	1.75 m (5 ft 9 in)	Salvadoreñas	(Mexico)
SF	5	Ana Quijano	19 – 19 December 2005	1.60 m (5 ft 3 in)	Salvadoreñas	(El Salvador)
F	7	Liliana Alvarado	27 – 29 July 1997	1.70 m (5 ft 7 in)	Salvadoreñas	(El Salvador)
SF	7	Gabriela Escobar	18 – 19 March 2007	1.65 m (5 ft 5 in)	FESA	(El Salvador)
C	9	Silvia Vega	22 – 27 April 2003	1.84 m (6 ft 0 in)	Salvadoreñas	(El Salvador)
F	10	Emily Tévez	22 – 4 March 2003	1.75 m (5 ft 9 in)	Salvadoreñas	(El Salvador)
F	11	Elisa Domínguez (C)	24 – 20 July 2000	1.65 m (5 ft 5 in)	Salvadoreñas	(El Salvador)
PG	14	Adriana Rivas	29 – 11 May 1996	1.76 m (5 ft 9 in)	San Salvador	(El Salvador)
PG	16	Fátima Avilés	26 – 9 June 1999	1.60 m (5 ft 3 in)	Salvadoreñas	(El Salvador)
C	22	Kimberly Villalobos	23 – 10 December 2001	1.88 m (6 ft 2 in)	Salvadoreñas	(El Salvador)
PG	24	Gabriela Alfaro	21 – 11 February 2004	1.69 m (5 ft 7 in)	Salvadoreñas	(El Salvador)
C	44	Brandi Harves-Carr	30 – 16 September 1994	1.93 m (6 ft 4 in)	Salvadoreñas	(El Salvador)

Head coach

- (Spain) José Santana

Assistant coach(es)

- (El Salvador) Ernesto Rodríguez

Legend

- (C) Team captain
- Club – describes last
  club before the tournament
- Age – describes age
  on 28 June 2025

== Group B ==
=== Chile ===
Chile women's national basketball team roster
Players
Coaches

Pos.	No.	Name	Age – Date of birth	Height	Club	Ctr.
PG	1	Damaris Alarcon	21 – 1 July 2003	1.67 m (5 ft 6 in)	Municipal Puente Alto	(Chile)
PG	2	Javiera Campos	22 – 5 July 2002	1.63 m (5 ft 4 in)	Los Leones de Quilpué	(Chile)
PF	3	Valentina Ojeda	22 – 27 February 2003	1.80 m (5 ft 11 in)
G	4	Amanda Guineo	17 – 4 September 2007	1.60 m (5 ft 3 in)	Sportiva Italiana	(Chile)
SF	7	Catalina Pérez	27 – 10 August 1997	1.73 m (5 ft 8 in)	Sportiva Italiana	(Chile)
SF	8	Antonia Andaur	23 – 3 January 2002	1.69 m (5 ft 7 in)	Municipal Puente Alto	(Chile)
PG	9	Catalina Ramírez	22 – 3 January 2003	1.81 m (5 ft 11 in)	Municipal Puente Alto	(Chile)
PF	10	Bárbara Cousiño (C)	29 – 23 May 1996	1.78 m (5 ft 10 in)	UdeC	(Chile)
C	11	Valentina Monzo	22 – 6 February 2003	1.88 m (6 ft 2 in)
C	12	Constanza Cardenas	27 – 18 June 1998	1.85 m (6 ft 1 in)	UdeC	(Chile)
G	22	Jovanka Ljubetic	25 – 15 April 2000	1.78 m (5 ft 10 in)	Los Leones de Quilpué	(Chile)
PF	25	Catalina Abuyeres	28 – 25 February 1997	1.82 m (6 ft 0 in)	Universidad de Chile	(Chile)

Head coach

- (Argentina) Cristian Santander

Assistant coach(es)

- (Chile) Julia Acevedo

Legend

- (C) Team captain
- Club – describes last
  club before the tournament
- Age – describes age
  on 28 June 2025

=== Colombia ===
Colombia women's national basketball team roster
Players
Coaches

Pos.	No.	Name	Age – Date of birth	Height	Club	Ctr.
SG	0	Marta Moscarella	17 – 9 October 2007	1.80 m (5 ft 11 in)	Magnolia Basket Campobasso	(Italy)
F	5	Daihana Murillo	22 – 7 September 2002	1.72 m (5 ft 8 in)
C	6	Yuliany Paz	25 – 20 June 2000	1.93 m (6 ft 4 in)	Indeportes Antioquia	(Colombia)
PG	7	Mayra Caicedo	25 – 12 January 2000	1.61 m (5 ft 3 in)	Indeportes Antioquia	(Colombia)
PG	8	Carolina López	26 – 18 August 1998	1.65 m (5 ft 5 in)	Indeportes Antioquia	(Colombia)
PG	9	Manuela Ríos	28 – 25 January 1997	1.63 m (5 ft 4 in)	Sportiva Italiana	(Chile)
F	10	Mabel Martínez	? – 28 October 1986	1.78 m (5 ft 10 in)	Indeportes Antioquia	(Colombia)
SG	12	Jennifer Muñoz (C)	34 – 1 February 1991	1.71 m (5 ft 7 in)	Indeportes Antioquia	(Colombia)
C	14	Marlyn Venté	29 – 8 July 1995	1.85 m (6 ft 1 in)	Indeportes Antioquia	(Colombia)
PF	19	Daniela González	22 – 28 July 2002	1.80 m (5 ft 11 in)
C	21	Valentina López	26 – 25 April 1999	1.75 m (5 ft 9 in)	Indeportes Antioquia	(Colombia)
SG	22	Esperanza Delgado	29 – 9 March 1996	1.70 m (5 ft 7 in)	BC Neptūnas	(Lithuania)

Head coach

- (Colombia) Luis Cuenca

Assistant coach(es)

- (Colombia) Ricardo Pinzon

Legend

- (C) Team captain
- Club – describes last
  club before the tournament
- Age – describes age
  on 28 June 2025

=== Mexico ===
Mexico women's national basketball team roster
Players
Coaches

Pos.	No.	Name	Age – Date of birth	Height	Club	Ctr.
F	2	Anisa Jeffreis	21 – 13 April 2004	1.81 m (5 ft 11 in)	Borregos Salvajes	(Mexico)
G	5	Karina Esquer	23 – 20 September 2001	1.68 m (5 ft 6 in)	Borregos Salvajes	(Mexico)
F	6	Mariana Valenzuela	22 – 1 April 2003	1.88 m (6 ft 2 in)	Seton Hall Pirates	(United States)
SF	7	Karla Martínez	25 – 7 June 2000	1.80 m (5 ft 11 in)	Panteras de Aguascalientes	(Mexico)
F	10	Claudia Ramos	27 – 27 August 1997	1.83 m (6 ft 0 in)	Fuerza Regia de Monterrey	(Mexico)
F	11	Gabriela Jaquez	21 – 19 November 2003	1.83 m (6 ft 0 in)	UCLA Bruins	(United States)
C	13	Myriam Lara (C)	30 – 22 July 1994	1.88 m (6 ft 2 in)	KB Tirana	(Albania)
PG	14	Alexia Lagunas	27 – 24 April 1998	1.75 m (5 ft 9 in)	El Calor de Cancún	(Puerto Rico)
PG	22	Hazel Ramírez	33 – 7 June 1992	1.67 m (5 ft 6 in)	Libélulas de CDMX	(Mexico)
G	31	Mayra Gil	21 – 13 December 2003	1.74 m (5 ft 9 in)	Freseros de Irapuato	(Mexico)
F	33	Ariadna Vidales	18 – 21 March 2007	1.77 m (5 ft 10 in)
PG	44	Katia Gallegos	23 – 23 August 2001	1.68 m (5 ft 6 in)	Adelitas de Chihuahua	(Mexico)

Head coach

- (United States) Desralee Abeyta

Assistant coach(es)

- (United States) David Elliott

Legend

- (C) Team captain
- Club – describes last
  club before the tournament
- Age – describes age
  on 28 June 2025

=== Puerto Rico ===
The roster was announced on 20 June 2025.

Puerto Rico women's national basketball team roster
Players
Coaches

Pos.	No.	Name	Age – Date of birth	Height	Club	Ctr.
F	1	Tayra Meléndez	30 – 29 October 1993	1.80 m (5 ft 11 in)	Gigantes de Carolina	(Puerto Rico)
SG	2	Brianna Jones	28 – 9 February 1997	1.85 m (6 ft 1 in)	Cangrejeros de Santurce	(Puerto Rico)
PG	5	Pamela Rosado	39 – 30 April 1986	1.65 m (5 ft 5 in)	Montañeras de Morovis	(Puerto Rico)
C	11	Sofía Roma	28 – 21 November 1996	1.83 m (6 ft 0 in)	Ganaderas de Hatillo	(Puerto Rico)
G	12	Ahlana Smith	24 – 17 November 2000	1.75 m (5 ft 9 in)	GDESSA/Barreiro	(Portugal)
PG	15	Angelica Vélez	20 – 2 November 2004	1.74 m (5 ft 9 in)
PF	21	Mya Hollingshed	25 – 29 October 1999	1.93 m (6 ft 4 in)	Liaoning Flying Eagles	(China)
G	22	Arella Guirantes	27 – 15 October 1997	1.80 m (5 ft 11 in)	Shanghai Swordfish	(China)
PG	23	Trinity San Antonio	21 – 28 October 2003	1.74 m (5 ft 9 in)	Grand Canyon Antelopes	(United States)
F	25	Denise Solís	23 – 6 October 2001	1.88 m (6 ft 2 in)
C	33	India Pagán	26 – 7 January 1999	1.87 m (6 ft 2 in)	Atenienses de Manati	(Puerto Rico)
G	55	Jacqueline Benítez	28 – 6 June 1997	1.78 m (5 ft 10 in)	Atenienses de Manati	(Puerto Rico)

Head coach

- (Puerto Rico) Jerry Batista

Assistant coach(es)

- (Puerto Rico) Jorge Otero

Legend

- (C) Team captain
- Club – describes last
  club before the tournament
- Age – describes age
  on 28 June 2025

=== United States ===
The roster was announced on 19 June 2025.

United States women's national basketball team roster
Players
Coaches

Pos.	No.	Name	Age – Date of birth	Height	Club	Ctr.
G	4	Flau'jae Johnson	21 – 3 November 2003	1.78 m (5 ft 10 in)	LSU Tigers	(United States)
G	5	Olivia Miles	22 – 29 January 2003	1.78 m (5 ft 10 in)	TCU Horned Frogs	(United States)
G	6	Hannah Hidalgo	20 – 22 February 2005	1.70 m (5 ft 7 in)	Notre Dame Fighting Irish	(United States)
G	7	Mikayla Blakes	19 – 29 December 2005	1.72 m (5 ft 8 in)	Vanderbilt Commodores	(United States)
F	8	Madison Booker	20 – 29 April 2005	1.83 m (6 ft 0 in)	Texas Longhorns	(United States)
G	9	Gianna Kneepkens	22 – 4 March 2003	1.82 m (6 ft 0 in)	UCLA Bruins	(United States)
F	10	Hannah Stuelke	21 – 10 July 2003	1.88 m (6 ft 2 in)	Iowa Hawkeyes	(United States)
F	11	Kennedy Smith	19 – 21 January 2006	1.85 m (6 ft 1 in)	USC Trojans	(United States)
F	12	Joyce Edwards (C)	20 – 30 January 2005	1.90 m (6 ft 3 in)	South Carolina Gamecocks	(United States)
C	13	Raegan Beers	21 – 23 July 2003	1.93 m (6 ft 4 in)	Oklahoma Sooners	(United States)
F	14	Grace VanSlooten	21 – 16 June 2004	1.90 m (6 ft 3 in)	Michigan State Spartans	(United States)
C	15	Audi Crooks	20 – 13 December 2004	1.91 m (6 ft 3 in)	Iowa State Cyclones	(United States)

Head coach

- (United States) Kara Lawson

Assistant coach(es)

- (United States) DeLisha Milton-Jones

Legend

- (C) Team captain
- Club – describes last
  club before the tournament
- Age – describes age
  on 28 June 2025
