= 2024 South American Women's Basketball Championship =

Tournament details
- Host country: Chile
- City: Santiago
- Dates: 31 August – 7 September
- Teams: 9
- Venue: 1 (in 1 host city)

Final positions
- Champions: Argentina (3rd title)
- Runners-up: Brazil
- Third place: Colombia
- Fourth place: Venezuela

Tournament statistics
- Games played: 24
- MVP: (Argentina) Florencia Chagas
- Top scorer: (Brazil) Emanuely de Oliveira (16.3 ppg)

Official website
- Official website (in Spanish)

The 2024 South American Women's Basketball Championship, branded as FIBA South American Women's Championship Chile 2024 was the 38th edition of the tournament. Nine teams featured in the competition, held at the Centro de Deportes Colectivos in Santiago, Chile, from 31 August to 7 September 2024. The top three teams qualified for the 2025 FIBA Women's AmeriCup besides Chile who automatically qualified as host.

Argentina won their third title after a win over Brazil.

== Preliminary round ==
=== Group A ===
Pos	Team	Pld	W	L	PF	PA	PD	Pts	Qualification
1	Argentina	4	4	0	333	193	+140	8	Semifinals
2	Brazil	4	3	1	304	217	+87	7	Semifinals
3	Chile (H)	4	2	2	246	281	−35	6	5–8th place semifinals
4	Bolivia	4	1	3	222	298	−76	5	5–8th place semifinals
5	Uruguay	4	0	4	215	331	−116	4	

Source: FIBA
Rules for classification: 1) Points; 2) Head-to-head results; 3) Points difference; 4) Points scored.
(H) Hosts

31 August 2024
17:30

Boxscore

Brazil	48–75	Argentina
Scoring by quarter: 16–17, 13–12, 9–24, 10–22
Pts: De Oliveira 20; Rebs: Gonçalves 9 Asts: Nicoletti 6		Pts: Chagas 15; Rebs: Gretter 8 Asts: Gretter 7

Centro de Deportes Colectivos, Santiago
Attendance: 1,500
Referees: Kristian Páez (ECU), Carlos Vélez (COL), Julirys Guzmán (PUR)

31 August 2024
20:00

Boxscore

Chile	80–64	Uruguay
Scoring by quarter: 14–16, 23–19, 21–13, 22–16
Pts: Ovalle 23; Rebs: Cousiño 9 Asts: Ovalle 6		Pts: Fernández 20; Rebs: Niski 8 Asts: Pereira 6

Centro de Deportes Colectivos, Santiago
Attendance: 3,152
Referees: Carmelo de la Rosa (PUR), Lauren Niemiera (USA), Carlos Pallares (COL)

1 September 2024
17:30

Boxscore

Uruguay	50–87	Brazil
Scoring by quarter: 18–25, 12–14, 3–24, 17–24
Pts: Fernández 9 Rebs: Auza 9 Asts: Zeballos 4		Pts: De Oliveira 18; Rebs: Gonçalves 10; Asts: Nicoletti 8

Centro de Deportes Colectivos, Santiago
Referees: Orlando Varela (HON), Nicolás Flores (PAR), Carlos Pallares (COL)

1 September 2024
20:00

Boxscore

Bolivia	50–79	Chile
Scoring by quarter: 10–16, 13–24, 16–23, 11–16
Pts: Padilla 13; Rebs: Eguez 7 Asts: De la Barra, Eguez 3		Pts: Gómez 14; Rebs: Gómez 8 Asts: Campos, Pérez 4

Centro de Deportes Colectivos, Santiago
Referees: Kristian Páez (ECU), Julirys Guzmán (PUR), Lauren Niemiera (USA)

2 September 2024
17:30

Boxscore

Brazil	83–47	Bolivia
Scoring by quarter: 16–15, 22–14, 28–11, 17–7
Pts: Moura 14; Rebs: Guimarães 11; Asts: Martins 10		Pts: Herbas 16; Rebs: Herbas 8 Asts: De la Barra 3

Centro de Deportes Colectivos, Santiago
Referees: Orlando Varela (HON), Carmelo de la Rosa (PUR), Carlos Pallares (COL)

2 September 2024
20:00

Boxscore

Argentina	97–45	Uruguay
Scoring by quarter: 30–7, 18–11, 21–19, 28–8
Pts: Chagas 17; Rebs: Cabrera, D'Urso 7 Asts: D'Urso 7		Pts: Zeballos 13; Rebs: four players 4 Asts: Auza, Pereira 2

Centro de Deportes Colectivos, Santiago
Attendance: 229
Referees: Carlos Vélez (COL), Nicolás Flores (PAR), Julirys Guzmán (PUR)

3 September 2024
17:30

Boxscore

Bolivia	58–80	Argentina
Scoring by quarter: 15–26, 13–20, 18–20, 12–14
Pts: De la Barra 13; Rebs: Herbas 10; Asts: De La Barra 5		Pts: Siciliano 21; Rebs: Gentinetta 7 Asts: Gretter 8

Centro de Deportes Colectivos, Santiago
Attendance: 162
Referees: Lauren Niemiera (USA), Orlando Varela (HON), Carmelo de la Rosa (PUR)

3 September 2024
20:00

Boxscore

Chile	45–86	Brazil
Scoring by quarter: 11–25, 14–22, 17–18, 3–21
Pts: Ovalle 12; Rebs: Basaez, Ovalle 5 Asts: Basaez 6		Pts: De Oliveira 23; Rebs: Rodrigues 19; Asts: Martins 11

Centro de Deportes Colectivos, Santiago
Attendance: 1,032
Referees: Kristian Páez (ECU), Nicolás Flores (PAR), Carlos Pallares (COL)

4 September 2024
17:30

Boxscore

Uruguay	56–67	Bolivia
Scoring by quarter: 13–13, 14–11, 18–15, 11–28
Pts: Zeballos 13; Rebs: Molina 13; Asts: Fernández 8		Pts: Padilla 16; Rebs: Herbas 6 Asts: Padilla 5

Centro de Deportes Colectivos, Santiago
Referees: Kristian Páez (ECU), Carlos Vélez (COL), Carlos Pallares (COL)

4 September 2024
20:00

Boxscore

Argentina	81–42	Chile
Scoring by quarter: 22–3, 17–19, 27–12, 15–8
Pts: D'Urso 17; Rebs: Gauna 10; Asts: Gretter 6		Pts: Ovalle 11; Rebs: Gómez 6 Asts: four players 2

Centro de Deportes Colectivos, Santiago
Referees: Orlando Varela (HON), Nicolás Flores (PAR), Lauren Niemiera (USA)

=== Group B ===
Pos	Team	Pld	W	L	PF	PA	PD	Pts	Qualification
1	Colombia	3	3	0	204	156	+48	6	Semifinals
2	Venezuela	3	2	1	187	167	+20	5	Semifinals
3	Paraguay	3	1	2	176	194	−18	4	5–8th place semifinals
4	Ecuador	3	0	3	158	208	−50	3	5–8th place semifinals

Source: FIBA
Rules for classification: 1) Points; 2) Head-to-head results; 3) Points difference; 4) Points scored.

2 September 2024
12:30

Boxscore

Paraguay	65–57	Ecuador
Scoring by quarter: 15–16, 19–14, 19–15, 12–12
Pts: Ibarra 16; Rebs: Bernal, Britez 10; Asts: Pereira 6		Pts: Salcedo 14; Rebs: Nazareno 6 Asts: Guayaquil 5

Centro de Deportes Colectivos, Santiago
Referees: Aline García (URU), Lauren Niemira (USA), Larissa Sales (BRA)

2 September 2024
15:00

Boxscore

Venezuela	48–63	Colombia
Scoring by quarter: 7–19, 11–9, 13–15, 17–20
Pts: Herlihy 16; Rebs: three players 7 Asts: Wallen 3		Pts: González 16; Rebs: Paz, Vente 10; Asts: Ríos 8

Centro de Deportes Colectivos, Santiago
Referees: Leonardo Zalazar (ARG), Nicolas Zivieri (BRA), Claudio Osorio (CHI)

3 September 2024
12:30

Boxscore

Colombia	62–54	Paraguay
Scoring by quarter: 21–13, 9–16, 21–13, 11–12
Pts: Ríos 15; Rebs: Paz 7 Asts: Ríos 9		Pts: Niz 19; Rebs: Bernal 10; Asts: Niz 4

Centro de Deportes Colectivos, Santiago
Attendance: 100
Referees: Franco Anselmo (ARG), Claudio Osorio (CHI), Nicolas Zivieri (BRA)

3 September 2024
15:00

Boxscore

Ecuador	47–68	Venezuela
Scoring by quarter: 17–22, 7–15, 18–12, 5–15
Pts: Salcedo 12; Rebs: Caicedo 7 Asts: Calderón 6		Pts: Herlihy 18; Rebs: Wallen 10; Asts: Fajardo, Pérez 5

Centro de Deportes Colectivos, Santiago
Attendance: 125
Referees: Julirys Guzmán (PUR), Aline García (URU), Larissa Sales (BRA)

4 September 2024
12:30

Boxscore

Venezuela	75–57	Paraguay
Scoring by quarter: 18–17, 16–10, 22–11, 19–19
Pts: Fajardo 15; Rebs: Herlihy 9 Asts: Pérez 8		Pts: Bernal 14; Rebs: Bernal 10; Asts: Luraghi 3

Centro de Deportes Colectivos, Santiago
Attendance: 156
Referees: Julirys Guzmán (PUR), Nicolas Zivieri (BRA), Claudio Osorio (CHI)

4 September 2024
15:00

Boxscore

Ecuador	54–79	Colombia
Scoring by quarter: 17–25, 9–14, 13–18, 15–22
Pts: Lasso 13; Rebs: Mj. Caicedo 9 Asts: Guayaquil, Valencia 2		Pts: Álvarez 17; Rebs: Paz 12; Asts: Álvarez 4

Centro de Deportes Colectivos, Santiago
Referees: Leonardo Zalazar (ARG), Larissa Sales (BRA), Franco Anselmo (ARG)

== Knockout stage ==
=== Classification round ===
5th–8th classification
Chile	62
Ecuador	44
Paraguay	84
Bolivia	77

Fifth place
Chile	72
Paraguay	65
Seventh place
Ecuador	68
Bolivia	61

==== 5–8th place semifinals ====
6 September 2024
12:30

Boxscore

Paraguay	84–77	Bolivia
Scoring by quarter: 15–27, 22–12, 20–18, 27–20
Pts: Niz 20; Rebs: Bernal 12; Asts: Luraghi, Pereira 5		Pts: Prado 18; Rebs: Herbas 10; Asts: De la Barra 6

Centro de Deportes Colectivos, Santiago
Attendance: 98
Referees: Carlos Vélez (COL), Franco Anselmo (ARG), Larissa Sales (BRA)

6 September 2024
15:00

Boxscore

Chile	62–44	Ecuador
Scoring by quarter: 14–15, 17–9, 12–14, 19–6
Pts: Gómez 15; Rebs: Gómez 10; Asts: Cousiño 5		Pts: Caicedo, Salcedo 12; Rebs: Salcedo 10; Asts: Calderón, Guayaquil 3

Centro de Deportes Colectivos, Santiago
Referees: Leonardo Zalazar (ARG), Nicolás Flores (PAR), Carlos Pallares (COL)

==== Seventh place game ====
7 September 2024
12:30

Boxscore

Ecuador	68–61	Bolivia
Scoring by quarter: 12–15, 17–21, 23–21, 16–4
Pts: Calderón 18; Rebs: Caicedo 9 Asts: Calderón 7		Pts: Coronado 17; Rebs: Fernández 8 Asts: Fernández 7

Centro de Deportes Colectivos, Santiago
Referees: Nicolas Zivieri (BRA), Franco Anselmo (ARG), Carlos Pallares (COL)

==== Fifth place game ====
7 September 2024
15:00

Boxscore

Chile	72–65	Paraguay
Scoring by quarter: 19–12, 12–21, 24–21, 17–21
Pts: Gómez 23; Rebs: Ovalle 11; Asts: Basaez, Cousiño 6		Pts: Niz 12; Rebs: Britez 6 Asts: Niz 5

Centro de Deportes Colectivos, Santiago
Referees: Carlos Vélez (COL), Lauren Niemiera (USA), Larissa Sales (BRA)

=== Final round ===
Semi-finals
Argentina	69
Venezuela	66
Colombia	51
Brazil	91

Final
Argentina	84
Brazil	76
Third place
Venezuela	62
Colombia	68

==== Semifinals ====
6 September 2024
17:30

Boxscore

Colombia	51–91	Brazil
Scoring by quarter: 17–22, 10–23, 11–17, 13–29
Pts: Caicedo 9 Rebs: Muñoz 5 Asts: López 3		Pts: Nicoletti 20; Rebs: Guimarães 8 Asts: Martins 7

Centro de Deportes Colectivos, Santiago
Referees: Carmelo de la Rosa (PUR), Claudio Osorio (CHI), Lauren Niemiera (USA)

6 September 2024
20:00

Boxscore

Argentina	69–66	Venezuela
Scoring by quarter: 19–15, 17–22, 13–14, 20–15
Pts: Chagas 28; Rebs: Gretter 6 Asts: Gretter 8		Pts: Durán 20; Rebs: Herlihy 9 Asts: Durán 5

Centro de Deportes Colectivos, Santiago
Referees: Kristian Páez (ECU), Nicolás Flores (PAR), Aline García (URU)

==== Third place game ====
7 September 2024
17:30

Boxscore

Venezuela	62–68	Colombia
Scoring by quarter: 21–25, 10–21, 11–9, 20–13
Pts: Herlihy 19; Rebs: Herlihy 14; Asts: Pérez 4		Pts: Paz 24; Rebs: González, Paz 9 Asts: Martínez 5

Centro de Deportes Colectivos, Santiago
Attendance: 1,230
Referees: Leonardo Zalazar (ARG), Nicolás Flores (PAR), Carmelo de la Rosa (PUR)

==== Final ====
7 September 2024
20:00

Boxscore

Argentina	84–76	Brazil
Scoring by quarter: 20–29, 24–22, 18–11, 22–14
Pts: Gretter, Siciliano 16; Rebs: Burani 9 Asts: Gretter 6		Pts: De Oliveira 23; Rebs: Gonçalves 8 Asts: Martins 14

Centro de Deportes Colectivos, Santiago
Attendance: 1,354
Referees: Kristian Páez (ECU), Orlando Varela (HON), Julirys Guzmán (PUR)

== Final standings ==
Rank	Team	Record
1st place, gold medalist(s)	Argentina	6–0
2nd place, silver medalist(s)	Brazil	4–2
3rd place, bronze medalist(s)	Colombia	4–1
4	Venezuela	2–3
5	Chile	4–2
6	Paraguay	2–3
7	Ecuador	1–4
8	Bolivia	1–5
9	Uruguay	0–4

Qualified for the 2025 FIBA Women's AmeriCup
Qualified for the 2025 FIBA Women's AmeriCup as host

== Awards ==
The awards were announced on 7 September 2024.

All-Tournament Team
Guards	Forwards
(Argentina) Florencia Chagas (Argentina) Melisa Gretter	(Brazil) Emanuely de Oliveira (Venezuela) Brianna Herlihy (Colombia) Yuliany Paz
MVP: (Argentina) Florencia Chagas
