= 2025 NCAA Women's Basketball All-Americans =

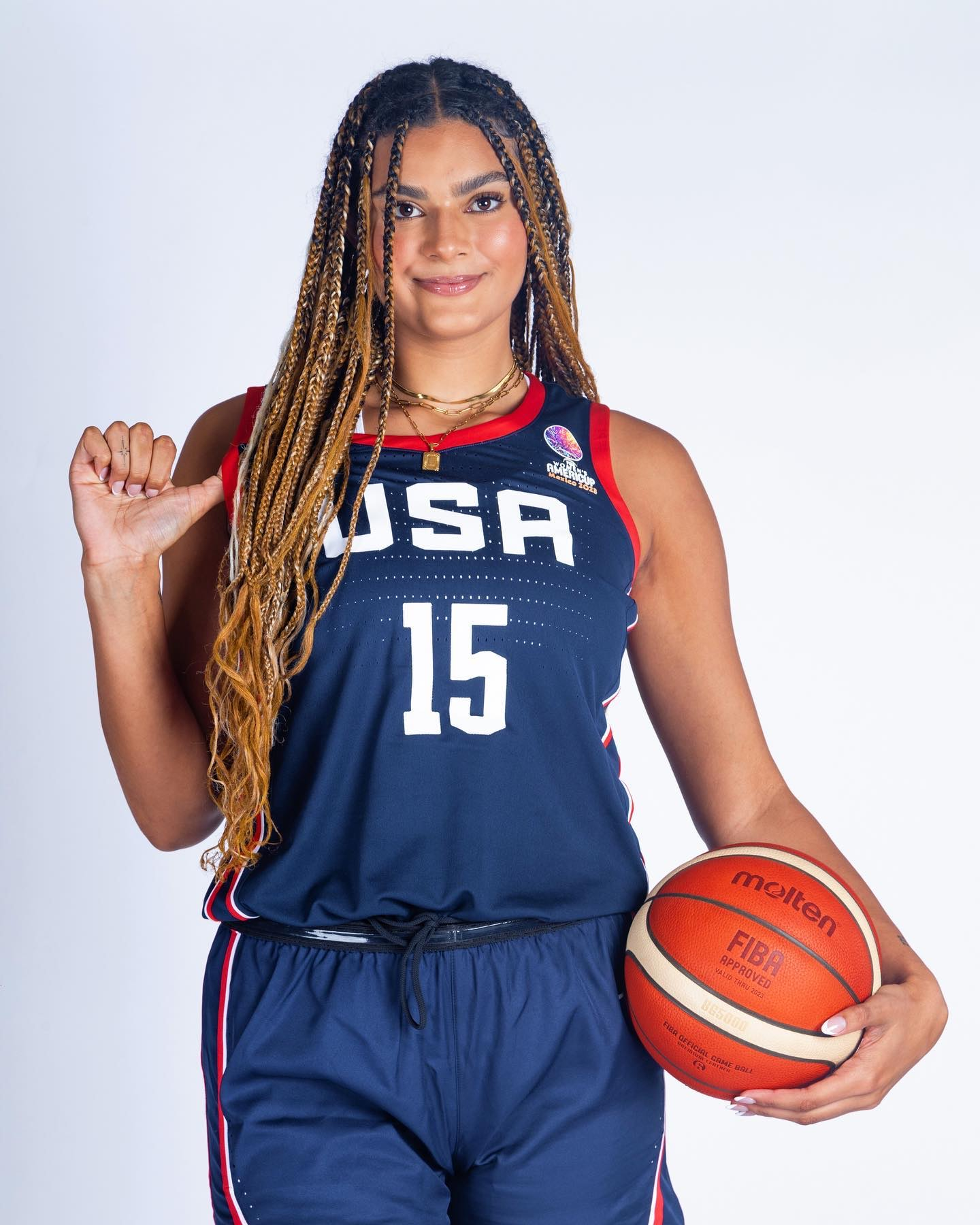
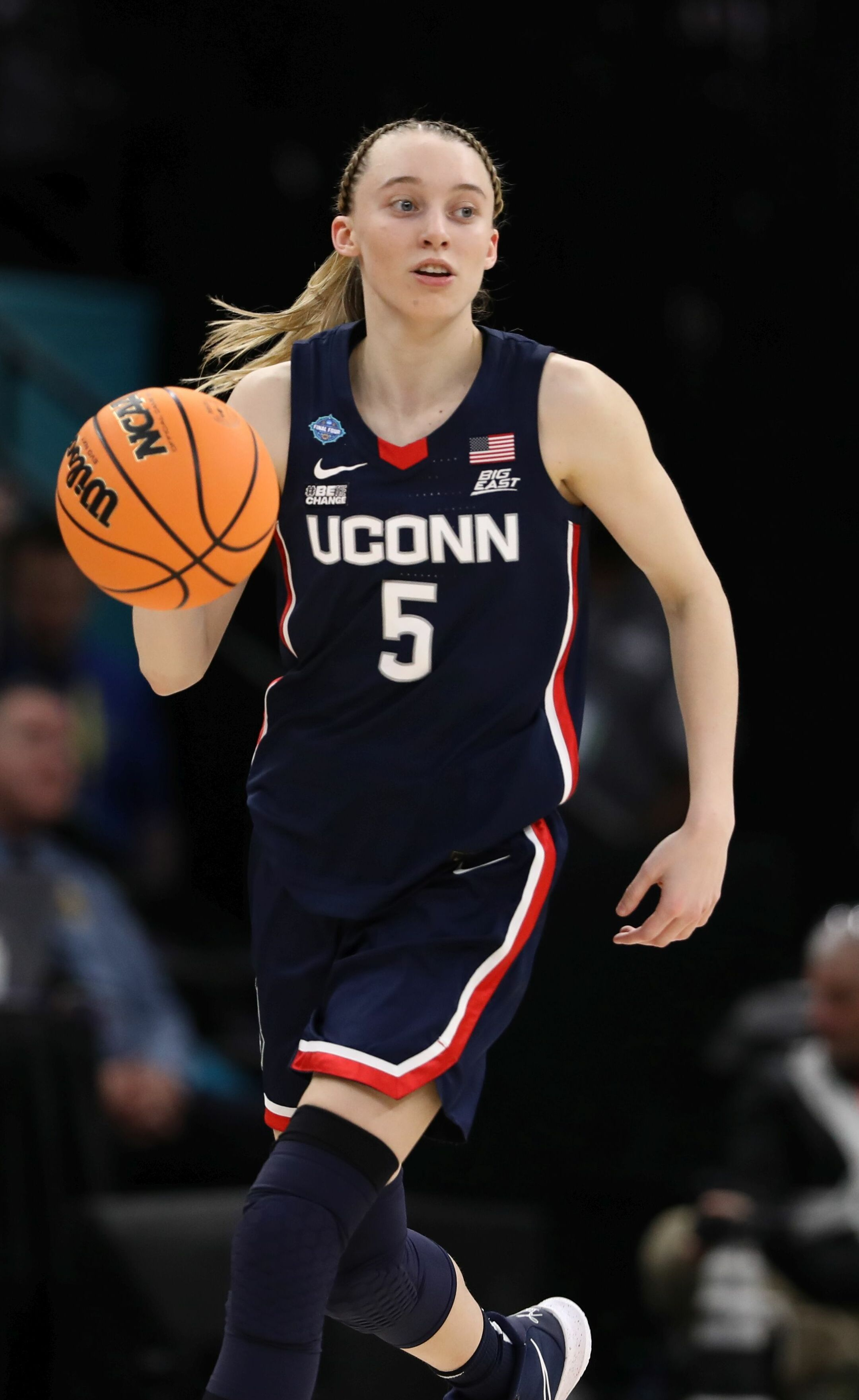
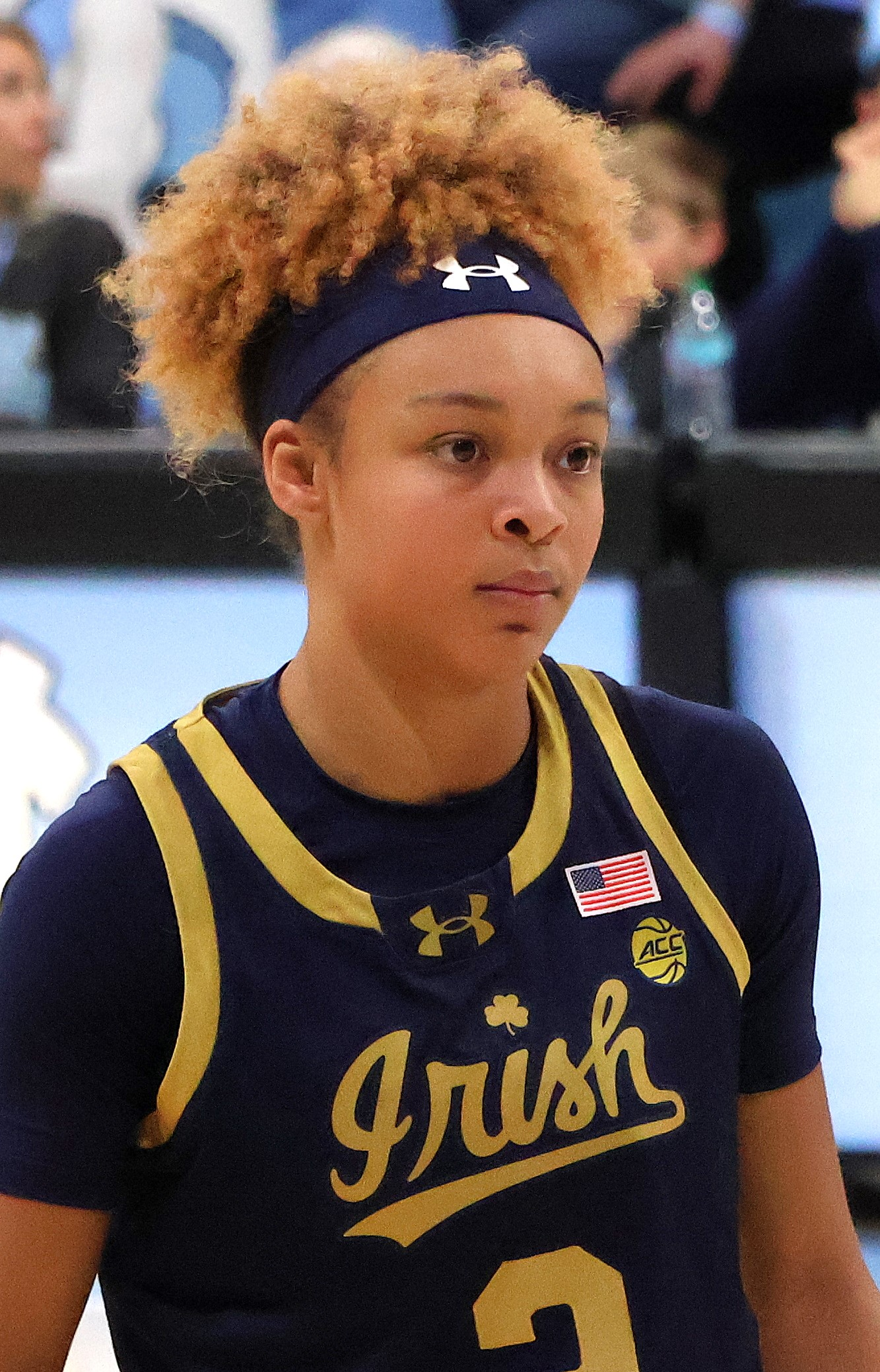
- Members of the 2025 All-America first team (AP, USBWA, ESPN, TSN). Clockwise from upper left: Betts, Bueckers and Hidalgo.
- Awarded for: 2024–25 NCAA Division I women's basketball season

An All-American team is an honorary sports team composed of the best amateur players of a specific season for each team position—who in turn are given the honorific "All-America" and typically referred to as "All-American athletes", or simply "All-Americans". Although the honorees generally do not compete together as a unit, the term is used in U.S. team sports to refer to players who are selected by members of the national media. Walter Camp selected the first All-America team in the early days of American football in 1889. The 2025 NCAA Women's Basketball All-Americans are honorary lists that include All-American selections from the Associated Press (AP), the United States Basketball Writers Association (USBWA), ESPN, The Sporting News (TSN), and the Women's Basketball Coaches Association (WBCA) for the 2024–25 NCAA Division I women's basketball season. The AP and USBWA chose three teams, TSN and ESPN chose two teams, and the WBCA has one list of 10 honorees.

A consensus All-America team in women's basketball has never been organized. This differs from the practice in men's basketball, in which the NCAA uses a combination of selections by AP, USBWA, the National Association of Basketball Coaches (NABC), and Sporting News to determine a consensus All-America team. The selection of a consensus All-America men's basketball team is possible because all four organizations select at least a first and second team, with only the USBWA not selecting a third team.

Before the 2017–18 season, it was impossible for a consensus women's All-America team to be determined because the AP had been the only body that divided its women's selections into separate teams. The USBWA first named separate teams in 2017–18. The women's counterpart to the NABC, the Women's Basketball Coaches Association (WBCA), continues the USBWA's former practice of selecting a single 10-member (plus ties) team. Before the 2023–24 season, Sporting News did not select an All-America team in women's basketball.

== By selector ==
=== Associated Press (AP) ===
Announced on March 19, 2025. The teams are selected by the same 28-member media panel that votes on the AP poll during the season. Of note:

- Paige Bueckers became the twelfth player selected as a three-time first-team All-American.
- Lauren Betts, Bueckers, and Juju Watkins were unanimous first-team selections.

First team		Second team		Third team	
Player	School	Player	School	Player	School
Lauren Betts	UCLA	Georgia Amoore	Kentucky	Mikayla Blakes	Vanderbilt
Madison Booker	Texas	Ta'Niya Latson	Florida State	Audi Crooks	Iowa State
Paige Bueckers	UConn	Olivia Miles	Notre Dame	Kiki Iriafen	USC
Hannah Hidalgo	Notre Dame	Aneesah Morrow	LSU	Flau'jae Johnson	LSU
JuJu Watkins	USC	Sarah Strong	UConn	Hailey Van Lith	TCU

==== AP Honorable Mention ====
Honorable mention selections are those who did not make one of the first three teams, but received at least one vote from the media panel.

- Raegan Beers, Oklahoma
- Sonia Citron, Notre Dame
- Katie Dinnebier, Drake
- Joyce Edwards, South Carolina
- Yvonne Ejim, Gonzaga
- MiLaysia Fulwiley, South Carolina
- Rori Harmon, Texas
- Izzy Higginbottom, Arkansas
- Aziaha James, NC State
- Lauren Jensen, Creighton
- Taylor Jones, Texas
- Chloe Kitts, South Carolina
- Ayoka Lee, Kansas State
- Cotie McMahon, Ohio State
- Te-Hina Paopao, South Carolina
- Sedona Prince, TCU
- JJ Quinerly, West Virginia
- Kiki Rice, UCLA
- Shyanne Sellers, Maryland
- Serena Sundell, Kansas State
- Makayla Timpson, Florida State
- Harmoni Turner, Harvard
- Mikaylah Williams, LSU

=== United States Basketball Writers Association (USBWA) ===
The USBWA announced its 15-member team, divided into first, second, and third teams, plus honorable mention selections, on March 19, 2025.

First team		Second team		Third team	
Player	School	Player	School	Player	School
Lauren Betts	UCLA	Georgia Amoore	Kentucky	Audi Crooks	Iowa State
Paige Bueckers	UConn	Mikayla Blakes	Vanderbilt	Kiki Iriafen	USC
Hannah Hidalgo	Notre Dame	Madison Booker	Texas	Flau'jae Johnson	LSU
Aneesah Morrow	LSU	Ta'Niya Latson	Florida State	Sarah Strong	UConn
JuJu Watkins	USC	Olivia Miles	Notre Dame	Hailey Van Lith	TCU

=== The Sporting News (TSN) ===
The Sporting News announced its 10-member team, divided into first and second teams on March 18, 2025.

First team		Second team	
Player	School	Player	School
Lauren Betts	UCLA	Georgia Amoore	Kentucky
Paige Bueckers	UConn	Mikayla Blakes	Vanderbilt
Hannah Hidalgo	Notre Dame	Madison Booker	Texas
Aneesah Morrow	LSU	Ta'Niya Latson	Florida State
JuJu Watkins	USC	Olivia Miles	Notre Dame

=== ESPN ===
ESPN.com was the first to announce its 10-member team, divided into first and second teams on March 13, 2025.

First team		Second team	
Player	School	Player	School
Lauren Betts	UCLA	Mikayla Blakes	Vanderbilt
Paige Bueckers	UConn	Madison Booker	Texas
Hannah Hidalgo	Notre Dame	Ta'Niya Latson	Florida State
Aneesah Morrow	LSU	Olivia Miles	Notre Dame
JuJu Watkins	USC	Sarah Strong	UConn

=== Women's Basketball Coaches Association (WBCA) ===
Announced on April 3, 2025.

Player	School
Georgia Amoore	Kentucky
Lauren Betts	UCLA
Madison Booker	Texas
Paige Bueckers	UConn
Hannah Hidalgo	Notre Dame
Kiki Iriafen	USC
Aneesah Morrow	LSU
Sarah Strong	UConn
Hailey Van Lith	TCU
JuJu Watkins	USC

== Academic All-Americans ==
College Sports Communicators announced its 2025 Academic All-America teams for all NCAA divisions and the NAIA on April 16, 2025. The Division I Academic All-American of the Year is indicated in bold.

First Team
Player	School	Class	GPA and major
Sarah Ashlee Barker	Alabama	Graduate	3.63 (UG)/3.75 (G), sports management
Raegan Beers	Oklahoma	Sophomore	3.51, multidisciplinary studies
Katie Dinnebier	Drake	Senior	3.74, pharmacy
**Kiki Iriafen**	USC	Senior	3.52 (UG)/3.54 (G), entrepreneurship & innovation
Peyton McDaniel	James Madison	Junior (redshirt)	3.96 (UG)/4.00 (G), adult education & human resource development
Kiki Rice	UCLA	Junior	3.85, education

Second Team
Player	School	Class	GPA and major
Kelsey Rees	Oregon State	Graduate	3.97 (UG)/3.93 (G), bioengineering
Morgan Maly	Creighton	Senior	3.93, exercise science
Lauren Ross	Purdue Fort Wayne	Graduate	4.00 (UG)/4.00 (G), organizational leadership
Serena Sundell	Kansas State	Senior	3.84 (UG)/3.83 (G), business administration
Haleigh Timmer	South Dakota State	Junior	4.00, mathematics (data science specialization)

Third Team
Player	School	Class	GPA and major
Yvonne Ejim	Gonzaga	Senior	3.60, human physiology
Emily Ryan	Iowa State	Senior	3.56, kinesiology & health
Addy Brown	Iowa State	Sophomore	3.79, business management
Amaya Battle	Minnesota	Junior	3.73, sociology
