= Crestwood Preparatory College =

Private High School in Toronto, Ontario, Canada

Crestwood Preparatory College (Crestwood Preparatory Collegiate)

Location
- 217 Brookbanks Drive; Toronto, Ontario, M3A 2T7; Canada; 43.7592°N 79.3249°W

Information
- School type: Private; Independent; day; college-preparatory school
- Religious affiliation: Nonsectarian
- Founded: 2001
- School board: CIS (leased to the Toronto District School Board)
- Principal: Dave Hecock
- Grades: K–12
- Gender: Co-ed
- Enrollment: 500+ (2023)
- Language: English
- Colours: Blue and silver
- Athletics conference: CISAA
- Mascot: The Lion
- Team name: Lions
- Tuition: K–12: $26,250–$36,950; International students: $40,500
- Website: www.crestwood.on.ca

Crestwood Preparatory College is a co-ed, private, non-semestered high school in Toronto, Ontario.

== History ==
Crestwood initially began in 1980. In September 2001, Crestwood Preparatory College opened at its current site.

== Sports ==
Crestwood Preparatory College is well known for its academic sports program. Crestwood's primary sport they are known for is basketball, although they have many other ones, such as hockey, swimming, soccer, curling, and badminton. Crestwood participates in CISAA.

| Sport name | Group |
|---|---|
| Basketball | U14 girls' basketball |
| Basketball | Junior girls' basketball |
| Basketball | Senior girls' basketball |
| Basketball | U14 boys' basketball |
| Basketball | Junior boys' basketball |
| Basketball | Senior boys' basketball |
| Cross country running | U14 cross country running |
| Cross country running | Varsity cross-country running |
| Soccer | U14 boys' soccer |
| Soccer | Junior boys' soccer |
| Soccer | Senior boys' soccer |
| Volleyball | U14 boys' volleyball |
| Volleyball | Junior boys' volleyball |
| Volleyball | Senior boys' volleyball |
| Volleyball | Junior girls' volleyball |
| Volleyball | Senior girls' volleyball |
| Frisbee | U14 ultimate frisbee |
| Frisbee | Varsity ultimate frisbee |
| Hockey | U14 hockey |
| Hockey | Senior boys' hockey |
| Curling | Open division |
| Curling | U14 boys' Curling |
| Curling | Varsity boys' curling |
| Curling | Varsity girls' curling |
| Swimming | U14 swimming |
| Swimming | Varsity swimming |
| Rugby | U14 boys' rugby |
| Rugby | Junior boys' rugby |
| Rugby | Senior boys' rugby |
| Softball | U14 boys' softball |
| Softball | Varsity boys' softball |
| Softball | Varsity girls' softball |
| Track and field | U14 track and field |
| Track and field | Varsity track & field |

== Notable alumni ==
- Emmanuel Zambazis (2015), soccer player
- Franco Miller Jr. (2018), basketball player
- Aaliyah Edwards (2020), WNBA player, Olympian
- Shayeann Day-Wilson (2021), college basketball player
- Elijah Fisher (2022), basketball player for Pacific Tigers
- Adam Pearlman (2023), soccer player
- Toby Fournier (2024), basketball player for the Duke Blue Devils

== See also ==
- Education in Ontario
- List of secondary schools in Ontario
