= 2025 FIBA Women's AmeriCup =

Basketball tournament

Tournament details
- Host country: Chile
- City: Santiago
- Dates: 28 June – 6 July
- Teams: 10 (from 1 confederation)
- Venue: 1 (in 1 host city)

Final positions
- Champions: United States (5th title)
- Runners-up: Brazil
- Third place: Canada
- Fourth place: Argentina

Tournament statistics
- Games played: 32
- Attendance: 18,399 (575 per game)
- MVP: (United States) Mikayla Blakes
- Top scorer: (Brazil) Damiris Dantas (21.4 ppg)

Official website
- www.fiba.basketball

The 2025 FIBA Women's AmeriCup was the 18th edition of the FIBA Women's AmeriCup, which is the main tournament for senior women's basketball national teams of the FIBA Americas. It was held from 28 June to 6 July 2025 in Santiago, Chile.

The winner qualified for the 2026 FIBA Women's Basketball World Cup and the top six teams (including the winner) will qualify for one of the qualifying tournaments for the 2026 World Cup.

The United States won its fifth title and qualified for the 2026 FIBA Women's Basketball World Cup, after defeating Brazil 92–84 in the finals. Alongside the US, Brazil, Canada, Argentina, Colombia and Puerto Rico qualified for the qualifying tournaments for the World Cup.

== Host selection ==
On 22 May 2024, two weeks after receiving the 2024 South American Women's Championship, Chile was awarded the hosting rights for the 2025 FIBA Women's AmeriCup. This will be Chile's second time hosting the event after 2007 in Valdivia.

== Qualification ==
Map of qualifiers for the 2025 FIBA Women's AmeriCup: Team qualified for 2025 FIBA Women's AmeriCup Team failed to qualify Did not enter

Qualifying took place between August and November 2024, consisting of two tournaments: the 2024 South American Championship for South American teams and the 2024 Centrobasket for teams from Central America and the Caribbean. In total, 17 countries took part in both competitions. Canada and United States were given automatic tickets to the tournament.

Overall, eight of the ten teams that participated in 2023 are present. As hosts, Chile qualified for the first time since 2015, while El Salvador qualified for their second appearance after missing out on 2023. Dominican Republic qualified for their fourth consecutive time for the first time ever. Cuba and Venezuela miss out having taken part in 2023.

Qualification	Host	Dates	Vacancies	Qualified
Host	(United States) Miami	22 May 2024	1	Chile
Automatic entry			2	Canada; United States
2024 South American Championship	(Chile) Santiago	31 August – 7 September 2024	3	Argentina; Brazil; Colombia
2024 Centrobasket Women	(Mexico) Irapuato	5–10 November 2024	4	Dominican Republic; El Salvador; Mexico; Puerto Rico

=== Summary of qualified teams ===
Team	Qualification method	Date of qualification	Appearance(s)				Previous best performance (Note: Bold text indicates they hosted that edition.)	WR (Note: World ranking at start of tournament.)
Team	Qualification method	Date of qualification	Total	First	Last	Streak	Previous best performance	WR
Chile	Host nation	22 May 2024	10th	1993	2015	1	Fifth place (1995, 2001)	70
Canada	Automatic entry	22 May 2024	18th	1989	2023	18	Champions (1995, 2015, 2017)	7
United States	Automatic entry	22 May 2024	8th	1989	2023	4	Champions (1993, 2007, 2019, 2021)	1
Brazil	Top three at 2024 South American Championship	6 September 2024	17th	1989	2023	15	Champions (Six times) (Note: Brazil have won in 1997, 2001, 2003, 2009, 2011 and 2023.)	10
Argentina	Top three at 2024 South American Championship	6 September 2024	18th	1989	2023	18	Runners-up (2009, 2011, 2017)	31
Colombia	Top three at 2024 South American Championship	7 September 2024	7th	1997	2023	5	Fifth place (2019, 2021, 2023)	30
Puerto Rico	Top four at 2024 Centrobasket Women	6 November 2024	14th	1993	2023	9	Runners-up (2021)	12
Dominican Republic	Top four at 2024 Centrobasket Women	6 November 2024	12th	1989	2023	4	Sixth place (1989, 1999, 2005)	34
Mexico	Top four at 2024 Centrobasket Women	6 November 2024	12th	1989	2023	2	Fourth place (1999)	38
El Salvador	Top four at 2024 Centrobasket Women	7 November 2024	2nd	2021		1	Ninth place (2021)	56

== Format ==
The ten teams were split into two groups of five teams. The top four teams per group qualified to the quarterfinals. A first-placed team faced off against the fourth-placed team and a second-placed team battled against a third-placed team of the other group. A knockout-system was used after the preliminary round.

== Venue ==
The venue for the entire competition was the Centro de Deportes Colectivos in Chile's capital, Santiago. It is located in the National Sports Park, built for the 2023 Pan American Games. The venue inaugurated in 2023 and hosted Gymnastics at the 2023 Pan American Games and Wheelchair rugby at the 2023 Parapan American Games.

2025 FIBA Women's AmeriCup is located in Chile	Santiago
2025 FIBA Women's AmeriCup is located in Chile	Centro de Deportes Colectivos
2025 FIBA Women's AmeriCup is located in Chile	Capacity: 2,400

== Final draw ==
The final draw took place at 17:00 ET on 26 March 2025 at the FIBA Americas headquarters in Miami, United States. The guests for the draw were former players Carla Cortijo, Iziane Castro, and Sylvia Fowles. The draw started with, in order, pots 1, 2, 3, 4 and 5 being drawn, with each team selected then allocated into the first available group alphabetically. The position for the team within the group would then be drawn (for the purpose of the schedule). Before the draw, hosts Chile had been pre-determined to be placed into position B4.

=== Seeding ===
The seeding was revealed on 7 March 2025. The seeding was based on the FIBA Women's World Ranking as of 14 February 2025.

Pot 1
Team	Pos
El Salvador	56
Chile (hosts)	70

Pot 2
Team	Pos
United States	1
Canada	7

Pot 3
Team	Pos
Brazil	10
Puerto Rico	12

Pot 4
Team	Pos
Colombia	30
Argentina	31

Pot 5
Team	Pos
Dominican Republic	34
Mexico	38

=== Draw ===
Group A
Pos	Team
A1	Dominican Republic
A2	Argentina
A3	Canada
A4	El Salvador
A5	Brazil

Group B
Pos	Team
B1	Mexico
B2	Colombia
B3	United States
B4	Chile
B5	Puerto Rico

== Referees ==
The following 17 referees were selected for the tournament.

- (Argentina) Franco Anselmo
- (Argentina) Juan Fernández
- (Brazil) Diego Chiconato
- (Brazil) Larissa Sales
- (Canada) Xiang Fei
- (Chile) Claudio Osorio
- (Colombia) Yezid Carreño
- (Costa Rica) Roberto Fernández
- (Dominican Republic) Samuel Hidalgo
- (Mexico) Krishna Domínguez
- (Mexico) Samuel Hidalgo
- (Puerto Rico) Carmelo de la Rosa
- (Puerto Rico) Julirys Guzmán
- (United States) Lauren Niemiera
- (Uruguay) Andrés Bartel
- (Uruguay) Gvidas Gedvilas
- (Venezuela) Daniel García

== Squads ==
Each nation had to submit a list of 12 players.

== Preliminary round ==
All times are local (UTC−4).

=== Group A ===
Pos	Team	Pld	W	L	PF	PA	PD	Pts	Qualification
1	Brazil	4	4	0	324	210	+114	8	Quarterfinals
2	Canada	4	3	1	318	202	+116	7	Quarterfinals
3	Argentina	4	2	2	241	250	−9	6	Quarterfinals
4	Dominican Republic	4	1	3	204	281	−77	5	Quarterfinals
5	El Salvador	4	0	4	199	343	−144	4	

Source: FIBA
Rules for classification: 1) Points; 2) Head-to-head results; 3) Points difference; 4) Points scored.

28 June 2025
11:40

Boxscore

El Salvador	34–100	Canada
Scoring by quarter: 9–26, 16–32, 5–18, 4–24
Pts: Escobar, Villalobos 8 Rebs: Villalobos 6 Asts: four players 1		Pts: Wallack 11; Rebs: Ejim 12; Asts: Colley 8

Centro de Deportes Colectivos, Santiago
Attendance: 884
Referees: Krishna Domínguez (MEX), Roberto Fernández (CRC), Claudio Osorio (CHI)

28 June 2025
14:10

Boxscore

Argentina	50–71	Brazil
Scoring by quarter: 4–22, 21–18, 16–8, 9–23
Pts: Siciliano 12; Rebs: Gretter 7 Asts: Gretter 4		Pts: Dantas 24; Rebs: Cardoso 11; Asts: Cardoso, Nascimento 4

Centro de Deportes Colectivos, Santiago
Attendance: 884
Referees: Andrés Bartel (URU), Julirys Guzmán (PUR), Lauren Niemiera (USA)

29 June 2025
11:40

Boxscore

Dominican Republic	61–59	El Salvador
Scoring by quarter: 8–12, 17–17, 17–18, 19–12
Pts: Capellan 24; Rebs: Capellan, De Los Santos 10; Asts: Capellan, Evangelista 3		Pts: Martínez 22; Rebs: Villalobos 13; Asts: Martínez 5

Centro de Deportes Colectivos, Santiago
Attendance: 586
Referees: Lauren Niemiera (USA), Carmelo de la Rosa (PUR), Yezid Carreño (COL)

29 June 2025
14:10

Boxscore

Canada	71–48	Argentina
Scoring by quarter: 20–12, 15–8, 23–14, 13–14
Pts: Day-Wilson 18; Rebs: Ejim 12; Asts: Day-Wilson, Swords 4		Pts: Boquete 12; Rebs: Gentinetta 6 Asts: Gretter 6

Centro de Deportes Colectivos, Santiago
Attendance: 586
Referees: Julirys Guzmán (PUR), Krishna Domínguez (MEX), Claudio Osorio (CHI)

30 June 2025
11:40

Boxscore

Argentina	67–51	Dominican Republic
Scoring by quarter: 20–9, 18–11, 18–18, 11–13
Pts: Chagas 23; Rebs: Cabrera 15; Asts: Gretter 4		Pts: Capellan 17; Rebs: Hodge, Reynoso 6 Asts: Quéliz 2

Centro de Deportes Colectivos, Santiago
Attendance: 475
Referees: Andrés Bartel (URU), Krishna Domínguez (MEX), Yezid Carreño (COL)

30 June 2025
14:10

Boxscore

Brazil	74–65	Canada
Scoring by quarter: 20–17, 14–21, 25–22, 15–5
Pts: Dantas 20; Rebs: Dantas 14; Asts: three players 4		Pts: Day-Wilson 14; Rebs: Alexander 12; Asts: Day-Wilson 5

Centro de Deportes Colectivos, Santiago
Attendance: 475
Referees: Carmelo de la Rosa (PUR), Lauren Niemiera (USA), Julirys Guzmán (PUR)

1 July 2025
11:40

Boxscore

Dominican Republic	46–73	Brazil
Scoring by quarter: 5–31, 13–15, 18–20, 10–7
Pts: Morton 14; Rebs: De Los Santos 8 Asts: three players 2		Pts: Nascimento 14; Rebs: Silva 8 Asts: Nascimento 7

Centro de Deportes Colectivos, Santiago
Attendance: 301
Referees: Aline García (URU), Claudio Osorio (CHI), Julirys Guzmán (PUR)

1 July 2025
14:10

Boxscore

El Salvador	57–76	Argentina
Scoring by quarter: 14–16, 14–22, 18–15, 11–23
Pts: Martínez 18; Rebs: Villalobos 13; Asts: Villalobos 5		Pts: Cabrera 14; Rebs: Cabrera 15; Asts: Gretter 8

Centro de Deportes Colectivos, Santiago
Attendance: 301
Referees: Carmelo de la Rosa (PUR), Yezid Carreño (COL), Roberto Fernández (CRC)

2 July 2025
11:40

Boxscore

Brazil	106–49	El Salvador
Scoring by quarter: 24–10, 24–15, 31–14, 27–10
Pts: Dantas 21; Rebs: Silva 11; Asts: Marcelino, Martins 6		Pts: Harvey-Carr 15; Rebs: Tévez 9 Asts: Martínez 4

Centro de Deportes Colectivos, Santiago
Attendance: 736
Referees: Julirys Guzmán (PUR), Yezid Carreño (COL), Krishna Domínguez (MEX)

2 July 2025
17:40

Boxscore

Canada	82–46	Dominican Republic
Scoring by quarter: 23–9, 24–10, 12–14, 23–13
Pts: Gibb 21; Rebs: Alexander 11; Asts: Day-Wilson 8		Pts: Capellan 17; Rebs: Capella, Reynoso 6 Asts: three players 2

Centro de Deportes Colectivos, Santiago
Attendance: 1,833
Referees: Lauren Niemiera (USA), Aline García (URU), Claudio Osorio (CHI)

=== Group B ===
Pos	Team	Pld	W	L	PF	PA	PD	Pts	Qualification
1	United States	4	4	0	372	200	+172	8	Quarterfinals
2	Puerto Rico	4	3	1	282	243	+39	7	Quarterfinals
3	Colombia	4	2	2	238	241	−3	6	Quarterfinals
4	Mexico	4	1	3	244	311	−67	5	Quarterfinals
5	Chile (H)	4	0	4	177	318	−141	4	

Source: FIBA
Rules for classification: 1) Points; 2) Head-to-head results; 3) Points difference; 4) Points scored.
(H) Hosts

28 June 2025
17:40

Boxscore

Colombia	65–68	Puerto Rico
Scoring by quarter: 20–20, 22–16, 8–15, 15–17
Pts: Muñoz 23; Rebs: Paz 11; Asts: González, Ríos 3		Pts: Guirantes 15; Rebs: Hollingshed 7 Asts: Vélez 3

Centro de Deportes Colectivos, Santiago
Attendance: 2,333
Referees: Daniel García (VEN), Xiang Fei (CAN), Diego Chiconato (BRA)

28 June 2025
20:10

Boxscore

Chile	47–108	United States
Scoring by quarter: 14–19, 9–27, 22–33, 2–29
Pts: Ojeda 11; Rebs: three players 4 Asts: Campos 4		Pts: Beers 22; Rebs: Beers 7 Asts: Miles 7

Centro de Deportes Colectivos, Santiago
Attendance: 2,333
Referees: Juan Fernández (ARG), Aline García (URU), Larissa Sales (BRA)

29 June 2025
17:40

Boxscore

Mexico	76–59	Chile
Scoring by quarter: 12–15, 27–17, 15–13, 22–14
Pts: Valenzuela 24; Rebs: Jeffreis 7 Asts: Lara, Ramírez 4		Pts: Ljubetic 24; Rebs: Cousiño 8 Asts: Cousiño 4

Centro de Deportes Colectivos, Santiago
Attendance: 2,307
Referees: Diego Chiconato (BRA), Franco Anselmo (ARG), Samuel Hidalgo (MEX)

29 June 2025
20:10

Boxscore

United States	80–43	Colombia
Scoring by quarter: 25–10, 23–9, 15–13, 17–11
Pts: Blakes 15; Rebs: Beers 10; Asts: Miles 8		Pts: López 10; Rebs: Vente 6 Asts: Ríos 2

Centro de Deportes Colectivos, Santiago
Attendance: 2,307
Referees: Xiang Fei (CAN), Larissa Sales (BRA), Aline García (URU)

30 June 2025
17:40

Boxscore

Colombia	71–60	Mexico
Scoring by quarter: 22–6, 20–15, 13–16, 16–23
Pts: Ríos 12; Rebs: Paz 8 Asts: Muñoz 5		Pts: Jeffreis, Ramírez 15; Rebs: Jeffreis 11; Asts: Ramírez 3

Centro de Deportes Colectivos, Santiago
Attendance: 497
Referees: Juan Fernández (ARG), Xiang Fei (CAN), Franco Anselmo (ARG)

30 June 2025
20:10

Boxscore

Puerto Rico	62–80	United States
Scoring by quarter: 15–20, 19–15, 8–25, 20–20
Pts: San Antonio 12; Rebs: Jones 6 Asts: Guirantes 4		Pts: Kneepkens 14; Rebs: Miles, VanSlooten 7 Asts: Miles 8

Centro de Deportes Colectivos, Santiago
Attendance: 497
Referees: Daniel García (VEN), Diego Chiconato (BRA), Roberto Fernández (CRC)

1 July 2025
17:40

Boxscore

Mexico	60–77	Puerto Rico
Scoring by quarter: 14–32, 16–16, 12–10, 18–19
Pts: Jaquez 15; Rebs: Ramos, Valenzuela 8 Asts: Ramos 4		Pts: Guirantes 31; Rebs: Guirantes 12; Asts: Rosado 7

Centro de Deportes Colectivos, Santiago
Attendance: 2,147
Referees: Andrés Bartel (URU), Samuel Hidalgo (MEX), Xiang Fei (CAN)

1 July 2025
20:10

Boxscore

Chile	33–59	Colombia
Scoring by quarter: 12–16, 7–15, 7–12, 7–16
Pts: Pérez 9 Rebs: Cárdenas 7 Asts: Campos, Pérez 2		Pts: Muñoz 12; Rebs: Paz 10; Asts: three players 3

Centro de Deportes Colectivos, Santiago
Attendance: 2,147
Referees: Daniel García (VEN), Franco Anselmo (ARG), Larissa Sales (BRA)

2 July 2025
14:10

Boxscore

United States	104–48	Mexico
Scoring by quarter: 21–10, 22–14, 36–16, 25–8
Pts: Kneepkens 20; Rebs: three players 6 Asts: Miles 10		Pts: Jeffreis 14; Rebs: Jeffreis 6 Asts: Jeffreis 3

Centro de Deportes Colectivos, Santiago
Attendance: 736
Referees: Xiang Fei (CAN), Larissa Sales (BRA), Franco Anselmo (ARG)

2 July 2025
20:10

Boxscore

Puerto Rico	75–38	Chile
Scoring by quarter: 25–16, 20–8, 17–6, 13–8
Pts: Pagán 18; Rebs: Benítez 8 Asts: three players 5		Pts: Cousiño 18; Rebs: Cárdenas 13; Asts: Campos, Cousiño 3

Centro de Deportes Colectivos, Santiago
Attendance: 1,833
Referees: Juan Fernández (ARG), Diego Chiconato (BRA), Roberto Fernández (CRC)

== Knockout stage ==
=== Bracket ===
Quarter-finals
4 July
Brazil	84
Mexico	61
4 July
Puerto Rico	51
Argentina	53
4 July
United States	110
Dominican Republic	44
4 July
Canada	73
Colombia	49

Semi-finals
5 July
Brazil	108
Argentina	68
5 July
United States	65
Canada	53

Final
6 July
Brazil	84
United States	92
Third place game
6 July
Argentina	75
Canada (2OT)	76

5–8th place bracket

5–8th place semifinals
5 July
Mexico	67
Puerto Rico	72
5 July
Dominican Republic	53
Colombia	81

Fifth place game
6 July
Puerto Rico	65
Colombia	76
Seventh place game
6 July
Mexico	84
Dominican Republic	54

=== Quarter-finals ===
4 July 2025
11:40

Boxscore

United States	110–44	Dominican Republic
Scoring by quarter: 28–11, 27–10, 30–13, 25–10
Pts: Johnson 22; Rebs: Beers 10; Asts: Hidalgo 9		Pts: Hodge 12; Rebs: Hodge 6 Asts: Jiménez 5

Centro de Deportes Colectivos, Santiago
Attendance: 450
Referees: Krishna Domínguez (MEX), Roberto Fernández (CRC), Larissa Sales (BRA)

4 July 2025
14:10

Boxscore

Canada	73–49	Colombia
Scoring by quarter: 13–6, 24–10, 21–12, 15–21
Pts: Colley, Ejim 12; Rebs: K. Alexander 9 Asts: three players 3		Pts: Delgado 14; Rebs: Y. Paz 6 Asts: C. López, Vente 4

Centro de Deportes Colectivos, Santiago
Attendance: 450
Referees: Juan Fernández (ARG), Diego Chiconato (BRA), Claudio Osorio (CHI)

4 July 2025
17:40

Boxscore

Brazil	84–61	Mexico
Scoring by quarter: 16–9, 20–21, 18–15, 30–16
Pts: Dantas 24; Rebs: Cardoso 16; Asts: Dantas, De Oliveira 4		Pts: Jaquez 15; Rebs: Jaquez 8 Asts: four players 2

Centro de Deportes Colectivos, Santiago
Attendance: 709
Referees: Aline García (URU), Yezid Carreño (COL), Samuel Hidalgo (MEX)

4 July 2025
20:10

Boxscore

Puerto Rico	51–53	Argentina
Scoring by quarter: 14–11, 11–13, 10–13, 16–16
Pts: Guirantes 16; Rebs: Hollingshed, Pagán 8 Asts: Hollingshed 3		Pts: Gretter 15; Rebs: Burani 9 Asts: Gretter 7

Centro de Deportes Colectivos, Santiago
Attendance: 709
Referees: Andrés Bartel (URU), Daniel García (VEN), Xiang Fei (CAN)

=== 5–8th classification ===
5 July 2025
11:40

Boxscore

Dominican Republic	53–81	Colombia
Scoring by quarter: 17–20, 11–25, 12–17, 13–18
Pts: Capellan 16; Rebs: Reynoso 8 Asts: Capellan 3		Pts: Paz 20; Rebs: Paz 13; Asts: three players 5

Centro de Deportes Colectivos, Santiago
Attendance: 400
Referees: Julirys Guzmán (PUR), Lauren Niemiera (USA), Larissa Sales (BRA)

5 July 2025
14:10

Boxscore

Mexico	67–72	Puerto Rico
Scoring by quarter: 22–15, 13–17, 21–18, 11–22
Pts: Valenzuela 22; Rebs: Lara 9 Asts: Ramírez 5		Pts: San Antonio 17; Rebs: three players 5 Asts: San Antonio 6

Centro de Deportes Colectivos, Santiago
Attendance: 400
Referees: Andrés Bartel (URU), Diego Chiconato (BRA), Claudio Osorio (CHI)

=== Semi-finals ===
5 July 2025
17:40

Boxscore

United States	65–53	Canada
Scoring by quarter: 12–14, 19–19, 20–15, 14–5
Pts: Hidalgo 19; Rebs: four players 5 Asts: Hidalgo 4		Pts: Alexander 10; Rebs: Alexander 13; Asts: Swords 4

Centro de Deportes Colectivos, Santiago
Attendance: 1,915
Referees: Krishna Domínguez (MEX), Aline García (URU), Yezid Carreño (COL)

5 July 2025
20:10

Boxscore

Brazil	108–68	Argentina
Scoring by quarter: 33–22, 26–14, 28–17, 21–15
Pts: Nascimento 22; Rebs: Silva 9 Asts: Martins 9		Pts: Gretter 15; Rebs: Gentinetta 6 Asts: Cabrera, Siciliano 3

Centro de Deportes Colectivos, Santiago
Attendance: 1,915
Referees: Daniel García (VEN), Roberto Fernández (CRC), Samuel Hidalgo (DOM)

=== Seventh place game ===
6 July 2025
11:40

Boxscore

Mexico	84–54	Dominican Republic
Scoring by quarter: 21–12, 29–12, 17–14, 17–16
Pts: Valenzuela 16; Rebs: Valenzuela 17; Asts: Ramírez 6		Pts: Capellan 15; Rebs: Reynoso 9 Asts: Abreu, Quéliz 3

Centro de Deportes Colectivos, Santiago
Attendance: 638
Referees: Aline García (URU), Yezid Carreño (COL), Franco Anselmo (ARG)

=== Fifth place game ===
6 July 2025
14:10

Boxscore

Puerto Rico	65–76	Colombia
Scoring by quarter: 16–18, 18–27, 13–15, 18–16
Pts: Rosado 17; Rebs: Rosado 9 Asts: Rosado 7		Pts: Paz 18; Rebs: Martínez 10; Asts: Ríos 10

Centro de Deportes Colectivos, Santiago
Attendance: 638
Referees: Daniel García (VEN), Diego Chiconato (BRA), Krishna Domínguez (MEX)

=== Third place game ===
6 July 2025
17:40

Boxscore

Argentina	75–76 (OT)	Canada
Scoring by quarter: 16–19, 18–12, 8–16, 17–12, Overtime: 8–8, 8–9
Pts: D'Urso 22; Rebs: Cabrera 12; Asts: Gretter 5		Pts: Swords 23; Rebs: Ejim 16; Asts: Day-Wilson, Gibb 4

Centro de Deportes Colectivos, Santiago
Attendance: 2,188
Referees: Carmelo de la Rosa (PUR), Lauren Niemiera (USA), Julirys Guzmán (PUR)

=== Final ===
6 July 2025
20:10

Boxscore

Brazil	84–92	United States
Scoring by quarter: 22–25, 25–20, 19–20, 18–27
Pts: Dantas 35; Rebs: Dantas 8 Asts: Dantas 4		Pts: Blakes 27; Rebs: three players 7 Asts: Miles 9

Centro de Deportes Colectivos, Santiago
Attendance: 2,188
Referees: Andrés Bartel (URU), Juan Fernández (ARG), Xiang Fei (CAN)

== Final standings ==
Rank	Team	Record
1st place, gold medalist(s)	United States	7–0
2nd place, silver medalist(s)	Brazil	6–1
3rd place, bronze medalist(s)	Canada	5–2
4	Argentina	3–4
5	Colombia	3–3
6	Puerto Rico	3–3
7	Mexico	2–4
8	Dominican Republic	1–5
9	Chile	0–4
10	El Salvador	0–4

Qualified for the 2026 FIBA Women's Basketball World Cup
Qualified for the 2026 FIBA Women's Basketball World Cup Qualifying Tournaments

== Statistics and awards ==
=== Statistical leaders ===
==== Players ====
Points

Name	PPG
(Brazil) Damiris Dantas	21.4
(Puerto Rico) Arella Guirantes	17.0
(Dominican Republic) Cesarina Capellan	15.1
(Brazil) Bella Nascimento	15.0
(Brazil) Kamilla Cardoso	14.9

Rebounds

Name	RPG
(Canada) Yvonne Ejim	9.9
(Brazil) Kamilla Cardoso	9.9
(Canada) Kayla Alexander	9.6
(El Salvador) Kimberly Villalobos	9.3
(Colombia) Yuliany Paz	8.6

Assists

Name	APG
(United States) Olivia Miles	7.1
(Argentina) Melisa Gretter	5.1
(Brazil) Cacá Martins	4.6
(United States) Hannah Hidalgo	4.6
(Canada) Shayeann Day-Wilson	4.3

Blocks

Name	BPG
(Brazil) Kamilla Cardoso	2.0
(Canada) Kayla Alexander	1.9
(Colombia) Yuliany Paz	1.6
(Chile) Constanza Cardenas	1.3
(Dominican Republic) Madelyn Batista	1.3

Steals

Name	SPG
(United States) Hannah Hidalgo	3.1
(Puerto Rico) Mya Hollingshed	2.4
(Chile) Valentina Ojeda	2.3
(United States) Mikayla Blakes	2.0
(United States) Kennedy Smith	2.0

Efficiency

Name	EFFPG
(Brazil) Kamilla Cardoso	24.3
(Brazil) Damiris Dantas	21.0
(Canada) Kayla Alexander	16.1
(United States) Olivia Miles	15.3
(Canada) Yvonne Ejim	14.6

==== Teams ====
Points

Team	PPG
United States	91.3
Brazil	85.7
Canada	74.3
Puerto Rico	67.1
Mexico	65.1

Rebounds

Team	RPG
Canada	54.9
United States	51.3
Brazil	49.1
Mexico	44.3
Puerto Rico	44.3

Assists

Team	APG
Brazil	24.9
United States	23.0
Canada	17.3
Argentina	15.9
Mexico	15.4

Blocks

Team	BPG
United States	5.3
Canada	4.4
Colombia	4.4
Brazil	4.1
Dominican Republic	3.4

Steals

Team	SPG
United States	17.6
Brazil	9.4
Canada	8.3
Mexico	8.1
Puerto Rico	8.1

Efficiency

Team	EFFPG
United States	120.0
Brazil	110.9
Canada	87.4
Puerto Rico	73.3
Colombia	66.9

=== Awards ===
The awards were announced on 7 July 2025.

All-Tournament Team
Guards	Forward	Center
(United States) Mikayla Blakes (United States) Hannah Hidalgo (Canada) Syla Swords	(Brazil) Damiris Dantas	(Brazil) Kamilla Cardoso
MVP: (United States) Mikayla Blakes

All-Second Team
Guards	Forward
(Argentina) Melisa Gretter (Puerto Rico) Arella Guirantes (Brazil) Bella Nascimento (United States) Olivia Miles	(Canada) Kayla Alexander
Rising Star: (Mexico) Gabriela Jaquez
