= Hannah Hidalgo =

American basketball player (born 2005)

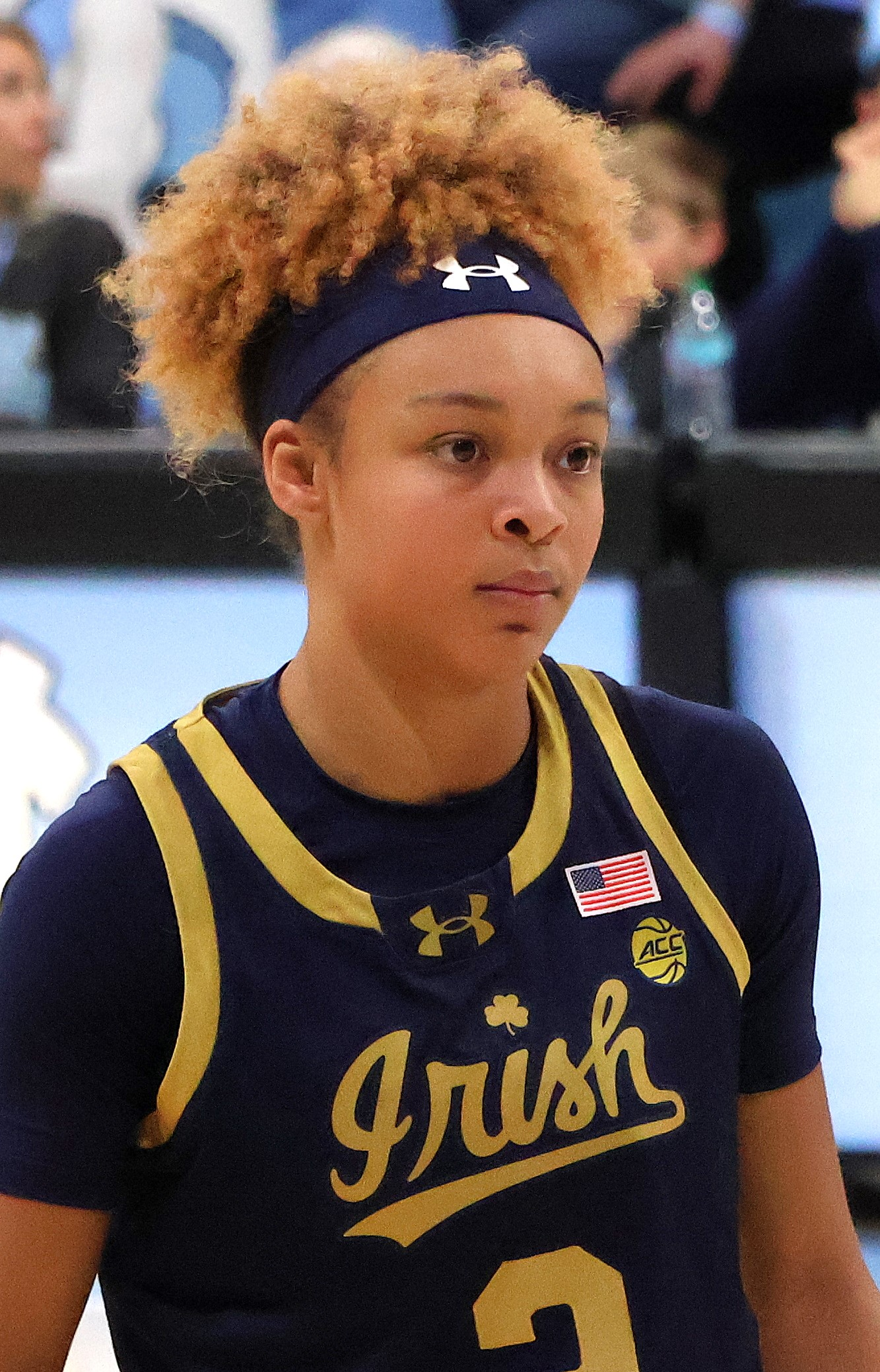
- Hidalgo with Notre Dame in 2025

No. 3 – Notre Dame Fighting Irish
- Position: Point guard
- League: Atlantic Coast Conference

Personal information
- Born: February 22, 2005 (age 21)
- Listed height: 5 ft 7 in (1.70 m)

Career information
- High school: Paul VI (Haddon Township, New Jersey)
- College: Notre Dame (2023–present)

Career highlights
- 2× First-team All-American – AP (2024, 2025); Second-team All-American – AP (2026); 3× WBCA All-American (2024–2026); 2× First-team All-American – USBWA (2025, 2026); Second-team All-American – USBWA (2024); Naismith Defensive Player of the Year (2026); WBCA Defensive Player of the Year (2026); Nancy Lieberman Award (2026); Dawn Staley Award (2024); 2× ACC Player of the Year (2025, 2026); 3× ACC Defensive Player of the Year (2024–2026); 3× First-team All-ACC (2024–2026); 3× ACC All-Defensive Team (2024–2026); ACC Rookie of the Year (2024); ACC All-Freshman Team (2024); ACC Tournament MVP (2024); NCAA all-time season steals leader (2026); NCAA season steals leader (2024, 2026); McDonald's All-American Game Co-MVP (2023); Nike Hoop Summit (2023); USA Basketball Female Athlete of the Year (2023)
Medals
Women's basketball
Representing the United States
FIBA AmeriCup
Gold medal – first place	2025 Chile
FIBA Under-19 World Cup
Gold medal – first place	2023 Spain	Team
FIBA Under-17 World Cup
Gold medal – first place	2022 Hungary	Team

Hannah Grace Hidalgo (born February 22, 2005) is an American college basketball player for the Notre Dame Fighting Irish of the Atlantic Coast Conference (ACC). She attended Paul VI High School in Haddon Township, New Jersey, where she was named a McDonald's All-American and rated the fifth-best player (and best point guard) in her class by ESPN.

Through her junior season at Notre Dame, Hidalgo has won the Dawn Staley Award as the nation's best guard and the Nancy Lieberman Award as the nation's best point guard. She has also earned first-team AP All-American honors as a freshman and sophomore, making her one of only four players in NCAA women's college basketball history to do so in their first two seasons, joining JuJu Watkins, Maya Moore, and Courtney Paris. She won the 2026 Naismith Defensive Player of the Year Award and WBCA Defensive Player of the Year Award, after breaking the NCAA record for steals in a season with 202. She was the first NCAA player this century to average at least 25 points, 5 rebounds, 5 assists, and 5 steals per game in a season.

At the international level, she has won three gold medals with the United States and was named 2023 USA Basketball Female Athlete of the Year. As part of those gold medal efforts, she was named to the 2025 FIBA Women's AmeriCup All-Star Five and the 2023 FIBA U-19 World Cup All-Tournament Team.

== High school career ==
Raised in Merchantville, New Jersey, Hidalgo played basketball for Paul VI High School in Haddonfield, New Jersey, where she was coached by her father, Orlando. As a senior, she averaged 28.8 points, 7.3 steals, 6.4 rebounds and 5.1 assists per game, leading her team to the South Jersey Non-Public A final. Hidalgo was named Courier-Post Player of the Year for her third straight season and was selected as New Jersey Gatorade Player of the Year. She finished as her school's all-time leading scorer, with 2,135 points. Hidalgo played in the McDonald's All-American Game, sharing MVP honors with JuJu Watkins. She scored an event-record 26 points and had eight steals, which tied the record. Rated a five-star recruit and the number five player in her class (and best point guard) by ESPN, she committed to play college basketball for Notre Dame over offers from Michigan, Stanford, Duke, Ohio State and UCF.

== College career ==
=== Freshman season ===
On November 6, 2023, Hidalgo made her college debut, scoring 31 points in a 100–71 loss to AP No. 6 South Carolina. It was the highest-scoring debut by a Notre Dame player since at least 1999. In her next game, on November 12, she posted 26 points, 12 steals, six rebounds and six assists in a 104–57 win over NJIT, matching the program single-game record for steals. On December 21, Hidalgo recorded her first triple-double, with 26 points, 11 rebounds, 10 assists and five steals in an 84–47 win over Western Michigan. On January 27, 2024, she had 34 points, 10 rebounds and six assists in an 82–67 win over AP No. 8 UConn, surpassing the program freshman single-game scoring record held by Michelle Marciniak since 1991. In her following game, she scored a career-high 35 points, along with eight assists and six steals, in an 85–48 win over Georgia Tech. On February 8, Hidalgo tallied 30 points and seven steals in a 73–66 loss to AP No. 15 Louisville, breaking the Notre Dame freshman scoring record. In her next game, she had 27 points, nine assists, seven rebounds and five steals in a 98–94 win over Florida State in double overtime. She surpassed Skylar Diggins for the most steals in a season in program history.

On February 29, Hidalgo set the Atlantic Coast Conference (ACC) freshman scoring record while posting 23 points, 12 rebounds and six assists in a 71–68 win over AP No. 5 Virginia Tech. She earned first-team All-ACC honors and was named ACC Defensive Player of the Year and Rookie of the Year. Hidalgo helped Notre Dame win the 2024 ACC tournament, where she was named tournament MVP. She led her team to the Sweet 16 of the 2024 NCAA tournament, where she tied a season-low 10 points in a 70–65 loss to Oregon State. She was sidelined for four minutes when officials enforced a rule prohibiting jewelry during games, requiring her to remove her nose piercing, which she had worn throughout the season.

As a freshman, Hidalgo averaged 22.6 points, 6.2 rebounds, 5.5 assists, and a nation-leading 4.6 steals per game. Hidalgo was the only player in the nation to average at least 20 points per game, 5 assists per game, 5 rebounds per game, and 4 steals per game. She also broke the Notre Dame single-season records for points per game (previously held by Arike Ogunbowale) and steals per game, while leading the NCAA Division I in defensive win shares at 4.0. Hidalgo was named a first-team All-American by the AP, a second-team All-American by the U.S. Basketball Writers Association (USBWA), and a Women's Basketball Coaches Association (WBCA) Coaches' All-American. She also won the Dawn Staley Award, which honors the best Division I guard.

=== Sophomore season ===
Hidalgo entered her sophomore season as a preseason AP All-American and the preseason ACC Player of the Year. She was joined by Olivia Miles, who returned from an ACL injury, in the backcourt to form one of the best duos in the nation. As a result of Miles's return, Hidalgo shifted over to shooting guard, while Miles played primary point guard for Notre Dame. On November 23, 2024, Hidalgo recorded 24 points and eight assists in a 74–61 win over AP No. 3 USC. On December 5, she posted 30 points and eight rebounds to help Notre Dame defeat AP No. 4 Texas, 80–70, in overtime. In her next game, she became the fastest player in program history to reach 1,000 career points as part of a 24-point, 10-rebound effort in a 93–62 victory over Syracuse (accomplishing this feat in 16 fewer games compared to the previous record-holder). On December 12, Hidalgo tallied 29 points, 10 rebounds, and eight assists in a 79–68 win against AP No. 2 UConn. In January 2025, she missed two games with an ankle injury. On February 2, Hidalgo scored a season-high 34 points in an 88–71 win over Louisville.

Hidalgo became one of only four players in NCAA women's college basketball history to earn AP first-team All-American honors in both her freshman and sophomore seasons, joining JuJu Watkins, Maya Moore, and Courtney Paris. She was also named ACC Player of the Year and ACC Defensive Player of the Year, becoming only the third player in ACC history to earn those honors in the same year. Her average of 23.8 points per game broke the Notre Dame single-season record, which she had set the year before.

=== Junior season ===
Hidalgo entered her junior season as a preseason AP All-American and the preseason ACC Player of the Year. In a November 12, 2025 win over Akron, Hidalgo scored 44 points, setting a record for points scored by a Notre Dame player in a basketball game; in that same game she had 16 steals, setting the NCAA's single-game steals record. She became the first player in NBA, WNBA, or NCAA history to record at least 40 points and 16 steals in a game. On November 21, 2025, she recorded 22 points, 7 rebounds, and 5 steals, which included hitting the game-winning shot with 1.9 seconds left over Kennedy Smith to defeat AP No. 11 USC. On December 21, 2025, she recorded the first 30-point triple-double in program history with 30 points, 13 steals, and 10 assists in their win over Bellarmine. In their January 11, 2026 game against AP No. 22 North Carolina, Hidalgo recorded 31 points, 8 rebounds, 6 assists, and 7 steals in a 73-50 win. On January 22, 2026, she broke the program steals record (previously held by Skylar Diggins) and became the fastest player in ACC history to reach 2,000 points in their win over Miami (86 games). Against AP No. 10 Louisville on March 1, 2026, Hidalgo had 30 points, 10 rebounds, 7 assists, and 5 steals in their 65-62 win.

In the 2026 NCAA tournament, Hidalgo had 31 points, 11 rebounds, 10 steals, and seven assists in a Sweet Sixteen victory against No. 2 seeded Vanderbilt. She became only the second player in NCAA tournament history to record a 30 point triple-double, joining Caitlin Clark in 2023, and the second player in NCAA tournament history to record a triple-double with steals, joining Ticha Penicheiro in 1998. With her performance, Hidalgo reached 26 steals through the first three rounds, surpassing the previous NCAA single-tournament record of 23 by Penicheiro and Emily Engstler in 1998 and 2022, respectively. She also reached 199 steals on the season, surpassing the previous NCAA Division I single-season record of 192 set by Chastadie Barrs in 2019.

Hidalgo ended the season as the NCAA all-time record holder for steals in a season with 202. She became the first player in conference history to win ACC Player of the Year and ACC Defensive Player of the Year in back-to-back seasons. She also holds the ACC single-season scoring record (909 points). Hidalgo was named the Naismith Defensive Player of the Year and WBCA Defenisve Player of the Year. In combining her offensive and defensive prowess, she became the first player to average at least 25 points per game while winning those Defensive Player of the Year awards. Hidalgo became just the second Notre Dame point guard to win the Nancy Lieberman Award, joining Skylar Diggins. She became the first NCAA player this century to average at least 25 points, 5 rebounds, 5 assists, and 5 steals, after finishing the season averaging 25.3 points, 6.9 rebounds, 5.2 assists, and 5.6 steals per game.

== National team career ==
Hidalgo played for the United States at the 2022 FIBA Under-17 Women's Basketball World Cup in Hungary. She averaged 7.7 points, 2.9 assists and 2.6 steals per game, helping her team win the gold medal. Hidalgo was named to the all-tournament team at the 2023 FIBA Under-19 Women's Basketball World Cup in Spain after helping the United States win the gold medal. She averaged 10.7 points, 5.4 assists and 3.4 rebounds per game, breaking team single-game records in assists (13) and steals (8). At the end of the year, she was named USA Basketball Female Athlete of the Year, becoming the second teenager to win the award.

On June 19, 2025, Hidalgo was named to team USA's roster for the 2025 FIBA Women's AmeriCup. During the tournament, she averaged 12.4 points, 4.6 assists, 3.3 rebounds, and 3.1 steals per game and won a gold medal. Hidalgo earned all-tournament All-Star Five honors.

== Player profile ==
Hidalgo primarily plays point guard but has occasionally played the shooting guard position. Her playing style is characterized as a high-energy, attacking two-way player, who is both a tenacious ball-hawking defender and rebounder as well as a shifty, versatile scorer and playmaker who can score the ball at all three levels. NBC analyst LaChina Robinson has called her, "The best two-way guard in the country."

Hall of Fame coach Dawn Staley has praised Hidalgo's all-around game: "Hannah Hidalgo's court vision, passing ability, ball-handling and ability to create scoring opportunities for herself and her teammates combined with her relentless defense is unmatched. She is the embodiment of a two-way force on the basketball court." Similarly, Geno Auriemma has highlighted her attacking style of play and leadership: "Her talent is obvious…even if you're not a basketball person, you can tell that there's a talent level that's pretty unique. But I think, more importantly, is the way she attacks everything that she does—the way she attacks your defense, the way when she's on defense she attacks your offense. And I think the way that she leads her team in so many different ways. I think you put all three of those things together, and it's just a really, really difficult matchup." Auriemma has called her the best point guard in the country and praised her grit, ability to get to any spot on the floor, and defensive disuption: "For people that are not familiar with South Jersey, that's just Philadelphia east, right? So she's got a little bit of that toughness, you know, and grit, like you said, and talent, and it's rare. It's rare that you find a player that is involved in every single play to the point where whoever she's guarding, you have to go hide them someplace, hoping that she's not involved in that play, and she still manages to be involved in the play somehow, some way. So not only offensively, can she get wherever she wants to go, get any shot she wants, but defensively, she probably causes more problems for your offense than any player in the country. I mean, you can deal with a shot blocker, you can deal with that, but you cannot deal with someone that every time you're dribbling the ball, you're you're more worried about where she is than who you're passing it to. I just love watching her [play]."

Hidalgo has also been praised for her high basketball IQ, competitiveness, and intensity. Sports Illustrated columnist Emma Baccellieri has described her as a "film junkie obsessive," while Notre Dame head coach Niele Ivey has praised Hidalgo's basketball IQ and noted her ability to "read people very well." ESPN analyst Chiney Ogumwike has called her a "Tasmanian devil" on the basketball court, and "the most competitive player in women's college hoops, and that's on BOTH ends!"

In terms of player comparisons, Hidalgo's unique combination of skills has led ESPN analyst and Hall of Fame player Rebecca Lobo to say, "Her motor never stops, and she's so disruptive on the defensive end along with her offensive skillset—I just can't think of a comp for her of any player that I've seen."

== Career statistics ==
Legend
GP	Games played	GS	Games started	MPG	Minutes per game	FG%	Field goal percentage
3P%	3-point field goal percentage	FT%	Free throw percentage	RPG	Rebounds per game	APG	Assists per game
SPG	Steals per game	BPG	Blocks per game	TO	Turnovers per game	PPG	Points per game
**Bold**	Career high	*	Led Division I

=== College ===
Hannah Hidalgo NCAA Statistics
Year	Team	GP	GS	MPG	FG%	3P%	FT%	RPG	APG	SPG	BPG	TO	PPG
2023–24	Notre Dame	35	35	35.9	.446	.340	.776	6.2	**5.5**	4.6*	0.1	3.4	22.6
2024–25	Notre Dame	32	32	35.5	.463	**.400**	**.856**	5.0	3.6	3.7	0.2	**2.7**	23.8
2025–26	Notre Dame	**36**	**36**	**36.3**	**.475**	.254	.833	**6.9**	5.2	**5.6***	**0.3**	3.3	**25.3**
**Career**		103	103	35.9	.462	.333	.820	6.1	4.8	4.7	0.2	3.1	23.9

== Off the court ==
=== Personal life ===
Hidalgo is openly Christian and was raised in the religion. In interviews, Hidalgo has stated that her faith deepened during the COVID-19 pandemic. In addition to basketball, Hidalgo competed in soccer and track growing up, as her parents wanted her to play multiple sports. Hidalgo is of mixed Puerto Rican and Black heritage, and she has expressed interest in continuing to learn more about her Puerto Rican heritage from her father's side. She has said, "To be able to have a different type of Hispanic culture...being able to have a small percentage of those people in professional sports, it definitely means a lot." Only 2.9% of Division I women's college basketball players identified as Hispanic or Latina in 2024.

In 2024, Hidalgo created the Hannah's Helping Hands Foundation, which is designed to provide outreach and philanthropic endeavors focused on sports, health, education, financial literacy, and family support for local members of the South Bend, Indiana and Greater Philadelphia communities. In July 2025, Hidalgo was named as one of 14 college players to sign an NIL deal with Unrivaled, under its 'The Future is Unrivaled Class of 2025'.

=== Social media controversy ===
In July 2024, Hidalgo, then a 19-year-old, re-posted a clip on her Instagram story of a conversation between Don Lemon, an openly gay television journalist, and Candace Owens, a conservative political commentator that highlighted Owens' opinion that being in a gay relationship was a "sin" and she, "[didn't] believe marriage can be between two men." Hidalgo later removed the post from her account. In January 2025, former Notre Dame head coach, Muffet McGraw, called the post "almost insulting to her teammates, to everybody in the game of basketball. I was really disappointed that it came out that way. I was happy that she deleted it, but the damage I think was done before she deleted it."

In April 2025, nine months after her reposting the clip of Candace Owens, in an essay written for The Players' Tribune, Hidalgo addressed this controversy and referred to the post as a "mistake" that "[gave] the wrong impression, [and] maybe even hurt people I care about." She went on to write, "I am not homophobic — I love all people, and believe we all deserve to exist authentically."

=== In popular culture ===
In March 2025, ESPN+ announced a second season of their docuseries, Full Court Press would premiere in May 2025. The series (from Peyton Manning's Omaha Productions and Words & Pictures) followed Hidalgo, USC's Kiki Iriafen, and Louisiana State's Flau'jae Johnson throughout their 2024–25 NCAA basketball season and postseason.
