= Shayeann Day-Wilson =

Canadian basketball player (born 2003)

No. 50 – LSU Tigers
- Position: Guard
- League: Southeastern Conference

Personal information
- Born: June 16, 2003 (age 23) Toronto, Ontario, Canada
- Listed height: 5 ft 6 in (1.68 m)

Career information
- High school: Crestwood Preparatory College (Toronto, Ontario)
- College: Duke (2021–2023); Miami (FL) (2023–2024); LSU (2024–2025)

Career highlights
- ACC Rookie of the Year (2022); All-ACC Freshman Team (2022)
Medals
Women's basketball
Representing Canada
FIBA Women's AmeriCup
| Bronze medal – third place | 2025 Chile |

Shayeann Day-Wilson (born June 16, 2003) is a Canadian college basketball player for LSU.

== High school career ==
Day-Wilson was born to Patrick Shaw and Rose Day, and has one brother, Collin, and two sisters, Zakayla and Akayla. She attended Crestwood Preparatory College, where she led her team to consecutive Ontario Scholastic Basketball Association (OSBA) high school championships. On May 18, 2020, she verbally committed to play college basketball at Syracuse, however, she decommitted from Syracruse after former head coach Quentin Hillsman resigned. In September 2021, she committed to play for Duke.

== College career ==
During the 2021–22 season, in her freshman year, she appeared in 29 games, while starting the final 17 games of the season, and averaged 12.7 points, 3.7 assists, 3.0 rebounds and 1.2 steals. She led her team in scoring and scored 368 points, the tenth most points by a freshman in program history. On November 28, 2021, she scored a then career-high 26 points in a game against Troy. She shot 8-of-10 on three-point field goals, tying Miela Goodchild and Rebecca Greenwell's program record for three-pointers in a game. She was subsequently named ACC Freshman of the Week. Following the season she was named the ACC Rookie of the Year by the coaches and named to the All-ACC Freshman team. During the 2022–23 season, in her sophomore year, she started 29 games, and averaged 8.1 points, 2.9 rebounds and 2.5 assists in 24.3 minutes per game. She reached double figures in scoring in 12 games.

On April 23, 2023, she transferred to Miami (FL). During the 2023–24 season, in her junior year, she appeared in 31 games with 25 starts, and averaged 11.9 points, 2.7 rebounds, and 3.5 assists per game. On March 3, 2024, she scored a career-high 27 points in a game against Georgia Tech.

On April 24, 2024, she transferred to LSU. During the 2024–25 season, in her senior year, she appeared in 32 games with 21 starts, and averaged 3.5 points, 2.0 rebounds, and 3.4 assists per game.

== National team career ==
Day-Wilson made her national team debut for Canada at the 2021 FIBA Under-19 Women's Basketball World Cup. During the tournament she averaged 18.1 points, 5.9 rebounds, 5.7 assists and 1.3 steals in seven games. She led her team in scoring and assists, and ranked second among all players in the tournament.

On June 25, 2025, she was named to team Canada's roster for the 2025 FIBA Women's AmeriCup. During the tournament she averaged 8.7 points, 4 rebounds and 4.3 assists per game and won a bronze medal.
