= Mikayla Blakes =

American basketball player (born 2005)

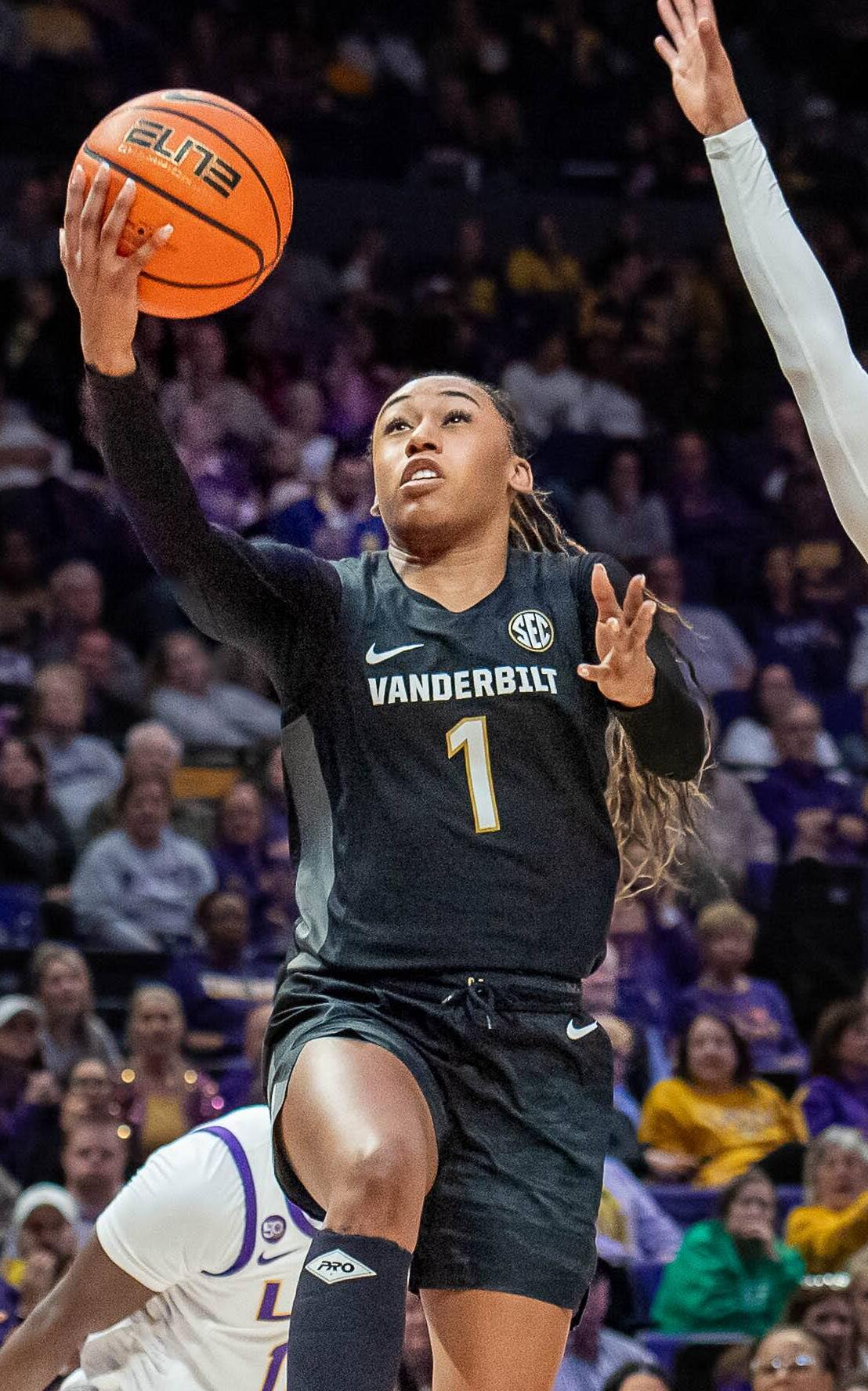
- Blakes with Vanderbilt in 2025

No. 1 – Vanderbilt Commodores
- Position: Shooting guard
- League: Southeastern Conference

Personal information
- Born: December 29, 2005 (age 20)
- Listed height: 5 ft 8 in (1.73 m)

Career information
- High school: Rutgers Prep (Somerset, New Jersey)
- College: Vanderbilt (2024–present)

Career highlights
- USA Basketball Female Athlete of the Year (2025); WBCA Coaches' All-American (2026); First-team All-American – USBWA, AP (2026); Second-team All-American – USBWA (2025); Third-team All-American – AP (2025); USBWA National Freshman of the Year (2025); Ann Meyers Drysdale Award (2026); SEC Player of the Year (2026); SEC Freshman of the Year (2025); 2× First-team All-SEC (2025, 2026); SEC All-Freshman Team (2025); McDonald's All-American (2024); Nike Hoop Summit (2024); FIBA AmeriCup MVP (2025)
Medals
Women's basketball
Representing United States
FIBA AmeriCup
Gold medal – first place	2025 Chile

Mikayla Blakes (born December 29, 2005) is an American college basketball player for the Vanderbilt Commodores of the Southeastern Conference (SEC).

== High school career ==
Blakes played basketball for Rutgers Preparatory School in Somerset, New Jersey. She helped her team reach three straight New Jersey Non-Public B state finals, winning the title as a sophomore, and was twice named Courier News Player of the Year. In her senior season, Blakes was selected to play in the McDonald's All-American Game. Rated a five-star recruit and the number 8 player in her class by ESPN, she committed to play college basketball for Vanderbilt over offers from Indiana, Rutgers, Stanford, Tennessee, UCLA, and Wisconsin.

== College career ==
On January 2, 2025, Blakes scored 36 points in a 108–82 victory over Georgia, setting a new Vanderbilt single-game record for points by a freshman. On January 19, she scored 23 points and made the game-winning shot in a 71–70 win over Tennessee. On January 30, Blakes set single-game scoring records for both the Southeastern Conference (SEC) and Vanderbilt, with 53 points in a 99–86 victory over Florida. She had the most points in a game by an NCAA Division I freshman since Elena Delle Donne of Delaware in 2010. On February 16, Blakes broke the Division I freshman single-game scoring record, previously held by Delle Donne, with 55 points in a 98–88 overtime win over Auburn. She shot 23-of-24 from the free throw line and led a 15-point comeback.

Blakes was awarded the Tamika Catchings National Freshman of the Year by USBWA for the 2024–25 season.

== Career statistics ==
Legend
GP	Games played	GS	Games started	MPG	Minutes per game	FG%	Field goal percentage	3P%	3-point field goal percentage
FT%	Free throw percentage	RPG	Rebounds per game	APG	Assists per game	SPG	Steals per game	BPG	Blocks per game
TO	Turnovers per game	PPG	Points per game	**Bold**	Career high	*	Led Division I

=== College ===
Year	Team	GP	GS	MPG	FG%	3P%	FT%	RPG	APG	SPG	BPG	TO	PPG
2024–25	Vanderbilt	33	32	32.2	.456	.342	.885	3.4	3.2	2.4	.2	2.9	23.3

== Personal life ==
Blakes' father, Monroe, played college basketball for Saint Michael's in the NCAA Division II and was inducted into the school's Athletics Hall of Fame. Her older brother, Jaylen, played college basketball for Duke before transferring to Stanford.

In April 2025, Blakes was invited to Kelsey Plum's Dawg Class, an Under Armour-sponsored camp to help top college athletes transition from collegiate to professional basketball.
