= Olivia Miles =

American basketball player (born 2003)

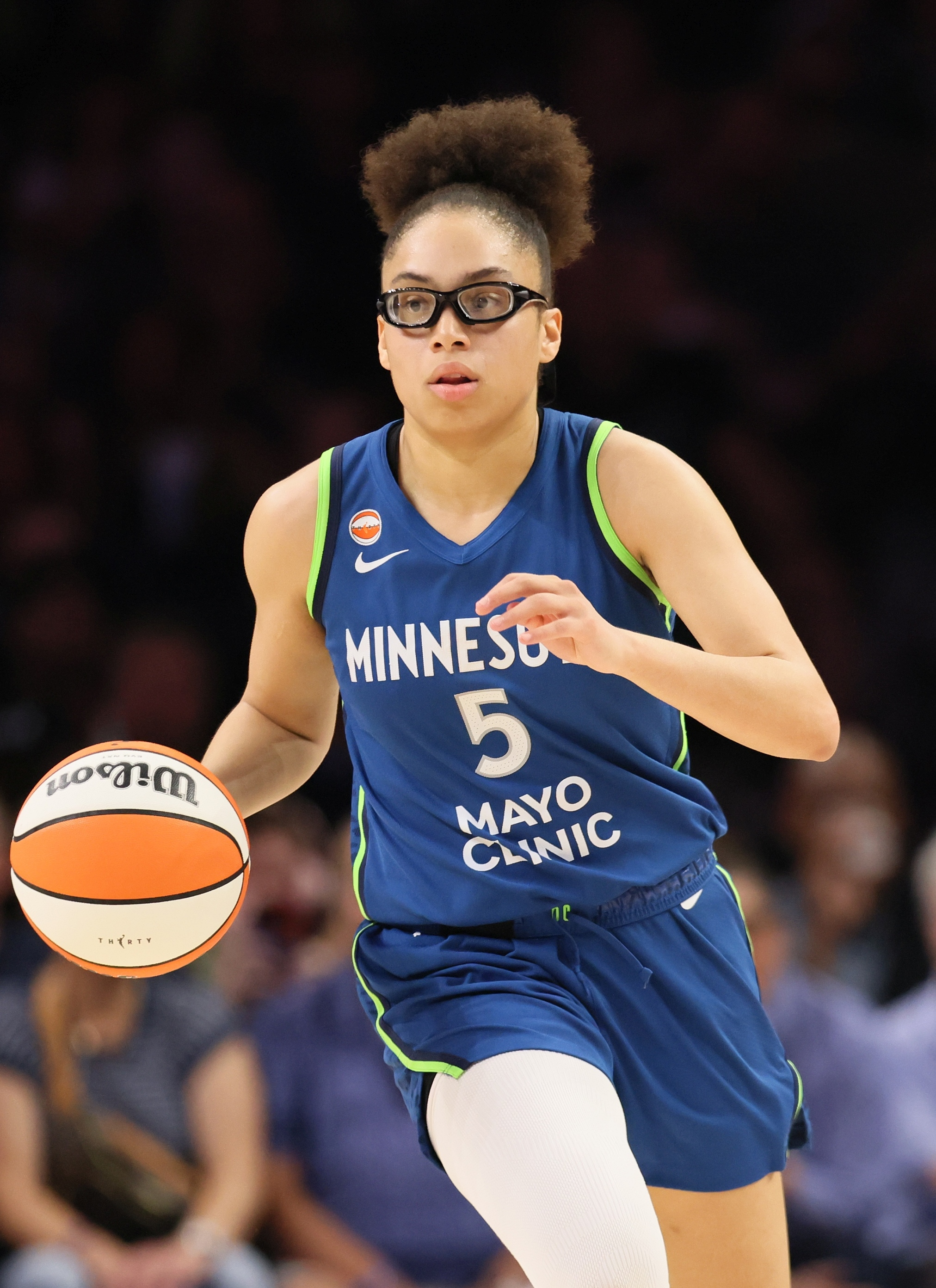
- Miles with the Minnesota Lynx in 2026

No. 5 – Galatasaray
- Position: Point guard
- League: Turkish Super League; EuroLeague Women; WNBA

Personal information
- Born: January 29, 2003 (age 23)
- Listed height: 5 ft 10 in (1.78 m)
- Listed weight: 168 lb (76 kg)

Career information
- High school: Blair Academy (Blairstown, New Jersey)
- College: Notre Dame (2021–2025); TCU (2025–2026)
- WNBA draft: 2026: 1st round, 2nd overall pick
- Drafted by: Minnesota Lynx
- Playing career: 2026–present

Career history
- 2026–present: Minnesota Lynx
- 2027–present: Galatasaray

Career highlights
- WNBA Rookie of the Year (2026); WNBA All-Star (2026); All-WNBA First Team (2026); WNBA All-Rookie Team (2026); All-American – WBCA (2026); 3× Second-team All-American – AP (2023, 2025, 2026); 2× Second-team All-American – USBWA (2025, 2026); Third-team All-American – USBWA (2023); Big 12 Player of the Year (2026); First-team All-Big 12 (2026); 3× First-team All-ACC (2022, 2023, 2025)
- Stats at Basketball Reference
Medals
Women's basketball
Representing the United States
FIBA AmeriCup
Gold medal – first place	2025 Chile
FIBA Americas Under-16 Championship
Gold medal – first place	2019 Chile	Team

Olivia Rose Miles (born January 29, 2003) is an American professional basketball player for the Minnesota Lynx of the Women's National Basketball Association (WNBA) and Hive of Unrivaled who was unanimously named the 2026 WNBA Rookie of the Year. She played college basketball for the Notre Dame Fighting Irish and TCU Horned Frogs.

== High school career ==
Born in Summit, New Jersey and later a resident of Phillipsburg, New Jersey, Miles played basketball for Blair Academy in Blairstown, New Jersey. In her junior season, she averaged 13.6 points, 8.1 rebounds and 7.6 assists per game, leading her team to the Prep A state title. Miles competed for the Philadelphia Belles on the Amateur Athletic Union circuit, with whom she won a Nike Elite Youth Basketball League title in June 2019. In addition to basketball, she played soccer in high school. Miles was selected to the Jordan Brand Classic roster. Rated a five-star recruit by ESPN, she committed to play college basketball for Notre Dame after also considering Stanford and North Carolina. ESPN called her "a combination of Sue Bird, Steve Nash and Diana Taurasi" while she was still in high school.

== College career ==
Miles opted to enroll early at Notre Dame and joined the team on January 25, 2021. Over six games in her first season, she averaged 9.3 points and 3.5 assists per game. On November 21, 2021, Miles posted 14 points and 14 assists, three short of the program single-game record, in a 94–35 win over Bryant. On December 8, she joined Marina Mabrey as the only Notre Dame freshmen to record a triple-double, with 11 points, 13 rebounds and 13 assists in a 73–56 win against Valparaiso. Miles scored a season-high 30 points in a 74–61 win against Boston College on January 30, 2022. In the first round of the NCAA tournament, she became the first freshman in women's or men's tournament history to register a triple-double, with 12 points, 11 rebounds and 11 assists in an 89–78 victory over UMass. As a freshman, Miles averaged 13.7 points, 5.7 rebounds and 7.4 assists per game, ranking second to Caitlin Clark in assists among NCAA Division I players. She was named first-team All-Atlantic Coast Conference (ACC).

On December 10, 2022, Miles posted 13 points, 13 rebounds and 14 assists in a 108–44 win over Merrimack, surpassing Skylar Diggins and Jackie Young for the most triple-doubles in Notre Dame history, with three. On February 16, 2023, she made the game-winning shot as time expired, while recording 18 points, 11 rebounds and nine assists, in a 78–76 victory over Louisville. Miles suffered a season-ending knee injury during her team's regular season finale against Louisville on February 26. As a sophomore, she averaged 14.3 points, 7.3 rebounds and 6.9 assists per game. Miles was named first-team All-ACC, second-team All-American by the Associated Press (AP) and third-team All-American by the United States Basketball Writers Association (USBWA).

After earning two degrees from Notre Dame, on March 31, 2025, Miles entered the transfer portal for her remaining eligibility instead of choosing to enter the WNBA draft where she was anticipated as the #2 pick. In her time playing for TCU, she "averaged career highs for points (19.6), free throw percentage (.839) and minutes (35.4). She averaged 7.2 rebounds and 6.6 assists per game. She earned Big 12 Player of the Year. She scored a career high 40 points in one game, grabbed a career best 16 rebounds in another and tied her career high with 14 assists." Miles wanted to have more time to build physical and mental strength after missing the 2023-24 season due to an ACL injury and credits her time at TCU with preparing her to play professionally.

== Professional career ==
=== WNBA ===
==== Minnesota Lynx (2026–present) ====
===== 2026: Rookie season =====
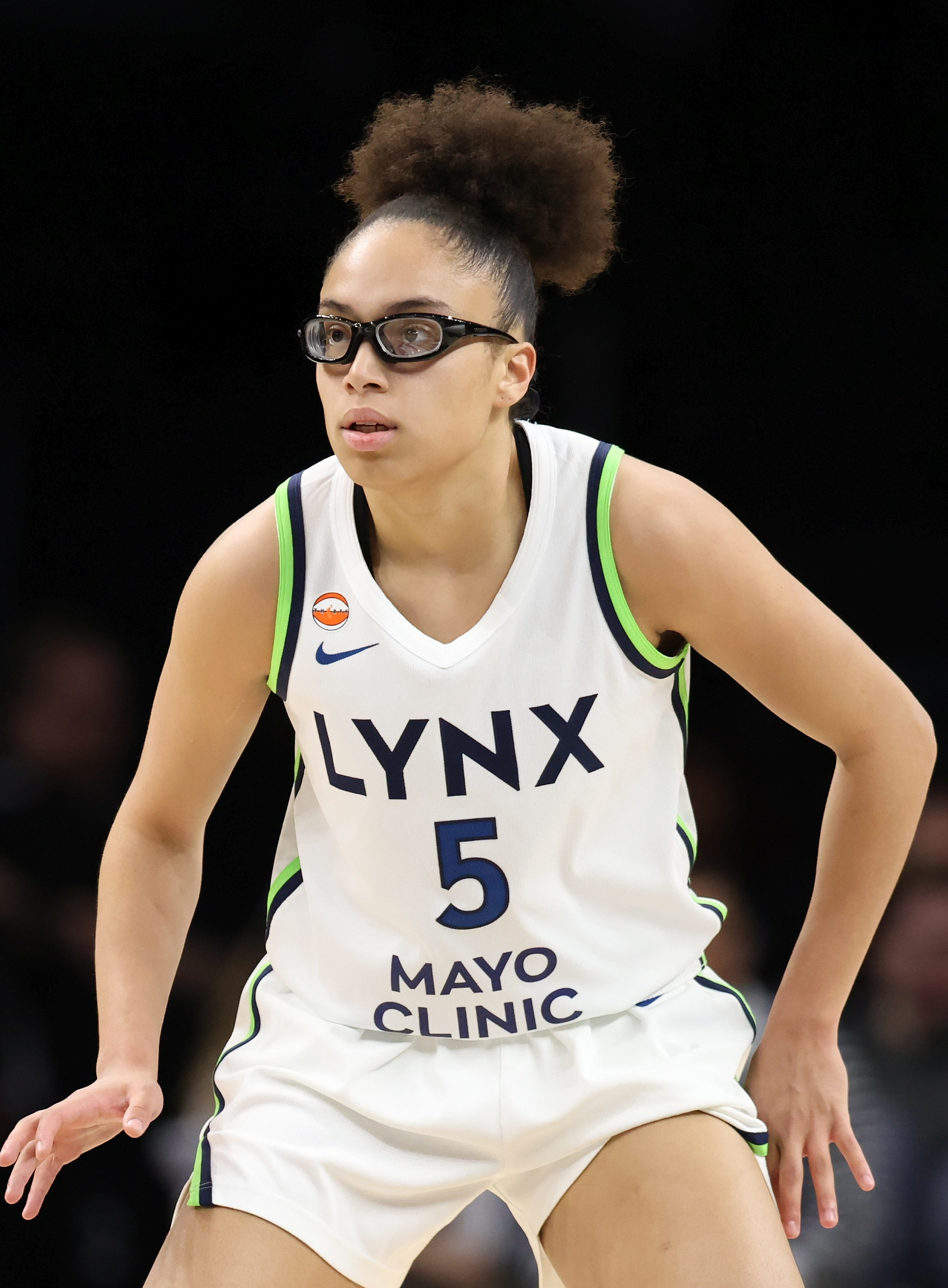
Miles with the Minnesota Lynx in 2026

On April 13, 2026, the Minnesota Lynx selected Miles as the second overall pick of the 2026 WNBA draft. On May 10, she made her 2026 season debut, recording 21 points, 8 assists, and 3 rebounds in a 91–90 loss to the Atlanta Dream, becoming the fifth player in league history to record at least 20 points and 5 assists on debut. On May 14, in a 90–86 victory over the Dallas Wings, Miles recorded 15 points, 6 assists, and 2 rebounds, becoming the first player in WNBA history to record at least 45 points and 20 assists in their first three games. On June 1, Miles had her first double-double, with 19 points and 10 assists in a 111–77 victory over the Phoenix Mercury. On June 3, she was named Rookie of the Month after averaging 15.4 points, 5.1 rebounds, and 5.9 assists in May. On June 4, in an 87–84 victory over the Golden State Valkyries, Miles scored 28 points and set the WNBA rookie record for the most three-point field goals in a single game (8). She was named the Western Conference Player of the Week for June 1-7, 2026. On June 15, Miles joined Paige Bueckers in becoming the fastest player to score 250+ points and 50+ assists in the league.

In the June 17, 2026, game against Los Angeles, Miles set a league record for the most points scored by a rookie in the first half with 24 points (finishing with 31 points in the game) and most field goals made by a rookie in the first half with 10 field goals (finishing with 12 field goals in the game). Miles set the league record for the most points generated in her first 15 games as a rookie with a total of 485 points with 285 career points and a total of 200 assists. On July 2, 2026, she was named as the only rookie on the league All-Star starters. On July 3, 2026, Miles was again named the league Rookie of the Month, this time for June. After the July 11, 2026, game against the New York Liberty, Miles broke the league record for reaching the mark of 350 points, 100 rebounds, and 100 assists, doing so in 21 games and breaking the record previously set and shared by Andrea Stinson and Caitlin Clark. Miles earned her third Rookie of the Month award for July, making her the first Lynx player to earn this award three times. She also had the most games in WNBA history by a rookie "with 20 or more points while shooting 50/40/90 shooting splits" in July. She became the fastest player to reach 500 points with 150 assists in a record 26 games. On August 18, 2026, the league named Miles the Western Conference Player of the Week for games played August 10-16. On September 2, 2026, Miles earned her fourth Rookie of the Month award from the league. Miles set the new record for the most points scored in a season by a rookie on September 20, 2026, when she reached 790 points, breaking the record previously held by Caitlin Clark. On September 28, 2026, Miles was unanimously named the 2026 WNBA Rookie of the Year.

=== Unrivaled ===
On April 12, 2026, Miles signed a multi-year contract with Unrivaled, a 3x3 basketball league. She will make her league debut in the 2027 season.

=== Overseas ===
She signed a contract with Turkish giant Galatasaray on November 20, 2026. The contract will begin in March 2027 and will be valid until the end of the 2026–27 season.

== National team career ==
Miles played for the United States national under-16 team at the 2019 FIBA Under-16 Americas Championship in Chile. She averaged 5.2 points, 2.2 rebounds and 7.5 assists per game, helping her team win the gold medal.

She made her senior international debut at the 2025 FIBA Women's AmeriCup and won a gold medal. Miles led the team in efficiency and the competition in assists.

== Career statistics ==
Legend
GP	Games played	GS	Games started	MPG	Minutes per game	RPG	Rebounds per game
APG	Assists per game	SPG	Steals per game	BPG	Blocks per game	PPG	Points per game
TO	Turnovers per game	FG%	Field-goal percentage	3P%	3-point field-goal percentage	FT%	Free-throw percentage
**Bold**	Career best	°	League leader

=== College ===
Year	Team	GP	GS	MPG	FG%	3P%	FT%	RPG	APG	SPG	BPG	TO	PPG
2020–21	Notre Dame	6	0	22.7	**51.1**	10.0	46.7	3.7	3.5	1.2	0.2	3.0	9.3
2021–22	Notre Dame	33	33	33.4	45.5	27.0	67.7	5.7	**7.4**°	1.8	0.2	3.8	13.7
2022–23	Notre Dame	28	28	31.7	46.0	22.8	76.7	**7.3**	6.9°	**2.1**	0.2	3.3	14.3
2023–24	Notre Dame	Did not play due to injury											
2024–25	Notre Dame	34	34	33.0	48.3	**40.6**	79.0	5.6	5.8°	1.4	0.2	**2.5**	15.4
2025–26	TCU	**38**	**38**	**35.4**	48.1	35.1	**83.9**	7.2	6.6	1.8	0.3	3.7	**19.6**
**Career**		139	133	33.0	47.2	33.1	76.9	6.3	6.5	1.7	0.2	3.3	15.6
Statistics retrieved from Sports-Reference.

== Personal life ==
Miles graduated from Notre Dame in 2024 with a bachelor's degree in political science. She followed up by earning a master's degree in nonprofit administration from Notre Dame in 2025. A dream of hers is to start a nonprofit organization to help support kids in sports. She won the Kay Yow Scholar Athlete of the Year award in 2025. In her final year of collegiate eligibility, Miles also earned a Master of Liberal Arts degree from TCU. Miles has earned the nickname "The Spectacle" given by Lynx fans to honor her exciting play and her vision-correcting goggles.

Miles is a lesbian. Before she was drafted in the WNBA, she'd told a reporter "I'm rooting for the lesbians. I just have to - always. The gays, the they's. All of them."

In June 2025, Miles and her former Notre Dame teammate Maddy Westbeld, also a WNBA player, "hard launched" their relationship during the 2025 Pride month, through several social-media posts. The couple have a cat named Beans.

=== Business interests ===
On July 21, 2025, Miles was signed by Unrivaled, a 3x3 basketball league, to NIL deals as part of "The Future is Unrivaled Class of 2025". On June 23, 2026, GlassesUSA.com announced a collection and a "Trust Your Vision" campaign with Miles. The collection includes sports goggles and daily frames.
