= Macarena D'Urso =

Argentine basketball player

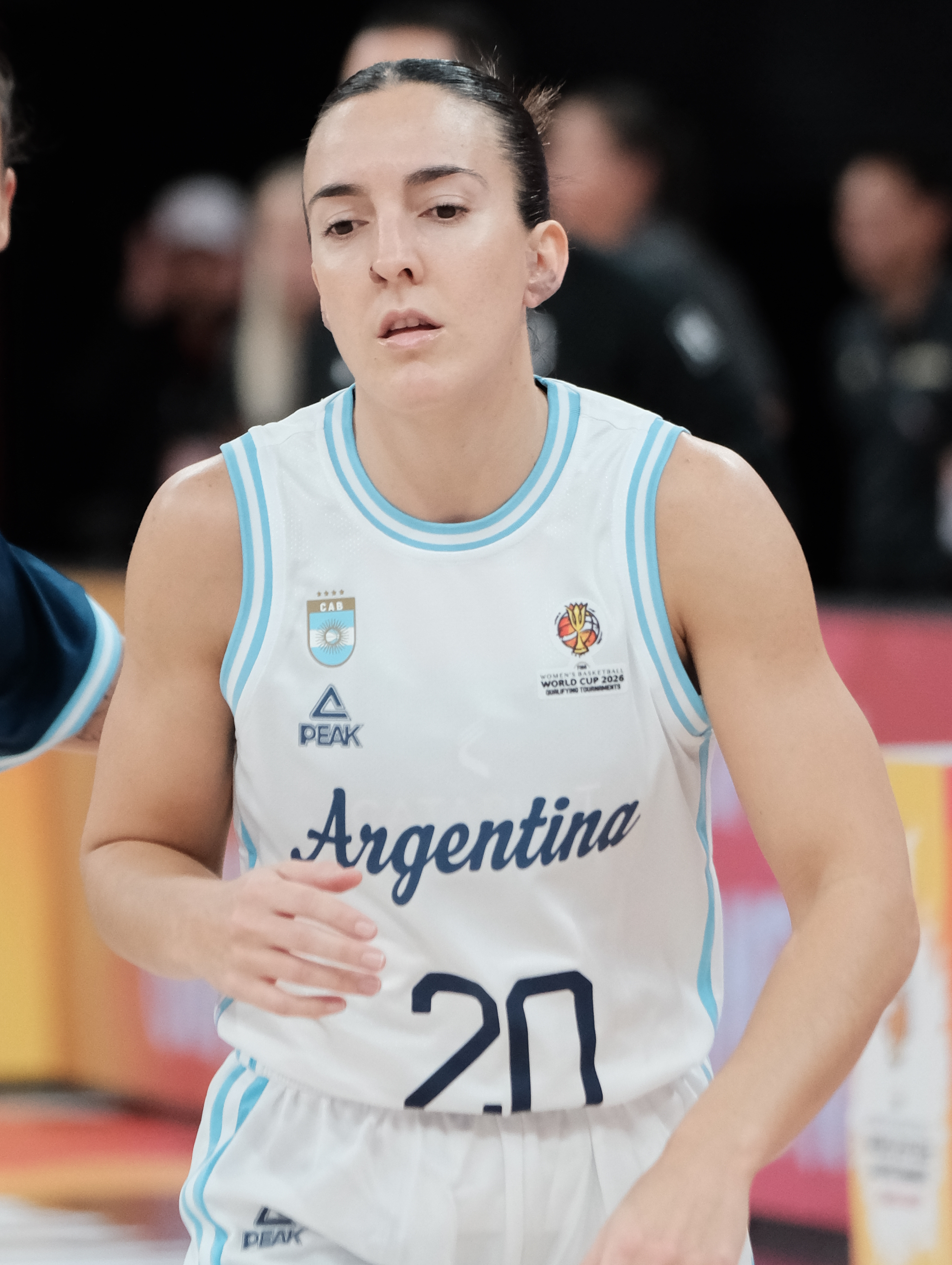

No. 20 – Tindastóll
- Position: Point guard
- League: Úrvalsdeild kvenna

Personal information
- Born: 16 December 1991 (age 34) Buenos Aires, Argentina
- Listed height: 164 cm (5 ft 5 in)
- Listed weight: 63 kg (139 lb)

Career history
- 2026–present: Tindastóll
Medals
Women's basketball
Representing Argentina
South American Championship
Gold medal – first place	2024 Chile	Team

Macarena Rocío D'Urso (born 16 December 1991) is an Argentine basketball player and a member of the Argentine national team.

She participated at the 2018 FIBA Women's Basketball World Cup.

In June 2026, D'Urso signed with Tindastóll of the Icelandic Úrvalsdeild kvenna.
