= 2021–22 Southeastern Conference women's basketball season =

2021–22 SEC women's basketball season
- League: NCAA Division I
- Sport: Basketball
- Teams: 14

WNBA draft

Regular season
- 2022 SEC champions: South Carolina
- Season MVP: Aliyah Boston, South Carolina

Tournament
- Champions: Kentucky
- Runners-up: South Carolina
- Finals MVP: Rhyne Howard, Kentucky

Basketball seasons
- ← 2020–21 2022–23 →

2021–22 SEC women's basketball standings
	Conf.				Overall
Team	W		L	PCT	W		L	PCT
No. 1 South Carolina	15	–	1	.938	35	–	2	.946
No. 9 LSU	13	–	3	.813	26	–	6	.813
No. 18 Tennessee	11	–	5	.688	25	–	9	.735
Ole Miss	10	–	6	.625	23	–	9	.719
Florida	10	–	6	.625	21	–	11	.656
Georgia	9	–	7	.563	21	–	10	.677
No. 15 Kentucky †	8	–	8	.500	19	–	12	.613
Missouri	7	–	9	.438	18	–	13	.581
Arkansas	7	–	9	.438	18	–	14	.563
Alabama	6	–	10	.375	20	–	14	.588
Mississippi State	6	–	10	.375	15	–	14	.517
Texas A&M	4	–	12	.250	14	–	15	.483
Vanderbilt	4	–	12	.250	16	–	19	.457
Auburn	2	–	14	.125	10	–	18	.357
† 2022 SEC tournament winner Rankings from AP poll

The 2021–22 SEC women's basketball season began in December 2021, following the start of the 2021–22 NCAA Division I women's basketball season in November. Conference play concluded in February, followed by the 2022 SEC women's basketball tournament at the Bridgestone Arena in Nashville, Tennessee, in March. This was the 40th season since the SEC first sponsored women's sports, including basketball, in the 1982–83 school year.

In August 2021, the SEC announced policies regarding game cancellations related to COVID-19. In the event a team is unable to begin or complete a regular season conference event, due to the unavailability of participants (from COVID-19, injuries or other reasons), that team will forfeit the contest and will be assigned a loss in the conference standings. The opposing team that is ready to play will be credited with a win in the standings. Both teams will be deemed to have played and completed the contest for purpose of the standings. If both teams are unable to compete, both teams shall be deemed to have forfeited the game, with a loss assigned to both teams and applied to the standings.

== Pre-season ==
=== Pre-season team predictions ===
	Media	Coaches
1.	South Carolina	
2.	Tennessee	Texas A&M
3.	Texas A&M	Tennessee
4.	Kentucky	Georgia
5.	Georgia	Kentucky
6.	Arkansas	Ole Miss
7.	LSU	Arkansas
8.	Ole Miss	LSU
9.	Mississippi State	
10.	Alabama	Missouri
11.	Missouri	Florida
12.	Florida	Alabama
13.	Auburn	
14.	Vanderbilt	

=== Pre-season All-SEC teams ===
Media	Coaches
**Rhyne Howard, Kentucky**	**Howard**
	Aliyah Boston, South Carolina
	Lavender Briggs, Florida
	Shakira Austin, Ole Miss
	Khayla Pointer, LSU
	Rickea Jackson, Mississippi State
	Rae Burrell, Tennessee
	Zia Cooke, South Carolina

- Coaches select eight players
- Player in bold is choice for SEC Player of the Year

== Head coaches ==
Note: Stats shown are before the beginning of the season. Overall and SEC records are from time at current school.

Team	Head coach	Previous job	Seasons at school	Overall record	SEC record	NCAA tournaments	NCAA Final Fours	NCAA championships
Alabama	Kristy Curry	Texas Tech	9th	133–118	46–82	1	0	0
Arkansas	Mike Neighbors	Washington	5th	78–50	28–35	1	0	0
Auburn	Johnnie Harris	Texas (associate HC)	1st	0–0	0–0	0	0	0
Florida	Kelly Rae Finley	Florida (asst.)	1st	0–0	0–0	0	0	0
Georgia	Joni Taylor	Georgia (asst.)	7th	119–65	54–40	3	0	0
Kentucky	Kyra Elzy	Kentucky (associate HC)	2nd	18–9	9–6	1	0	0
LSU	Kim Mulkey	Baylor	1st	0–0	0–0	0	0	0
Mississippi State	Doug Novak	Mississippi State (asst.)	1st	0–0	0–0	0	0	0
Missouri	Robin Pingeton	Illinois State	12th	189–151	69–73	4	0	0
Ole Miss	Yolett McPhee-McCuin	Jacksonville	4th	31–57	7–39	0	0	0
South Carolina	Dawn Staley	Temple	13th	331–103	152–54	9	3	1
Tennessee	Kellie Harper	Missouri State	3rd	38–18	19–10	1	0	0
Texas A&M	Gary Blair	Arkansas	19th	430–170	100–42	15	1	1
Vanderbilt	Shea Ralph	UConn (asst.)	1st	0–0	0–0	0	0	0

== Postseason ==
=== SEC tournament ===
- March 2–6 at the Bridgestone Arena in Nashville, Tennessee. Teams are seeded by conference record, with ties broken by record between the tied teams followed by record against the regular-season champion.

**2022 SEC women's basketball tournament seeds and results**
Seed	School	Conf.	Over.	Tiebreaker	First Round March 2	Second Round March 3	Quarterfinals March 4	Semifinals March 5	Championship March 6
1	‡†**South Carolina**	15–1	27–1		Bye	Bye	vs. #8 Arkansas; **W, 76–54**	vs. #4 Ole Miss; **W, 61–51**	vs. #7 Kentucky; **L, 62–64**
2	†**LSU**	13–3	25–4		Bye	Bye	vs. #7 Kentucky; **L, 63–78**		
3	†**Tennessee**	11–5	22–7		Bye	Bye	vs. #11 Alabama; **W, 74–59**	vs. #7 Kentucky; **L, 74–83**	
4	†**Ole Miss**	10–6	22–7	1–0 vs. UF	Bye	Bye	vs. #5 Florida; **W, 70–60**	vs. #1 South Carolina; **L, 51–61**	
5	#**Florida**	10–6	21–9	0–1 vs. OM	Bye	vs. #13 Vanderbilt; **W, 53–52**	vs. #4 Ole Miss; **L, 60–70**		
6	#**Georgia**	9–7	20–9		Bye	vs. #11 Alabama; **L, 62–74**			
7	#**Kentucky**	8–8	16–11		Bye	vs. #10 Mississippi State; **W, 88–67**	vs. #2 LSU; **W, 78–63**	vs. #3 Tennessee; **W, 83–74**	vs. #1 South Carolina; **W, 64–62**
8	#**Arkansas**	7–9	18–12	2–0 vs. MU	Bye	vs. #9 Missouri; **W, 61–52**	vs. #1 South Carolina; **L, 54–76**		
9	#**Missouri**	7–9	18–12	0–2 vs. ARK	Bye	vs. #8 Arkansas; **L, 52–61**			
10	#**Mississippi State**	6–10	15–14	1–0 vs. ALA	Bye	vs. #7 Kentucky; **L, 67–88**			
11	**Alabama**	6–10	17–12	0–1 vs. MSU	vs. #14 Auburn; **W, 75–68**	vs. #6 Georgia; **W, 74–62**	vs. #3 Tennessee; **L, 59–74**		
12	**Texas A&M**	4–12	14–15	1–0 vs. VU	vs. #13 Vanderbilt; **L, 69–85**				
13	**Vanderbilt**	4–12	14–18	0–1 vs. TAMU	vs. #12 Texas A&M; **W, 85–69**	vs. #5 Florida; **L, 52–53**			
14	**Auburn**	2–14	10–18		vs. #11 Alabama; **L, 68–75**				
‡ – SEC regular season champions, and tournament No. 1 seed † – Received a double-bye in the conference tournament # – Received a single-bye in the conference tournament Overall records include all games played in the tournament.

=== NCAA Division I women's basketball tournament ===
- March 16 – April 3

Seed	Bracket	School	First round	Second round	Sweet 16	Elite 8	Final Four	Championship
1	Greensboro	South Carolina	vs. #16 Howard; **W, 79–21**	vs. #8 Miami; **W, 49–23**	vs. #5 North Carolina; **W, 69–61**	vs. #10 Creighton; **W, 80–50**	vs. #1W Louisville; **W, 72–59**	vs. #2B UConn; **W, 64–49**
3	Spokane	LSU	vs. #14 Jackson State; **W, 83–77**	vs. #6 Iowa State; **L, 64–79**				
4	Wichita	Tennessee	vs. #13 Buffalo; **W, 80–67**	vs. #12 Belmont; **W, 70–67**	vs. #1 Louisville; **L, 64–76**			
6	Greensboro	Georgia	vs. #11 Dayton; **W, 70–54**	vs. #3 Iowa State; **L, 44–67**				
6	Bridgeport	Kentucky	vs. #11 Princeton; **L, 62–69**					
7	Wichita	Ole Miss	vs. #10 South Dakota; **L, 61–75**					
10	Bridgeport	Florida	vs. #7 UCF; **L, 52–69**					
10	Spokane	Arkansas	vs. #7 Utah; **L, 69–92**					
**# Bids: 8**	W-L (%):	TOTAL: 10–7 (.588)	4–4 (.500)	2–2 (.500)	1–1 (.500)	1–0 (1.000)	1–0 (1.000)	1–0 (1.000)

=== Women's National Invitation Tournament ===
- March 16 – April 1

School	First round March 16	Second round March 20	Third round March 24	Quarterfinals March 27
Alabama	vs. Troy; **W, 82–79**	vs. Tulane; **W, 81–77**	vs. Houston; **W, 79–64**	vs. South Dakota State; **L, 73–78**
Missouri	vs. Drake; **L, 78–83^{OT}**			
Vanderbilt	vs. Murray State; **W, 73–47**	vs. Liberty; **W, 71–45**	vs. Middle Tennessee State; **L, 53–55**	
