= 2022 SEC women's basketball tournament =

American college basketball postseason tournament

- Classification: Division I
- Season: 2021–22
- Teams: 14
- Site: Bridgestone Arena; Nashville, TN
- Champions: Kentucky (2nd title)
- Winning coach: Kyra Elzy (1st title)
- MVP: Rhyne Howard (Kentucky)
- Attendance: 51,045
- Television: SEC Network, ESPNU, ESPN

2021–22 SEC women's basketball standings
	Conf.				Overall
Team	W		L	PCT	W		L	PCT
No. 1 South Carolina	15	–	1	.938	35	–	2	.946
No. 9 LSU	13	–	3	.813	26	–	6	.813
No. 18 Tennessee	11	–	5	.688	25	–	9	.735
Ole Miss	10	–	6	.625	23	–	9	.719
Florida	10	–	6	.625	21	–	11	.656
Georgia	9	–	7	.563	21	–	10	.677
No. 15 Kentucky †	8	–	8	.500	19	–	12	.613
Missouri	7	–	9	.438	18	–	13	.581
Arkansas	7	–	9	.438	18	–	14	.563
Alabama	6	–	10	.375	20	–	14	.588
Mississippi State	6	–	10	.375	15	–	14	.517
Texas A&M	4	–	12	.250	14	–	15	.483
Vanderbilt	4	–	12	.250	16	–	19	.457
Auburn	2	–	14	.125	10	–	18	.357
† 2022 SEC tournament winner Rankings from AP poll

The 2022 Southeastern Conference women's basketball tournament was a postseason women's basketball tournament for the Southeastern Conference held at the Bridgestone Arena in Nashville, Tennessee, from March 2 through 6, 2022. The winner received an automatic bid to the 2022 NCAA Division I women's basketball tournament. In the championship game, the seventh-seeded Kentucky Wildcats pulled off a major upset against the top-seeded and top-ranked South Carolina Gamecocks, 64–62.

== Seeds ==
Seed	School	Conference record	Overall record	Tiebreaker
1	South Carolina^{‡†}	15–1	27–1	
2	LSU^{†}	13–3	25–4	
3	Tennessee^{†}	11–5	22–7	
4	Ole Miss^{†}	10–6	22–7	1–0 vs. FLA
5	Florida^{#}	10–6	20–9	0–1 vs. MISS
6	Georgia^{#}	9–7	20–8	
7	Kentucky^{#}	8–8	15–11	
8	Arkansas^{#}	7–9	17–12	2–0 vs. MIZ
9	Missouri^{#}	7–9	18–11	0–2 vs. ARK
10	Mississippi State^{#}	6–10	15–13	1–0 vs. ALA
11	Alabama	6–10	15–12	0–1 vs. MSST
12	Texas A&M	4–12	14–14	1–0 vs. VAN
13	Vanderbilt	4–12	13–17	0–1 vs. A&M
14	Auburn	2–14	10–17	
‡ – SEC regular season champions, and tournament No. 1 seed. † – Received a double-bye in the conference tournament. # – Received a single-bye in the conference tournament. Overall records include all games played in the SEC Tournament.

== Schedule ==
Game	Time*	Matchup^{#}	Television	Attendance
First round – Wednesday, March 2
1	11:00 am	No. 12 Texas A&M 69 vs. No. 13 Vanderbilt 85	SEC Network	6,446
2	1:30 pm	No. 11 Alabama 75 vs. No. 14 Auburn 68	SEC Network	6,446
Second round – Thursday, March 3
3	Noon	No. 8 Arkansas 61 vs. No. 9 Missouri 52^{OT}	SEC Network	6,446
4	2:30 pm	No. 5 Florida 53 vs. No. 13 Vanderbilt 52	SEC Network	6,446
5	6:00 pm	No. 7 Kentucky 83 vs. No. 10 Mississippi State 67	SEC Network	6,500
6	8:30 pm	No. 6 Georgia 62 vs. No. 11 Alabama 74	SEC Network	6,500
Quarterfinals – Friday, March 4
7	Noon	No. 1 South Carolina 76 vs. No. 8 Arkansas 54	SEC Network	6,880
8	2:30 pm	No. 4 Ole Miss 70 vs. No. 5 Florida 60	SEC Network	6,880
9	6:00 pm	No. 2 LSU 63 vs. No. 7 Kentucky 78	SEC Network	7,704
10	8:30 pm	No. 3 Tennessee 74 vs. No. 11 Alabama 59	SEC Network	7,704
Semifinals – Saturday, March 5
11	4:00 pm	No. 1 South Carolina 61 vs No. 4 Ole Miss 51	ESPNU	9,072
12	6:30 pm	No. 7 Kentucky 83 vs No. 3 Tennessee 74	ESPNU	9,072
Championship – Sunday, March 6
13	1:00 pm	No. 1 South Carolina 62 vs No. 7 Kentucky 64	ESPN	7,997
*Game times in CT. # – Rankings denote tournament seed

== Bracket ==
First round Wednesday, March 2 SECN
12	Texas A&M	69
13	Vanderbilt	85
11	Alabama	75
14	Auburn	68

Second round Thursday, March 3 SECN
8	Arkansas	61
9	Missouri	52*
5	Florida	53
13	Vanderbilt	52
7	Kentucky	83
10	Mississippi State	67
6	Georgia	62
11	Alabama	74

Quarterfinals; Friday, March 4 SECN
1	South Carolina	76
8	Arkansas	54
4	Ole Miss	70
5	Florida	60
2	LSU	63
7	Kentucky	78
3	Tennessee	74
11	Alabama	59

Semifinals; Saturday, March 5 ESPNU
1	South Carolina	61
4	Ole Miss	51
7	Kentucky	83
3	Tennessee	74

Championship; Sunday, March 6 ESPN
1	South Carolina	62
7	Kentucky	64

* denotes overtime

== See also ==
- 2022 SEC men's basketball tournament
