= 2021–22 Auburn Tigers women's basketball team =

Intercollegiate basketball season

2021–22 Auburn Tigers women's basketball
- Conference: Southeastern Conference
- Record: 10–18 (2–14 SEC)
- Head coach: Johnnie Harris (1st season)
- Assistant coaches: Bob Starkey; Damitria Buchanan; Ketara Chapel
- Home arena: Auburn Arena

2021–22 SEC women's basketball standings
	Conf.				Overall
Team	W		L	PCT	W		L	PCT
No. 1 South Carolina	15	–	1	.938	35	–	2	.946
No. 9 LSU	13	–	3	.813	26	–	6	.813
No. 18 Tennessee	11	–	5	.688	25	–	9	.735
Ole Miss	10	–	6	.625	23	–	9	.719
Florida	10	–	6	.625	21	–	11	.656
Georgia	9	–	7	.563	21	–	10	.677
No. 15 Kentucky †	8	–	8	.500	19	–	12	.613
Missouri	7	–	9	.438	18	–	13	.581
Arkansas	7	–	9	.438	18	–	14	.563
Alabama	6	–	10	.375	20	–	14	.588
Mississippi State	6	–	10	.375	15	–	14	.517
Texas A&M	4	–	12	.250	14	–	15	.483
Vanderbilt	4	–	12	.250	16	–	19	.457
Auburn	2	–	14	.125	10	–	18	.357
† 2022 SEC tournament winner Rankings from AP poll

The 2021–22 Auburn Tigers women's basketball team represented Auburn University during the 2021–22 NCAA Division I women's basketball season. The Tigers, led by first-year head coach Johnnie Harris, played their home games at Auburn Arena and competed as members of the Southeastern Conference (SEC).

== Previous season ==
The Tigers finished the season 5–19 (0–15 SEC) to finish in last place in the conference. Head coach Terri Williams-Flournoy was not retained at the end of the season. Texas associate head coach Johnnie Harris was hired as her replacement on April 3, 2021.

== Offseason ==
=== Departures ===
Auburn Departures
Name	Number	Pos.	Height	Year	Hometown	Notes
Alycia Reese	0	G	5'9"	Junior	Columbus, GA	Transferred to Columbus State
Keya Patton	1	G	5'6"	Junior	Indianapolis, IN	Transferred to Arkansas State
Kira Lowery	13	G	5'6"	Junior	Memphis, TN	Transferred to North Carolina Central
Unique Thompson	20	F	6'3"	Senior	Theodore, AL	Drafted 19th overall by the Indiana Fever
Alaina Rice	22	G	5'8"	Sophomore	Rockledge, FL	Transferred to Syracuse
Morgan Robinson-Nwagwu	30	G	5'8"	Sophomore	Norcross, GA	Transferred to Gulf Coast State College

=== 2021 recruiting class ===
College recruiting information
Name	Hometown	School	Height	Weight	Commit date
Mar'shaun Bostic; G	Florissant, MO	Gateway STEM High School	5 ft 8 in (1.73 m)	N/A	
Mar'shaun Bostic; G	Recruit ratings: No ratings found				
Amoura Graves; G/F	Ponchatoula, LA	Ponchatoula High School	6 ft 0 in (1.83 m)	N/A	
Amoura Graves; G/F	Recruit ratings: No ratings found				
Overall recruit ranking:
Note: In many cases, Scout, Rivals, 247Sports, On3, and ESPN may conflict in their listings of height and weight.; In these cases, the average was taken. ESPN grades are on a 100-point scale.; Sources:

=== Incoming transfers ===
Auburn incoming transfers
Name	Number	Pos.	Height	Year	Hometown	Previous school
Xaria Wiggins	1	G	6'1"	Senior	Virginia Beach, VA	Mississippi State
Paris Mullins	15	F	6'2"	Junior	McDonough, GA	Butler Community College
Adaora Onwumelu	20	F	6'2"	RS Sophomore	Douglasville, GA	Iona
Precious Johnson	51	C	6'5"	Sophomore	Baytown, TX	Texas

== Roster ==
2021–22 Auburn Tigers women's basketball team
Players
Coaches

Pos.	#	Name	Height	Year	Previous school	Hometown
G/F	0	Amoura Graves	6 ft 0 in (1.83 m)	Fr	Ponchatoula HS	Ponchatoula, LA
G	1	Xaria Wiggins	6 ft 1 in (1.85 m)	Sr	Princess Anne HS; Mississippi State	Virginia Beach, VA
G	2	Sania Wells	5 ft 7 in (1.7 m)	Jr	East Central HS	Moss Point, MS
G	3	Annie Hughes	5 ft 9 in (1.75 m)	Jr	Pisgah HS	Dutton, AL
G	4	Riley Donahue	5 ft 10 in (1.78 m)	So	Marist School	Atlanta, GA
G	5	Aicha Coulibaly	6 ft 0 in (1.83 m)	So	IMG Academy	Bamako, Mali
F	10	Kiyae' White	6 ft 2 in (1.88 m)	RS Sr	Emmaus HS	Macungie, PA
F	11	Romi Levy	6 ft 2 in (1.88 m)	So	Hof Hasharon HS	Herzliya, Israel
G	12	Mar'shaun Bostic	5 ft 8 in (1.73 m)	Fr	Gateway STEM HS	Florissant, MO
F	14	Jala Jordan	6 ft 2 in (1.88 m)	RS Jr	IMG Academy; West Virginia	Philadelphia, PA
F	15	Paris Mullins	6 ft 2 in (1.88 m)	Jr	Henry County HS; Butler CC	McDonough, GA
F	20	Adaora Onwumelu	6 ft 2 in (1.88 m)	RS So	Lithia Springs HS; Iona	Douglasville, GA
G	23	Honesty Scott-Grayson	5 ft 9 in (1.75 m)	RS Jr	Paul VI HS; Baylor	Brick, NJ
G	24	Carsen McFadden	5 ft 7 in (1.7 m)	So	Lovejoy HS	Lucas, TX
C	51	Precious Johnson	6 ft 5 in (1.96 m)	So	Sterling HS; Texas	Baytown, TX

Head coach

- Johnnie Harris (Arkansas Baptist)

Assistant coach(es)

- Bob Starkey
- Damitria Buchanan (Texas A&M)
- Ketara Chapel (Mississippi State)

Legend

- (C) Team captain
- (S) Suspended
- (I) Ineligible
- (W) Walk-on
- Injured
- Current redshirt

Roster

== Schedule ==
Date time, TV	Rank^{#}	Opponent^{#}	Result	Record	High points	High rebounds	High assists	Site (attendance) city, state
Exhibition
November 4, 2021*; 7:00 pm		Miles	W 102–42		20 – Coulibaly	16 – White	6 – Hughes	Auburn Arena; Auburn, AL
Non-conference regular season
November 11, 2021*; 7:00 pm, SECN+		Georgia Southern	L 66–68	0–1	19 – Wells	8 – Coulibaly	5 – Wells	Auburn Arena (2,122); Auburn, AL
November 14, 2021*; 1:00 p.m., ESPN+		at Old Dominion	L 44–57	0–2	17 – Coulibaly	13 – Coulibaly	2 – Bostic	Chartway Arena (1,776); Norfolk, VA
November 16, 2021*; 7:00 pm, SECN+		Alabama State	W 74–45	1–2	21 – Scott-Grayson	10 – Scott-Grayson	7 – Wells	Auburn Arena (1,803); Auburn, AL
November 21, 2021*; 3:00 pm, ACCN		at No. 18 Georgia Tech	W 59–51	2–2	18 – Scott-Grayson	6 – Scott-Grayson	3 – Scott-Grayson	McCamish Pavilion (1,769); Atlanta, GA
November 24, 2021*; 12:00 pm, ESPN+		at Little Rock	L 49–57	2–3	11 – Wells	7 – Scott-Grayson	2 – Tied	Jack Stephens Center (656); Little Rock, AR
November 26, 2021*; 12:00 pm, SECN+		Charleston Southern	W 91–42	3–3	27 – Coulibaly	9 – Tied	6 – Scott-Grayson	Auburn Arena (2,338); Auburn, AL
November 30, 2021*; 7:00 pm, SECN+		North Florida	W 72–65	4–3	23 – Coulibaly	8 – Coulibaly	4 – Bostic	Auburn Arena (1,723); Auburn, AL
December 5, 2021*; 2:00 pm, SECN+		Oklahoma State; Big 12/SEC Challenge	W 77–66	5–3	25 – Coulibaly	6 – Tied	4 – Wells	Auburn Arena (1,873); Auburn, AL
December 12, 2021*; 2:00 pm, SECN		New Orleans	Canceled					Auburn Arena; Auburn, AL
December 15, 2021*; 7:00 pm, ESPN+		at Belmont	W 71–62	6–3	24 – Coulibaly	10 – Hughes	4 – Scott-Grayson	Curb Event Center (2,031); Nashville, TN
December 18, 2021*; 2:00 pm, SECN+		Grambling State	W 82–58	7–3	23 – Jordan	10 – Jordan	5 – Scott-Grayson	Auburn Arena (1,804); Auburn, AL
December 20, 2021*; 12:00 pm, SECN+		Kennesaw State	W 66–54	8–3	23 – Coulibaly	11 – Coulibaly	7 – Hughes	Auburn Arena (1,848); Auburn, AL
SEC regular season
January 2, 2022; 4:00 pm, SECN		at Alabama	L 53–56	8–4 (0–1)	17 – Tied	12 – Coulibaly	3 – Coulibaly	Coleman Coliseum (2,985); Tuscaloosa, AL
January 6, 2022; 7:00 pm, SECN+		at Missouri	L 63–72 ^{OT}	8–5 (0–2)	20 – Wells	9 – White	3 – Scott-Grayson	Mizzou Arena; Columbia, MO
January 9, 2022; 4:00 pm, SECN		No. 13 LSU	L 48–76	8–6 (0–3)	13 – Coulibaly	6 – Coulibaly	2 – Bostic	Auburn Arena; Auburn, AL
January 13, 2022; 5:00 pm, SECN+		at Florida	L 63–68	8–7 (0–4)	24 – Coulibaly	8 – Coulibaly	3 – Scott-Grayson	O'Connell Center; Gainesville, FL
January 16, 2022; 4:00 pm, SECN		at Texas A&M	L 53–71	8–8 (0–5)	15 – Coulibaly	9 – Coulibaly	3 – Coulibaly	Reed Arena; College Station, TX
January 23, 2022; 3:00 pm, ESPNU		Alabama	L 68–75	8–9 (0–6)	19 – Coulibaly	8 – Johnson	4 – Bostic	Auburn Arena; Auburn, AL
January 25, 2022; 7:00 pm, SECN+		Kentucky	L 55–67	8–10 (0–7)	14 – Coulibaly	11 – Coulibaly	4 – Bostic	Auburn Arena (1,780); Auburn, AL
January 27, 2022; 7:00 pm, SECN+		No. 4 Tennessee	W 71–61	9–10 (1–7)	26 – Coulibaly	7 – Coulibaly	3 – Tied	Auburn Arena (2,314); Auburn, AL
January 30, 2022; 2:00 pm, SECN+		at Vanderbilt	L 66–81	9–11 (1–8)	21 – Coulibaly	5 – Tied	4 – Tied	Memorial Gymnasium (1,767); Nashville, TN
February 3, 2022; 7:00 pm, SECN+		Mississippi State	L 65–70	9–12 (1–9)	24 – Coulibaly	5 – Tied	6 – Wells	Auburn Arena; Auburn, AL
February 10, 2022; 7:00 pm, SECN+		at Arkansas	L 66–68	9–13 (1–10)	23 – Scott-Grayson	8 – Scott-Grayson	4 – Coulibaly	Bud Walton Arena; Fayetteville, AR
February 14, 2022; 6:00 pm, SECN		No. 17 Florida	L 77–83	9–14 (1–11)	21 – Scott-Grayson	14 – Scott-Grayson	6 – Wells	Auburn Arena (1,996); Auburn, AL
February 17, 2022; 6:00 pm, SECN		at No. 1 South Carolina	L 38–75	9–15 (1–12)	9 – Coulibaly	9 – Coulibaly	2 – Bostic	Colonial Life Arena (12,574); Columbia, SC
February 20, 2022; 11:00 am, SECN		No. 21 Georgia	W 65–60	10–15 (2–12)	23 – Scott-Grayson	8 – Coulibaly	4 – Wells	Auburn Arena; Auburn, AL
February 24, 2022; 7:00 pm, SECN+		Ole Miss	L 52–72	10–16 (2–13)	13 – Scott-Grayson	6 – Scott-Grayson	4 – Bostic	Auburn Arena; Auburn, AL
February 27, 2022; 3:00 pm, SECN		at Kentucky	L 62–90	10–17 (2–14)	18 – Tied	10 – Tied	3 – Coulibaly	Memorial Colisem; Lexington, KY
SEC Tournament
March 2, 2022; SECN	(14)	vs. (11) Alabama; First Round	L 68–75	10–18	13 – Scott-Grayson	6 – Johnson	4 – Wells	Bridgestone Arena; Nashville, TN
*Non-conference game. ^{#}Rankings from AP Poll. (#) Tournament seedings in parentheses. All times are in Central Time.

== See also ==
- 2021–22 Auburn Tigers men's basketball team
