= 2021–22 Missouri Tigers women's basketball team =

Intercollegiate basketball season

2021–22 Missouri Tigers women's basketball

WNIT, First Round
- Conference: Southeastern Conference
- Record: 18–13 (7–9 SEC)
- Head coach: Robin Pingeton (12th season)
- Assistant coaches: Ashleen Bracey; Chris Bracey; Jenny Putnam
- Home arena: Mizzou Arena

2021–22 SEC women's basketball standings
	Conf.				Overall
Team	W		L	PCT	W		L	PCT
No. 1 South Carolina	15	–	1	.938	35	–	2	.946
No. 9 LSU	13	–	3	.813	26	–	6	.813
No. 18 Tennessee	11	–	5	.688	25	–	9	.735
Ole Miss	10	–	6	.625	23	–	9	.719
Florida	10	–	6	.625	21	–	11	.656
Georgia	9	–	7	.563	21	–	10	.677
No. 15 Kentucky †	8	–	8	.500	19	–	12	.613
Missouri	7	–	9	.438	18	–	13	.581
Arkansas	7	–	9	.438	18	–	14	.563
Alabama	6	–	10	.375	20	–	14	.588
Mississippi State	6	–	10	.375	15	–	14	.517
Texas A&M	4	–	12	.250	14	–	15	.483
Vanderbilt	4	–	12	.250	16	–	19	.457
Auburn	2	–	14	.125	10	–	18	.357
† 2022 SEC tournament winner Rankings from AP poll

The 2021–22 Missouri Tigers women's basketball team represented the University of Missouri during the 2021–22 NCAA Division I women's basketball season. The Tigers, led by twelfth-year head coach Robin Pingeton, played their home games at Mizzou Arena and competed as members of the Southeastern Conference (SEC).

== Previous season ==
The Tigers finished the season 9–13 (5–9 SEC) to finish in tenth place in the conference. The Tigers were invited to the 2021 Women's National Invitation Tournament where they lost to Fresno State in the first round.

== Offseason ==
=== Departures ===
Missouri Departures
Name	Number	Pos.	Height	Year	Hometown	Notes
Shannon Dufficy	5	F	6'2"	RS Senior	Melbourne, Australia	Transferred to Oregon
Nadia Green	10	G	5'10"	Senior	Chicago, IL	Graduated
Shug Dickson	12	G	5'9"	RS Senior	St. Louis, MO	Transferred to Rutgers

=== 2021 recruiting class ===
College recruiting information
Name	Hometown	School	Height	Weight	Commit date
Kiya Dorroh; F	Tucson, AZ	AZ Compass Prep School	6 ft 1 in (1.85 m)	N/A	
Kiya Dorroh; F	Recruit ratings: ESPN: (93)				
Izzy Higginbottom; G	Batesville, AR	Batesville HS	5 ft 7 in (1.70 m)	N/A	
Izzy Higginbottom; G	Recruit ratings: ESPN: (90)				
Sarah Linthacum; F	Jefferson City, MO	Jefferson City HS	6 ft 3 in (1.91 m)	N/A	
Sarah Linthacum; F	Recruit ratings: No ratings found				
Da'Necia Trusty; F	Houston, TX	Alief Hastings HS	6 ft 3 in (1.91 m)	N/A	
Da'Necia Trusty; F	Recruit ratings: No ratings found				
Overall recruit ranking:
Note: In many cases, Scout, Rivals, 247Sports, On3, and ESPN may conflict in their listings of height and weight.; In these cases, the average was taken. ESPN grades are on a 100-point scale.; Sources:

=== Incoming transfer ===
Missouri Incoming Transfer
Name	Number	Pos.	Height	Year	Hometown	Previous school
Skylah Travis	25	F	6'3"	RS Freshman	Weldon, NC	Old Dominion

== Roster ==
2021–22 Missouri Tigers women's basketball team
Players
Coaches

Pos.	#	Name	Height	Year	Previous school	Hometown
F	0	LaDazhia Williams	6 ft 4 in (1.93 m)	RS Sr	Lakewood Ranch HS; South Carolina	Bradenton, FL
G	1	Lauren Hansen	5 ft 8 in (1.73 m)	Jr	Ward Melville HS; Auburn	Long Island, NY
G	2	Sara-Rose Smith	6 ft 1 in (1.85 m)	So	BA Centre of Excellence	Melbourne, Australia
G	4	Mama Dembele	5 ft 6 in (1.68 m)	So	IES Joaquim Blume	Manlleu, Spain
G	13	Haley Troup	5 ft 10 in (1.78 m)	RS Sr	Gadsden City HS	Gadsden, AL
F	20	Sarah Linthacum	6 ft 3 in (1.91 m)	Fr	Jefferson City HS	Jefferson City, MO
F	24	Kiya Dorroh	6 ft 1 in (1.85 m)	Fr	AZ Compass Prep School	Tucson, AZ
F	25	Skylah Travis	6 ft 3 in (1.91 m)	RS Fr	Weldon HS; Old Dominion	Weldon, NC
G	30	Izzy Higginbottom	5 ft 7 in (1.7 m)	Fr	Batesville HS	Batesville, AR
C	32	Jayla Kelly	6 ft 3 in (1.91 m)	So	Parkway Central HS	Chesterfield, MO
G	33	Aijha Blackwell	6 ft 0 in (1.83 m)	Jr	Cardinal Ritter College Prep HS	Berkeley, MO
F	34	Da'Necia Trusty	6 ft 3 in (1.91 m)	Fr	Alief Hastings HS	Houston, TX
F	40	Micah Linthacum	6 ft 4 in (1.93 m)	RS So	Jefferson City HS	Jefferson City, MO
F	43	Hayley Frank	6 ft 1 in (1.85 m)	Jr	Strafford HS	Strafford, MO

Head coach

- Robin Pingeton (St. Ambrose)

Assistant coach(es)

- Ashleen Bracey (Illinois State)
- Chris Bracey (West Texas A&M)
- Jenny Putnam (St. Ambrose)

Legend

- (C) Team captain
- (S) Suspended
- (I) Ineligible
- (W) Walk-on
- Injured
- Current redshirt

Roster

== Schedule ==
Date time, TV	Rank^{#}	Opponent^{#}	Result	Record	High points	High rebounds	High assists	Site (attendance) city, state
Exhibition
October 28, 2021*; 7:00 pm		Lindenwood	W 87–39		19 – Frank	8 – Frank	5 – Hansen	Mizzou Arena (625); Columbia, MO
November 4, 2021*; 7:00 pm		Southwest Baptist	W 90–35		21 – Blackwell	10 – Blackwell	8 – Troup	Mizzou Arena; Columbia, MO
Non-conference regular season
November 11, 2021*; 7:00 pm, SECN+		Murray State	W 76–70	1–0	19 – Blackwell	15 – Blackwell	5 – Troup	Mizzou Arena; Columbia, MO
November 14, 2021*; 2:00 pm, SECN+		Morgan State	W 73–49	2–0	20 – Tied	13 – Blackwell	5 – Tied	Mizzou Arena; Columbia, MO
November 17, 2021*; 7:00 pm, ESPN+		at Saint Louis	W 69–53	3–0	17 – Higginbottom	14 – Blackwell	4 – Dembele	Chaifetz Arena; St. Louis, MO
November 21, 2021*; 2:00 pm, SECN+		Idaho State	W 75–47	4–0	18 – Higginbottom	9 – Blackwell	5 – Dembele	Mizzou Arena; Columbia, MO
November 23, 2021*; 7:00 pm, SECN		Troy	W 76–63	5–0	20 – Tied	18 – Blackwell	3 – Tied	Mizzou Arena (2,353); Columbia, MO
November 27, 2021*; 2:30 pm		vs. Columbia; Christmas City Classic	W 87–80	6–0	29 – Frank	8 – Frank	6 – Higginbottom	Stabler Arena (576); Bethlehem, PA
November 28, 2021*		at Lehigh; Christmas City Classic	W 88–67	7–0	34 – Hansen	7 – Tied	7 – Troup	Stabler Arena; Bethlehem, PA
December 2, 2021*; 7:00 pm, SECN+		SIU Edwardsville	W 79–46	8–0	16 – Tied	15 – Blackwell	8 – Dembele	Mizzou Arena; Columbia, MO
December 4, 2021*; 7:00 pm, ESPNU		at No. 5 Baylor; Big 12/SEC Challenge	L 68–70	8–1	20 – Blackwell	16 – Blackwell	6 – Troup	Ferrell Center; Waco, TX
December 10, 2021*; 7:00 pm, ESPN+		at Missouri State	L 51–79	8–2	12 – Frank	5 – Tied	3 – Dembele	JQH Arena (5,288); Springfield, MO
December 12, 2021*; 2:00 pm, SECN+		Alabama A&M	W 69–55	9–2	20 – Blackwell	20 – Blackwell	4 – Dembele	Mizzou Arena; Columbia, MO
December 20, 2021*; 7:00 pm, SECN+		Southern	W 73–54	10–2	21 – Frank	12 – Blackwell	5 – Troup	Mizzou Arena; Columbia, MO
December 22, 2021*; 12:00 pm, BTN+		at Illinois	W 84–65	11–2	18 – Blackwell	15 – Blackwell	3 – Tied	State Farm Center; Champaign, IL
SEC regular season
December 30, 2021; 6:00 pm, SECN		No. 1 South Carolina	W 70–69 ^{OT}	12–2 (1–0)	21 – Tied	12 – Williams	4 – Troup	Mizzou Arena (6,139); Columbia, MO
January 6, 2022; 7:00 pm, SECN+		Auburn	W 72–63 ^{OT}	13–2 (2–0)	25 – Williams	14 – Blackwell	5 – Dembele	Mizzou Arena; Columbia, MO
January 9, 2022; 2:00 pm, SECN+		at Arkansas	L 73–83	13–3 (2–1)	22 – Frank	14 – Blackwell	5 – Dembele	Bud Walton Arena; Fayetteville, AR
January 13, 2022; 7:00 pm, SECN+		at No. 12 LSU	L 85–87 ^{OT}	13–4 (2–2)	26 – Blackwell	16 – Blackwell	5 – Troup	Pete Maravich Assembly Center; Baton Rouge, LA
January 17, 2022; 6:00 pm, SECN		No. 13 Georgia	L 62–72	13–5 (2–3)	27 – Blackwell	13 – Blackwell	3 – Blackwell	Mizzou Arena; Columbia, MO
January 20, 2022; 7:00 pm, SECN+		at Vanderbilt	W 66–52	14–5 (3–3)	15 – Hansen	17 – Blackwell	5 – Dembele	Memorial Gymnasium; Nashville, TN
January 23, 2022; 5:00 pm, SECN		Texas A&M	W 78–69	15–5 (4–3)	28 – Frank	14 – Blackwell	7 – Dembele	Mizzou Arena; Columbia, MO
January 27, 2022; 5:30 pm, SECN		at Mississippi State	L 62–77	15–6 (4–4)	17 – Blackwell	16 – Blackwell	5 – Blackwell	Humphrey Coliseum; Starkville, MS
January 30, 2022; 5:00 pm, SECN		at Alabama	W 77–61	16–6 (5–4)	18 – Williams	11 – Blackwell	6 – Dembele	Coleman Coliseum; Tuscaloosa, AL
February 3, 2022; 4:00 pm, SECN		Ole Miss	L 45–61	16–7 (5–5)	24 – Williams	10 – Blackwell	2 – Troup	Mizzou Arena; Columbia, MO
February 10, 2022; 5:30 pm, SECN		at No. 13 Tennessee	L 62–76	16–8 (5–6)	22 – Hansen	10 – Blackwell	5 – Dembele	Thompson–Boling Arena; Knoxville, TN
February 13, 2022; 2:00 pm, SECN+		Arkansas	L 71–88	16–9 (5–7)	21 – Frank	12 – Blackwell	3 – Tied	Mizzou Arena; Columbia, MO
February 17, 2022; 6:00 pm, SECN+		at No. 21 Georgia	L 49–74	16–10 (5–8)	10 – Tied	5 – Kelly	4 – Smith	Stegeman Coliseum; Athens, GA
February 20, 2022; 2:00 pm, SECN+		Mississippi State	W 76–66	17–10 (6–8)	19 – Frank	18 – Blackwell	6 – Dembele	Mizzou Arena; Columbia, MO
February 24, 2022; 7:00 pm, SECN+		Kentucky	L 63–78	17–11 (6–9)	16 – Frank	5 – Tied	5 – Dembele	Mizzou Arena; Columbia, MO
February 27, 2022; 11:00 am, SECN		at No. 15 Florida	W 78–73	18–11 (7–9)	26 – Frank	10 – Frank	3 – Tied	O'Connell Center; Gainesville, FL
SEC Tournament
March 3, 2022; 12:00 pm, SECN	(9)	vs. (8) Arkansas; Second Round	L 52–61 ^{OT}	18–12	21 – Troup	13 – Williams	3 – Troup	Bridgestone Arena; Nashville, TN
WNIT
March 17, 2022; 7:00 pm, SECN+		Drake; First Round	L 78–83 ^{OT}	18–13	27 – Blackwell	10 – Blackwell	4 – Frank	Mizzou Arena; Columbia, MO
*Non-conference game. ^{#}Rankings from AP Poll. (#) Tournament seedings in parentheses. All times are in Central Time.

== See also ==
- 2021–22 Missouri Tigers men's basketball team
