= 2021–22 Georgia Lady Bulldogs basketball team =

Intercollegiate basketball season

2021–22 Georgia Lady Bulldogs basketball

NCAA tournament, second round
- Conference: Southeastern Conference

Ranking
- Coaches: No. 25
- Record: 21–10 (9–7 SEC)
- Head coach: Joni Taylor (7th season)
- Assistant coaches: Karen Lange; Robert Mosley; Chelsea Newton
- Home arena: Stegeman Coliseum

2021–22 SEC women's basketball standings
	Conf.				Overall
Team	W		L	PCT	W		L	PCT
No. 1 South Carolina	15	–	1	.938	35	–	2	.946
No. 9 LSU	13	–	3	.813	26	–	6	.813
No. 18 Tennessee	11	–	5	.688	25	–	9	.735
Ole Miss	10	–	6	.625	23	–	9	.719
Florida	10	–	6	.625	21	–	11	.656
Georgia	9	–	7	.563	21	–	10	.677
No. 15 Kentucky †	8	–	8	.500	19	–	12	.613
Missouri	7	–	9	.438	18	–	13	.581
Arkansas	7	–	9	.438	18	–	14	.563
Alabama	6	–	10	.375	20	–	14	.588
Mississippi State	6	–	10	.375	15	–	14	.517
Texas A&M	4	–	12	.250	14	–	15	.483
Vanderbilt	4	–	12	.250	16	–	19	.457
Auburn	2	–	14	.125	10	–	18	.357
† 2022 SEC tournament winner Rankings from AP poll

The 2021–22 Georgia Lady Bulldogs basketball team represented the University of Georgia during the 2021–22 NCAA Division I women's basketball season. The Lady Bulldogs, led by seventh-year head coach Joni Taylor, played their home games at Stegeman Coliseum and competed as members of the Southeastern Conference (SEC).

== Previous season ==
The Lady Bulldogs finished the season 21–7 (10–5 SEC) to finish in fourth in the conference. The Lady Bulldogs were invited to the 2021 NCAA Division I women's basketball tournament where they defeated Drexel in the First Round before losing to Oregon in the Second Round.

== Offseason ==
=== Departures ===
Georgia Departures
Name	Number	Pos.	Height	Year	Hometown	Notes
Gabby Connally	2	G	5'6"	Senior	San Antonio, TX	Graduated
Caitlin Hose	10	G	5'9"	Junior	Hazel Green, AL	Transferred to Indiana
Maya Caldwell	11	G	5'11"	Senior	Charlotte, NC	Drafted 33rd overall by the Indiana Fever

=== 2021 recruiting class ===
College recruiting information
Name	Hometown	School	Height	Weight	Commit date
Reigan Richardson; G	Charlotte, NC	Cannon School	5 ft 11 in (1.80 m)	N/A	
Reigan Richardson; G	Recruit ratings: ESPN: (94)				
Jillian Hollingshead; F	Powder Springs, GA	McEachern HS	6 ft 5 in (1.96 m)	N/A	
Jillian Hollingshead; F	Recruit ratings: ESPN: (93)				
Kimora Jenkins; G	Long Island, NY	Millbrook HS	6 ft 1 in (1.85 m)	N/A	
Kimora Jenkins; G	Recruit ratings: No ratings found				
Alina Sendar; G	Amsterdam, Netherlands	Orange Lions Academy	5 ft 11 in (1.80 m)	N/A	
Alina Sendar; G	Recruit ratings: No ratings found				
Overall recruit ranking:
Note: In many cases, Scout, Rivals, 247Sports, On3, and ESPN may conflict in their listings of height and weight.; In these cases, the average was taken. ESPN grades are on a 100-point scale.; Sources:

== Roster ==
2021–22 Georgia Lady Bulldogs women's basketball team
Players
Coaches

Pos.	#	Name	Height	Year	Previous school	Hometown
F	0	Zoesha Smith	6 ft 1 in (1.85 m)	So	Glynn Academy	Brunswick, GA
G	1	Chloe Chapman	5 ft 7 in (1.7 m)	Jr	Our Lady of Good Counsel HS	Mitchellville, MD
G	3	Sarah Ashlee Barker	6 ft 0 in (1.83 m)	So	Spain Park HS	Birmingham, AL
G	4	Mikayla Coombs	5 ft 9 in (1.75 m)	RS Sr	Wesleyan School; UConn	Buford, GA
C	14	Jenna Staiti	6 ft 4 in (1.93 m)	RS Sr	West Forsyth HS; Maryland	Cumming, GA
C	15	Maori Davenport	6 ft 4 in (1.93 m)	Jr	Charles Henderson HS; Rutgers	Troy, AL
F	20	Jordan Isaacs	6 ft 0 in (1.83 m)	Jr	St. Francis School	Alpharetta, GA
G	21	Reigan Richardson	5 ft 11 in (1.8 m)	Fr	Cannon School	Charlotte, NC
F	22	Malury Bates	6 ft 3 in (1.91 m)	RS Sr	William Fleming HS	Roanoke, VA
G	23	Que Morrison	5 ft 7 in (1.7 m)	RS Sr	McEachern HS	Riverdale, GA
G	24	Kimora Jenkins	6 ft 1 in (1.85 m)	Fr	Millbrook HS	Long Island, NY
G	31	Alina Sendar	5 ft 11 in (1.8 m)	Fr	Orange Lions Academy	Amsterdam, Netherlands
F	35	Javyn Nicholson	6 ft 2 in (1.88 m)	Jr	Collins Hill HS	Lawrenceville, GA
F	53	Jillian Hollingshead	6 ft 5 in (1.96 m)	Fr	McEachern HS	Powder Springs, GA

Head coach

- Joni Taylor (Alabama)

Assistant coach(es)

- Karen Lange (Iowa)
- Chelsea Newton (Rutgers)
- Robert Mosley (Miles)

Legend

- (C) Team captain
- (S) Suspended
- (I) Ineligible
- (W) Walk-on
- Injured
- Current redshirt

Roster

== Schedule ==
Date time, TV	Rank^{#}	Opponent^{#}	Result	Record	High points	High rebounds	High assists	Site (attendance) city, state
Non-conference regular season
November 11, 2021*; 7:00 pm, SECN+		Gardner–Webb	W 97–45	1–0	16 – Staiti	12 – Nicholson	4 – Tied	Stegeman Coliseum (2,096); Athens, GA
November 15, 2021*; 7:00 pm, SECN+		Furman	W 78–41	2–0	19 – Barker	7 – Coombs	7 – Coombs	Stegeman Coliseum (1,760); Athens, GA
November 18, 2021*; 7:00 pm, SECN+		Mercer	W 67–52	3–0	13 – Staiti	12 – Staiti	4 – Coombs	Stegeman Coliseum (1,831); Athens, GA
November 21, 2021*; 2:00 pm, SECN+		Alabama State	W 73–43	4–0	16 – Richardson	13 – Nicholson	4 – Tied	Stegeman Coliseum (2,009); Athens, GA
November 26, 2021*; 4:30 pm		vs. Notre Dame; Daytona Beach Invitational	W 71–67 ^{OT}	5–0	16 – Staiti	9 – Staiti	7 – Morrison	Ocean Center; Daytona Beach, FL
November 27, 2021*; 2:15 pm		vs. Marquette; Daytona Beach Invitational	W 70–45	6–0	13 – Tied	7 – Bates	6 – Morrison	Ocean Center; Daytona Beach, FL
December 2, 2021*; 1:00 pm, ESPNU	No. 20	at Texas Tech; Big 12/SEC Challenge	W 66–56	7–0	20 – Morrison	9 – Staiti	4 – Morrison	United Supermarkets Arena (8,163); Lubbock, TX
December 5, 2021*; 12:00 pm, SECN	No. 20	Georgia Tech	L 54–55	7–1	15 – Morrison	8 – Nicholson	4 – Morrison	Stegeman Coliseum (3,220); Athens, GA
December 8, 2021*; 12:00 pm, SECN+	No. 21	North Florida	W 69–40	8–1	17 – Staiti	11 – Morrison	4 – Chapman	Stegeman Coliseum (1,868); Athens, GA
December 16, 2021*; 12:00 pm, ESPNU	No. 17	at No. 2 NC State	W 82–80 ^{OT}	9–1	21 – Staiti	11 – Staiti	6 – Morrison	Reynolds Coliseum (4,012); Raleigh, NC
December 19, 2021*; 2:00 pm, SECN+	No. 17	Saint Francis (PA)	W 82–45	10–1	16 – Staiti	7 – Nicholson	6 – Richardson	Stegeman Coliseum (2,354); Athens, GA
December 21, 2021*; 12:00 pm, SECN	No. 13т	South Alabama	W 89–50	11–1	17 – Staiti	8 – Barker	5 – Tied	Stegeman Coliseum (2,082); Athens, GA
SEC regular season
December 30, 2021; 7:00 pm, SECN+	No. 13	No. 19 LSU	L 62–68	11–2 (0–1)	26 – Morrison	7 – Tied	10 – Morrison	Stegeman Coliseum (3,241); Athens, GA
January 2, 2022; 3:00 pm, SECN	No. 13	at Florida	W 73–69	12–2 (1–1)	18 – Morrison	6 – Tied	5 – Chapman	O'Connell Center (1,119); Gainesville, FL
January 6, 2022; 7:00 pm, SECN+	No. 15	at No. 21 Kentucky	L 76–84	12–3 (1–2)	26 – Staiti	8 – Tied	6 – Morrison	Memorial Coliseum (3,013); Lexington, KY
January 9, 2022; 3:00 pm, SECN	No. 15	Alabama	W 72–68	13–3 (2–2)	21 – Morrison	9 – Staiti	6 – Morrison	Stegeman Coliseum (3,453); Athens, GA
January 17, 2022; 7:00 pm, SECN	No. 13	at Missouri	W 72–62	14–3 (3–2)	22 – Staiti	12 – Staiti	6 – Morrison	Mizzou Arena (3,752); Columbia, MO
January 20, 2022; 7:00 pm, SECN+	No. 13	at Mississippi State	W 66–63	15–3 (4–2)	14 – Morrison	10 – Staiti	3 – Tied	Humphrey Coliseum (4,961); Starkville, MS
January 23, 2022; 2:00 pm, SECN	No. 13	No. 5 Tennessee	L 55–63	15–4 (4–3)	16 – Staiti	6 – Tied	3 – Tied	Stegeman Coliseum (5,117); Athens, GA
January 30, 2022; 3:00 pm, SECN+	No. 15	at No. 24 Ole Miss	W 62–52	16–4 (5–3)	22 – Staiti	11 – Staiti	5 – Tied	SJB Pavilion (3,333); Oxford, MS
February 3, 2022; 7:00 pm, SECN+	No. 14	Vanderbilt	W 71–56	17–4 (6–3)	16 – Staiti	9 – Nicholson	5 – Morrison	Stegeman Coliseum (2,254); Athens, GA
February 6, 2022; 1:00 pm, SECN	No. 14	Florida	L 51–54	17–5 (6–4)	13 – Bates	8 – Staiti	5 – Morrison	Stegeman Coliseum (3,653); Athens, GA
February 10, 2022; 8:30 pm, SECN	No. 17	at No. 14 LSU	L 67–73	17–6 (6–5)	17 – Richardson	7 – Nicholson	6 – Morrison	Pete Maravich Assembly Center (6,943); Baton Rouge, LA
February 13, 2022; 12:00 pm, ESPN2	No. 17	No. 1 South Carolina	L 54–72	17–7 (6–6)	15 – Staiti	10 – Staiti	3 – Tied	Stegeman Coliseum (5,461); Athens, GA
February 17, 2022; 7:00 pm, SECN+	No. 21	Missouri	W 74–49	18–7 (7–6)	22 – Staiti	9 – Tied	4 – Morrison	Stegeman Coliseum (2,295); Athens, GA
February 20, 2022; 12:00 pm, SECN	No. 21	at Auburn	L 60–65	18–8 (7–7)	18 – Staiti	7 – Tied	4 – Nicholson	Auburn Arena (2,906); Auburn, AL
February 24, 2022; 8:00 pm, SECN+	No. 25	at Arkansas	W 63–62	19–8 (8–7)	15 – Richardson	7 – Staiti	4 – Chapman	Bud Walton Arena (2,726); Fayetteville, AR
February 27, 2022; 2:00 pm, SECN+	No. 25	Texas A&M	W 67–58	20–8 (9–7)	17 – Staiti	10 – Staiti	4 – Coombs	Stegeman Coliseum (3,079); Athens, GA
SEC Tournament
March 3, 2022; 9:30 pm, SECN	(6) No. 24	vs. (11) Alabama; Second Round	L 62–74	20–9	18 – Morrison	9 – Nicholson	7 – Coombs	Bridgestone Arena (6,500); Nashville, TN
NCAA tournament
March 18, 2022; 7:30 pm, ESPNews	(6 G)	vs. (11 G) Dayton; First Round	W 70–54	21–9	19 – Staiti	8 – Tied	7 – Morrison	Hilton Coliseum; Ames, IA
March 20, 2022; 8:00 pm, ESPN2	(6 G)	at (3 G) No. 10 Iowa State; Second Round	L 44–67	21–10	16 – Staiti	9 – Staiti	4 – Chapman	Hilton Coliseum (6,283); Ames, IA
*Non-conference game. ^{#}Rankings from AP Poll. (#) Tournament seedings in parentheses. All times are in Eastern Time.

== See also ==
- 2021–22 Georgia Bulldogs basketball team
