= 2021–22 DePaul Blue Demons women's basketball team =

Intercollegiate basketball season

2021–22 DePaul Blue Demons women's basketball
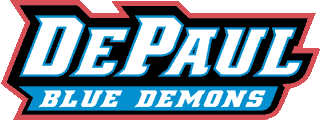

NCAA tournament, First Four
- Conference: Big East Conference
- Record: 22–11 (14–6 Big East)
- Head coach: Doug Bruno (36th season)
- Assistant coaches: Jill M. Pizzotti; Candis Blankson; Lisa Ryckbosch
- Home arena: Wintrust Arena

2021–22 Big East women's basketball standings
	Conf.				Overall
Team	W		L	PCT	W		L	PCT
No. 5 UConn †	16	–	1	.941	30	–	6	.833
Villanova	15	–	4	.789	24	–	9	.727
Creighton	15	–	5	.750	23	–	10	.697
DePaul	14	–	6	.700	22	–	11	.667
Marquette	13	–	7	.650	23	–	11	.676
Seton Hall	12	–	8	.600	24	–	13	.649
St. John's	7	–	12	.368	12	–	19	.387
Providence	6	–	14	.300	11	–	19	.367
Georgetown	4	–	15	.211	10	–	19	.345
Xavier	4	–	16	.200	9	–	21	.300
Butler	0	–	18	.000	1	–	27	.036
† 2022 Big East tournament winner Rankings from AP poll

The 2021–22 DePaul Blue Demons women's basketball team represented DePaul University during the 2021–22 NCAA Division I women's basketball season. The Blue Demons were led by thirty-sixth year head coach Doug Bruno and played their home games at the Wintrust Arena as members of the Big East Conference.

== Previous season ==
DePaul finished the 2020–21 season 14–10, 11–5 in Big East play to finish in fourth place. As the fourth seed in the Big East tournament they lost in the Quarterfinals to Villanova. They received an at-large invitation to the WNIT, where they played in the Rockford Regional. They lost in the First Round to Saint Louis and lost their consolation game to Drake.

== Roster ==
2021–22 DePaul Blue Demons women's basketball team
Players
Coaches

Pos.	#	Name	Height	Year	Previous school	Hometown
G	1	Keke Rimmer	5 ft 10 in (1.78 m)	Jr	Proviso East	Maywood, IL
G	3	Deja Church	5 ft 10 in (1.78 m)	GS	Southfield A&T; Michigan	Southfield, MI
G	4	Kierra Collier	5 ft 6 in (1.68 m)	Jr	Blue Valley North	Lee Summit, MO
G	10	Lexi Held	5 ft 10 in (1.78 m)	Sr	Cooper	Burlington, KY
G	11	Sonya Morris	5 ft 10 in (1.78 m)	Sr	Incarnate Word	St. Louis, MO
F	14	Hannah Purcell	6 ft 0 in (1.83 m)	Jr	Annandale	Annandale, MN
G	21	Darrione Rogers	5 ft 11 in (1.8 m)	So	Lake Park West	Roselle, IL
F	22	Kayla Caudle	6 ft 1 in (1.85 m)	Jr	Vernon Hills	Vernon Hills, IL
G	23	Dee Bekelja	5 ft 8 in (1.73 m)	GS	Solon	Solon, OH
F	24	Aneesah Morrow	6 ft 1 in (1.85 m)	Fr	Simeon	Chicago, IL
F	25	Kaitlyn Ammons	6 ft 3 in (1.91 m)	Fr	Morgantown	Wana, WV
F	33	Jorie Allen	6 ft 1 in (1.85 m)	Jr	North Lawrence	Bedford, IN
G	35	Kendall Holmes	5 ft 11 in (1.8 m)	So	Benet Academy	Plainfield, IL

Head coach

- Doug Bruno (DePaul)

Assistant coach(es)

- Jill M. Pizzotti (Southeast Missouri State)
- Candis Blankson (DePaul)
- Lisa Ryckbosch (Georgetown)

Legend

- (C) Team captain
- (S) Suspended
- (I) Ineligible
- (W) Walk-on
- Injured
- Current redshirt

Roster
Last update: January 30, 2022

== Schedule ==
Date time, TV	Rank^{#}	Opponent^{#}	Result	Record	High points	High rebounds	High assists	Site (attendance) city, state
Exhibition
November 3, 2021*; 5:00 pm		Lewis University; Exhibition	W 104–65	0–0 (0–0)	21 – Morrow	20 – Morrow	8 – Rogers	Wintrust Arena (207); Chicago, IL
Regular season
November 9, 2021*; 7:00 pm		Texas Southern	W 114–71	1–0 (0–0)	31 – Morrow	9 – Morrow	7 – Held	Wintrust Arena (929); Chicago, IL
November 12, 2021*; 7:00 pm		Loyola Chicago; Red Line Rivalry	W 87–53	2–0 (0–0)	23 – Morris	11 – Rogers	8 – Held	Wintrust Arena (1097); Chicago, IL
November 15, 2021*; 7:00 pm, SECN		at No. 17 Texas A&M	L 75–95	2–1 (0–0)	19 – Held	14 – Rogers	4 – Morris	Reed Arena (2922); College Station, TX
November 21, 2021*; 5:00 pm		Northwestern	W 78–75	3–1 (0–0)	20 – Morris	17 – Morrow	8 – Held	Wintrust Arena (1140); Chicago, IL
November 25, 2021*; Noon, ESPN3		vs. Rutgers; Paradise Jam Quarterfinals	W 77–74	4–1 (0–0)	16 – Held	9 – Rogers	5 – Held	UVI Sports and Fitness Center; St. Thomas, USVI
November 26, 2021*; 2:15 pm, ESPN3		vs. No. 12 Arizona; Paradise Jam Semifinals	L 68–75	5–2 (0–0)	24 – Morrow	16 – Morrow	4 – Tied	UVI Sports and Fitness Center; St. Thomas, USVI
November 27, 2021*; Noon, ESPN3		vs. Vanderbilt; Paradise Jam Consolation	W 91–74	6–2 (0–0)	36 – Morris	15 – Morrow	5 – Held	UVI Sports and Fitness Center; St. Thomas, USVI
December 3, 2021; 7:00 pm		Butler Bulldogs	W 101–64	7–2 (1–0)	19 – Church	6 – Morrow	5 – Tied	Wintrust Arena (1036); Chicago, IL
December 5, 2021; 5:00 pm		Xavier Musketeers	W 103–85	8–2 (2–0)	24 – Morrow	19 – Morrow	6 – Morris	Wintrust Arena (868); Chicago, IL
December 9, 2021*; 6:00 pm, SECN		at No. 14 Kentucky	W 94–85	9–2 (2–0)	20 – Church	17 – Morrow	11 – Held	Rupp Arena (4906); Lexington, KY
December 14, 2021*; 11:00 am		Nicholls State	W 100–72	10–2 (2–0)	21 – Morris	10 – Morrow	5 – Held	Wintrust Arena (2339); Chicago, IL
December 16, 2021*; 7:00 pm		Northern Illinois	W 103–71	11–2 (2–0)	20 – Rogers	15 – Morrow	10 – Morris	Wintrust Arena (812); Chicago, IL
December 19, 2021; Noon		at St. John's Red Storm	W 107–93	11–2 (3–0)	35 – Morris	19 – Morrow	7 – Rogers	Carnesecca Arena (438); Queens, NY
December 22, 2021*; 7:30 pm, FS1		Notre Dame	L 86–91	11–3 (3–0)	19 – Morrow	10 – Morrow	4 – Held	Wintrust Arena (1904); Chicago, IL
January 7, 2022; 6:00 pm		at Providence Friars	W 98–77	12–3 (4–0)	20 – Church	10 – Morrow	8 – Held	Alumni Hall (203); Providence, RI
January 12, 2022; 7:00 pm		at Marquette Golden Eagles	L 85–88 ^{OT}	12–4 (4–1)	21 – Morrow	17 – Morrow	5 – Held	Al McGuire Center (1227); Milwaukee, WI
January 14, 2022; 5:30 pm		Villanova Wildcats	W 75–63	13–4 (5–1)	25 – Morris	11 – Morrow	2 – Tied	Wintrust Arena (819); Chicago, IL
January 16, 2022; 2:00 pm, BEDN		Georgetown Hoyas	W 102–69	14–4 (6–1)	23 – Morrow	14 – Morrow	5 – Rogers	Wintrust Arena (973); Chicago, IL
January 21, 2022; 6:00 pm		at Butler Bulldogs	W 103–69	15–4 (7–1)	33 – Morrow	15 – Morrow	9 – Held	Hinkle Fieldhouse (607); Indianapolis, IN
January 23, 2022; 1:00 pm, CBSSN		at Xavier Musketeers	W 94–74	16–4 (8–1)	32 – Morrow	15 – Morrow	8 – Held	Cintas Center (647); Cincinnati, OH
January 26, 2022; 7:00 pm, SNY		No. 10 UConn Huskies	L 78–80	16–5 (8–2)	30 – Morrow	14 – Morrow	5 – Rogers	Wintrust Arena (1989); Chicago, IL
January 28, 2022; 6:00 pm, FS1		St. John's Red Storm; Blue Demon Day	W 94–88	17–5 (9–2)	24 – Held	18 – Morrow	8 – Held	Wintrust Arena (992); Chicago, IL
January 30, 2022; 4:30 pm, FS1		at Seton Hall Pirates	W 85–65	18–5 (10–2)	26 – Morris	27 – Morrow	7 – Held	Walsh Gymnasium (933); South Orange, NJ
February 4, 2022; 7:00 pm		Creighton Bluejays	L 68–77	18–6 (10–3)	21 – Morrow	12 – Morrow	4 – Held	Wintrust Arena (949); Chicago, IL
February 6, 2022; 2:00 pm		Providence Friars	W 88–67	19–6 (11–3)	20 – Church	14 – Morrow	9 – Held	Wintrust Arena (1313); Chicago, IL
February 11, 2022; 6:00 pm, SNY		at No. 8 UConn Huskies	L 60–84	19–7 (11–4)	20 – Morrow	16 – Morrow	5 – Church	Gampel Pavilion (8115); Storrs, CT
February 13, 2022; 1:00 pm, BEDN		at Georgetown Hoyas	W 105–104 ^{2OT}	20–7 (12–4)	28 – Morrow	18 – Morrow	5 – Held	McDonough Arena (203); Washington, D.C.
February 16, 2022; 7:00 pm		Marquette Golden Eagles; Play4Kay Game	W 77–66	21–7 (13–4)	23 – Church	17 – Morrow	4 – Morris	Wintrust Arena (1038); Chicago, IL
February 20, 2022; 1:00 pm		at Villanova Wildcats	L 64–73	21–8 (13–5)	23 – Morrow	15 – Morrow	2 – Tied	Finneran Pavilion (2771); Villanova, PA
February 25, 2022; 7:00 pm		Seton Hall Pirates; Senior Day	L 90–94	21–9 (13–6)	28 – Morris	15 – Morrow	7 – Held	Wintrust Arena (1219); Chicago, IL
February 27, 2022; 11:00 am		at Creighton Bluejays	W 90–84	22–9 (14–6)	41 – Morrow	18 – Morrow	4 – Tied	D.J. Sokol Arena (1049); Omaha, NE
Big East Women's Tournament
March 5, 2022; 2:30 pm	(4)	vs. (5) Marquette Golden Eagles	L 85–105	22–10 (14–6)	29 – Morrow	6 – Morrow	4 – Church	Mohegan Sun Arena; Uncasville, Connecticut
NCAA tournament
March 16, 2022; 8:00 pm, ESPNU	(11)	vs. (11) Dayton Flyers	L 57–88	22–11	28 – Morrow	17 – Morrow	2 – Tied	Hilton Coliseum (436); Ames, Iowa
*Non-conference game. ^{#}Rankings from AP Poll. (#) Tournament seedings in parentheses. All times are in Central Time.

== See also ==
- 2021–22 DePaul Blue Demons men's basketball team
