= 2021–22 Florida Gators women's basketball team =

Intercollegiate basketball season

2021–22 Florida Gators women's basketball

NCAA tournament, first round
- Conference: Southeastern Conference
- Record: 21–11 (10–6 SEC)
- Head coach: Kelly Rae Finley (1st season)
- Assistant coaches: Julian Assibey; Erika Lang-Montgomery; Julie Plank
- Home arena: O'Connell Center

2021–22 SEC women's basketball standings
	Conf.				Overall
Team	W		L	PCT	W		L	PCT
No. 1 South Carolina	15	–	1	.938	35	–	2	.946
No. 9 LSU	13	–	3	.813	26	–	6	.813
No. 18 Tennessee	11	–	5	.688	25	–	9	.735
Ole Miss	10	–	6	.625	23	–	9	.719
Florida	10	–	6	.625	21	–	11	.656
Georgia	9	–	7	.563	21	–	10	.677
No. 15 Kentucky †	8	–	8	.500	19	–	12	.613
Missouri	7	–	9	.438	18	–	13	.581
Arkansas	7	–	9	.438	18	–	14	.563
Alabama	6	–	10	.375	20	–	14	.588
Mississippi State	6	–	10	.375	15	–	14	.517
Texas A&M	4	–	12	.250	14	–	15	.483
Vanderbilt	4	–	12	.250	16	–	19	.457
Auburn	2	–	14	.125	10	–	18	.357
† 2022 SEC tournament winner Rankings from AP poll

The 2021–22 Florida Gators women's basketball team represented the University of Florida during the 2021–22 NCAA Division I women's basketball season. The Gators, led by first-year head coach Kelly Rae Finley, played their home games at the O'Connell Center and competed as members of the Southeastern Conference (SEC).

== Previous season ==
The Gators finished the season 12–14 (3–11 SEC) to finish in twelfth place in the conference. The Gators were invited to the 2021 Women's National Invitation Tournament, where they defeated Charlotte in the first round before being eliminated by Villanova in the second round. Head coach Cameron Newbauer resigned in July 2021. Allegations of abuse from former players surfaced in September.

== Offseason ==
=== Departures ===
Florida departures
Name	Number	Pos.	Height	Year	Hometown	Notes
Emily Sullivan	2	F	6'4"	RS Senior	Evansville, IN	Transferred to Long Beach State
Danielle Rainey	10	G	5'10"	RS Senior	Washington, D.C.	Transferred to Eastern Michigan
Cydnee Kinslow	32	F	6'2"	RS Senior	Oakley, CA	Graduated

=== 2021 recruiting class ===
College recruiting information
Name	Hometown	School	Height	Weight	Commit date
Taliyah Wyche; F	Fort Lauderdale, FL	American Heritage School	6 ft 3 in (1.91 m)	N/A	
Taliyah Wyche; F	Recruit ratings: ESPN: (90)				
Tatyana Wyche; F	Fort Lauderdale, FL	American Heritage School	6 ft 2 in (1.88 m)	N/A	
Tatyana Wyche; F	Recruit ratings: ESPN: (89)				
Alberte Rimdal; G	Køge, Denmark	Marselisborg Gymnasium	5 ft 9 in (1.75 m)	N/A	
Alberte Rimdal; G	Recruit ratings: No ratings found				
Jeriah Warren; G	Lake Charles, LA	LaGrange HS	6 ft 0 in (1.83 m)	N/A	
Jeriah Warren; G	Recruit ratings: No ratings found				
Overall recruit ranking:
Note: In many cases, Scout, Rivals, 247Sports, On3, and ESPN may conflict in their listings of height and weight.; In these cases, the average was taken. ESPN grades are on a 100-point scale.; Sources:

=== Incoming transfer ===
Florida incoming transfer
Name	Number	Pos.	Height	Year	Hometown	Previous school
Zippy Broughton	4	G	5'7"	Senior	Wetumpka, AL	Rutgers

== Roster ==
2021–22 Florida Gators women's basketball team
Players
Coaches

Pos.	#	Name	Height	Year	Previous school	Hometown
F	0	Taliyah Wyche	6 ft 3 in (1.91 m)	Fr	American Heritage School	Fort Lauderdale, FL
G	1	Kiara Smith	5 ft 10 in (1.78 m)	RS Sr	Forestville HS; ASA College	District Heights, MD
F	2	Tatyana Wyche	6 ft 2 in (1.88 m)	Fr	American Heritage School	Fort Lauderdale, FL
G	3	Lavender Briggs	6 ft 1 in (1.85 m)	Jr	Provo HS	Provo, UT
G	4	Zippy Broughton	5 ft 7 in (1.7 m)	Sr	Robert E. Lee HS; Rutgers	Wetumpka, AL
G	5	Alberte Rimdal	5 ft 9 in (1.75 m)	Fr	Marselisborg Gymnasium	Køge, Denmark
F	11	Emanuely de Oliveira	5 ft 10 in (1.78 m)	Sr	Wasatch Academy	Criciúma, Brazil
F	12	Jordyn Merritt	6 ft 3 in (1.91 m)	So	Plano Senior HS	Plano, TX
F	13	Floor Toonders	6 ft 4 in (1.93 m)	So	Calandlyceum Amsterdam	Wageningen, Netherlands
G	14	Kristina Moore	6 ft 1 in (1.85 m)	Sr	Abbotsleigh School	Sydney, Australia
G	15	Nina Rickards	5 ft 9 in (1.75 m)	Jr	Christ the King Regional HS	Queens, NY
G	20	Jeriah Warren	6 ft 0 in (1.83 m)	Fr	LaGrange HS	Lake Charles, LA
G	22	Brynn Farrell	6 ft 0 in (1.83 m)	So	St. Rose HS	Ortley Beach, NJ
F	25	Faith Dut	6 ft 4 in (1.93 m)	Jr	Semiahmoo Secondary School	Vancouver, BC

Head coach

- Kelly Rae Finley (Colorado State)

Assistant coach(es)

- Julian Assibey (William Penn)
- Erika Lang-Montgomery (Florida)
- Julie Plank (Ohio State)

Legend

- (C) Team captain
- (S) Suspended
- (I) Ineligible
- (W) Walk-on
- Injured
- Current redshirt

Roster

== Schedule ==
Date time, TV	Rank^{#}	Opponent^{#}	Result	Record	High points	High rebounds	High assists	Site (attendance) city, state
Exhibition
November 5, 2021*; 6:00 pm, SECN+		Flagler	W 101–56		19 – Rimdal	9 – Briggs	6 – Smith	O'Connell Center; Gainesville, FL
Non-conference regular season
November 9, 2021*; 5:00 pm, SECN+		Georgia State	W 84–70	1–0	23 – Smith	7 – Briggs	4 – Smith	O'Connell Center (639); Gainesville, FL
November 12, 2021*; 4:30 pm, YouTube		vs. Towson; Preseason WNIT Classic	L 70–87	1–1	18 – Merritt	11 – Merritt	4 – Tied	Reynolds Coliseum (200); Raleigh, NC
November 14, 2021*; 2:00 pm, ACCNX		at No. 5 NC State; Preseason WNIT Classic	L 52–85	1–2	16 – Smith	9 – Briggs	3 – Rickards	Reynolds Coliseum (3,812); Raleigh, NC
November 15, 2021*; 4:30 pm, YouTube		vs. Wofford; Preseason WNIT Classic	W 61–47	2–2	13 – Smith	7 – Smith	2 – Tied	Reynolds Coliseum (120); Raleigh, NC
November 19, 2021*; 6:00 pm, SECN+		Grambling State	W 70–55	3–2	17 – Farrell	6 – Tied	9 – Smith	O'Connell Center (759); Gainesville, FL
November 22, 2021*; 6:00 pm, SECN+		USC Upstate	W 76–54	4–2	16 – Briggs	6 – de Oliveira	4 – Briggs	O'Connell Center (764); Gainesville, FL
November 26, 2021*; 7:00 pm		vs. Saint Louis; San Juan Shootout	W 69–54	5–2	13 – Merritt	7 – Rickards	4 – Rimdal	Roberto Clemente Coliseum (200); San Juan, Puerto Rico
November 27, 2021*; 7:00 pm		vs. George Washington; San Juan Shootout	W 61–50	6–2	18 – Briggs	7 – Briggs	4 – Briggs	Roberto Clemente Coliseum (200); San Juan, Puerto Rico
December 1, 2021*; 7:00 pm		at George Mason	L 71–75	6–3	19 – Smith	12 – Briggs	6 – Smith	EagleBank Arena (769); Fairfax, VA
December 5, 2021*; 2:00 pm, ESPN+		at TCU; Big 12/SEC Challenge	W 63–54	7–3	22 – Briggs	10 – Smith	7 – Smith	Schollmaier Arena (1,468); Fort Worth, TX
December 8, 2021*; 2:00 pm, SECN+		Dayton	W 60–57	8–3	18 – Briggs	9 – Smith	7 – Smith	O'Connell Center (691); Gainesville, FL
December 12, 2021*; 1:00 pm, SECN		Florida State	W 69–55	9–3	16 – de Oliveira	8 – Rickards	4 – Briggs	O'Connell Center (1,609); Gainesville, FL
December 21, 2021*; 1:00 pm, SECN+		Murray State	W 67–51	10–3	12 – Briggs	7 – Rickards	3 – Tied	O'Connell Center (921); Gainesville, FL
SEC regular season
January 2, 2022; 3:00 pm, SECN		No. 13 Georgia	L 69–73	10–4 (0–1)	18 – Merritt	8 – Smith	5 – Smith	O'Connell Center (1,119); Gainesville, FL
January 6, 2022; 6:00 pm, SECN+		Ole Miss	L 56–74	10–5 (0–2)	13 – Smith	10 – Merritt	5 – Smith	O'Connell Center (854); Gainesville, FL
January 9, 2022; 3:00 pm, SECN+		at No. 25 Texas A&M	W 97–89 ^{2OT}	11–5 (1–2)	28 – Broughton	9 – Smith	7 – Smith	Reed Arena (3,493); College Station, TX
January 13, 2022; 6:00 pm, SECN+		Auburn	W 68–63	12–5 (2–2)	19 – Smith	5 – Tied	3 – Smith	O'Connell Center (801); Gainesville, FL
January 16, 2022; 3:00 pm, SECN+		at Alabama	W 85–77	13–5 (3–2)	17 – Rimdal	6 – Tied	6 – Smith	Coleman Coliseum (2,001); Tuscaloosa, AL
January 20, 2022; 7:00 pm, SECN		at No. 23 Kentucky	W 77–52	14–5 (4–2)	25 – Smith	8 – Tied	6 – Smith	Memorial Coliseum (3,372); Lexington, KY
January 23, 2022; 2:00 pm, SECN+		No. 11 LSU	W 73–72	15–5 (5–2)	23 – Smith	7 – Merritt	8 – Smith	O'Connell Center (1,478); Gainesville, FL
January 30, 2022; 12:00 pm, SECN		No. 1 South Carolina	L 50–62	15–6 (5–3)	22 – Smith	7 – Merritt	2 – Smith	O'Connell Center (5,319); Gainesville, FL
February 3, 2022; 6:00 pm, SECN+		No. 7 Tennessee	W 84–59	16–6 (6–3)	25 – Smith	8 – Rickards	6 – Broughton	O'Connell Center (3,809); Gainesville, FL
February 6, 2022; 1:00 pm, SECN		at No. 14 Georgia	W 54–51	17–6 (7–3)	11 – Tied	9 – Tied	3 – Broughton	Stegeman Coliseum (3,653); Athens, GA
February 10, 2022; 6:30 pm, SECN+	No. 19	at Mississippi State; Rescheduled from December 30	W 73–64	18–6 (8–3)	20 – Broughton	9 – Smith	7 – Smith	Humphrey Coliseum (4,630); Starkville, MS
February 14, 2022; 7:00 pm, SECN	No. 17	at Auburn	W 83–77	19–6 (9–3)	18 – Broughton	6 – Broughton	3 – de Oliveira	Auburn Arena (1,996); Auburn, AL
February 17, 2022; 6:00 pm, SECN+	No. 17	Arkansas	W 76–67	20–6 (10–3)	19 – Smith	8 – de Oliveira	5 – Smith	O'Connell Center (1,369); Gainesville, FL
February 20, 2022; 4:00 pm, SECN	No. 17	at No. 11 LSU	L 61–66	20–7 (10–4)	17 – Rickards	9 – Rickards	6 – Smith	Pete Maravich Assembly Center (13,620); Baton Rouge, LA
February 24, 2022; 6:30 pm, SECN	No. 15	at Vanderbilt	L 59–63	20–8 (10–5)	18 – Smith	7 – Smith	6 – Smith	Memorial Gymnasium (1,783); Nashville, TN
February 27, 2022; 12:00 pm, SECN	No. 15	Missouri	L 73–78	20–9 (10–6)	23 – Merritt	7 – Merritt	6 – Smith	O'Connell Center (2,119); Gainesville, FL
SEC Tournament
March 3, 2022; 3:30 pm, SECN	(5) No. 23	vs. (13) Vanderbilt; Second round	W 53–52	21–9	15 – Rickards	8 – Rickards	5 – Smith	Bridgestone Arena (6,446); Nashville, TN
March 4, 2022; 3:30 pm, SECN	(5) No. 23	vs. (4) Ole Miss; Quarterfinals	L 60–70	21–10	26 – Broughton	8 – Rickards	5 – Rickards	Bridgestone Arena; Nashville, TN
NCAA tournament
March 19, 2022; 3:30 pm, ESPNews	(10 B)	vs. (7 B) No. 24 UCF; First Round	L 52–69	21–11	17 – Rickards	8 – Broughton	6 – Broughton	Harry A. Gampel Pavilion (5,073); Storrs, CT
*Non-conference game. ^{#}Rankings from AP Poll. (#) Tournament seedings in parentheses. All times are in Eastern Time.

== See also ==
- 2021–22 Florida Gators men's basketball team
