= 2021–22 Kentucky Wildcats women's basketball team =

Intercollegiate basketball season

2021–22 Kentucky Wildcats women's basketball

SEC tournament champions

NCAA tournament, first round
- Conference: Southeastern Conference

Ranking
- Coaches: No. 22
- AP: No. 15
- Record: 19–12 (8–8 SEC)
- Head coach: Kyra Elzy (2nd season)
- Assistant coaches: Niya Butts; Gail Goestenkors; Amber Smith
- Home arena: Memorial Coliseum; Rupp Arena

2021–22 SEC women's basketball standings
	Conf.				Overall
Team	W		L	PCT	W		L	PCT
No. 1 South Carolina	15	–	1	.938	35	–	2	.946
No. 9 LSU	13	–	3	.813	26	–	6	.813
No. 18 Tennessee	11	–	5	.688	25	–	9	.735
Ole Miss	10	–	6	.625	23	–	9	.719
Florida	10	–	6	.625	21	–	11	.656
Georgia	9	–	7	.563	21	–	10	.677
No. 15 Kentucky †	8	–	8	.500	19	–	12	.613
Missouri	7	–	9	.438	18	–	13	.581
Arkansas	7	–	9	.438	18	–	14	.563
Alabama	6	–	10	.375	20	–	14	.588
Mississippi State	6	–	10	.375	15	–	14	.517
Texas A&M	4	–	12	.250	14	–	15	.483
Vanderbilt	4	–	12	.250	16	–	19	.457
Auburn	2	–	14	.125	10	–	18	.357
† 2022 SEC tournament winner Rankings from AP poll

The 2021–22 Kentucky Wildcats women's basketball team represented the University of Kentucky during the 2021–22 NCAA Division I women's basketball season. The Wildcats, led by second-year head coach Kyra Elzy, played most of their home games at Memorial Coliseum and two at Rupp Arena and competed as members of the Southeastern Conference (SEC).

In the January 27 loss to Vanderbilt, senior guard Rhyne Howard scored the 2,000th point of her college career. Howard became the third Wildcat to reach that benchmark.

== Previous season ==
The 2020–21 Wildcats finished the season 18–9 (9–6 SEC) to finish tied for fifth place in the conference. The Wildcats were invited to the 2021 NCAA Division I women's basketball tournament where they defeated Idaho State in the first round before losing to Iowa in the second round.

== Offseason ==
=== Departures ===
Kentucky departures
Name	Number	Pos.	Height	Year	Hometown	Notes
KeKe McKinney	3	F	6'1"	Senior	Knoxville, TN	Transferred to Charlotte
Tatyana Wyatt	14	F	6'2"	Senior	Columbus, GA	Graduated
Chasity Patterson	15	G	5'5"	Senior	Houston, TX	Graduated
Erin Toller	20	G	5'7"	Freshman	Louisville, KY	Dismissed from team
Kameron Roach	23	G	5'6"	RS Junior	Hopkins, SC	Transferred to Charlotte

=== 2021 recruiting class ===
College recruiting information
Name	Hometown	School	Height	Weight	Commit date
Jada Walker; G	Richmond, VA	Henrico HS	5 ft 7 in (1.70 m)	N/A	
Jada Walker; G	Recruit ratings: ESPN: (91)				
Kristen Crenshaw-Gill; G	Youngstown, OH	Valley Christian School	5 ft 9 in (1.75 m)	N/A	
Kristen Crenshaw-Gill; G	Recruit ratings: No ratings found				
Overall recruit ranking:
Note: In many cases, Scout, Rivals, 247Sports, On3, and ESPN may conflict in their listings of height and weight.; In these cases, the average was taken. ESPN grades are on a 100-point scale.; Sources:

== Roster ==
2021–22 Kentucky Wildcats women's basketball team
Players
Coaches

Pos.	#	Name	Height	Year	Previous school	Hometown
C	00	Olivia Owens	6 ft 4 in (1.93 m)	RS Jr	Niskayuna HS; Maryland	Albany, NY
G	1	Robyn Benton	5 ft 9 in (1.75 m)	Sr	Greater Atlanta Christian School; Auburn	Conyers, GA
G	3	Jazmine Massengill	6 ft 0 in (1.83 m)	Sr	Hamilton Heights Christian Academy; Tennessee	Chattanooga, TN
G	4	Kristen Crenshaw-Gill	5 ft 9 in (1.75 m)	Fr	Valley Christian School	Youngstown, OH
G	5	Blair Green (injured)	6 ft 0 in (1.83 m)	Sr	Harlan County HS	Harlan County, KY
G	10	Rhyne Howard	6 ft 2 in (1.88 m)	Sr	Bradley Central HS	Cleveland, TN
G	11	Jada Walker	5 ft 7 in (1.7 m)	Fr	Henrico HS	Richmond, VA
G	12	Treasure Hunt	6 ft 1 in (1.85 m)	So	Hamilton Heights Christian Academy	Chattanooga, TN
F	21	Nyah Leveretter	6 ft 3 in (1.91 m)	So	Westwood HS	Blythewood, SC
G	34	Emma King	5 ft 10 in (1.78 m)	Jr	Lincoln County HS	Stanford, KY
F	44	Dre'una Edwards	6 ft 2 in (1.88 m)	RS Jr	Liberty HS; Utah	Compton, CA

Head coach

- Kyra Elzy (Tennessee)

Assistant coach(es)

- Niya Butts (Tennessee)
- Gail Goestenkors (Saginaw Valley State)
- Amber Smith (Kentucky)

Legend

- (C) Team captain
- (S) Suspended
- (I) Ineligible
- (W) Walk-on
- Injured
- Current redshirt

Roster
Last update: June 9, 2024

== Schedule ==
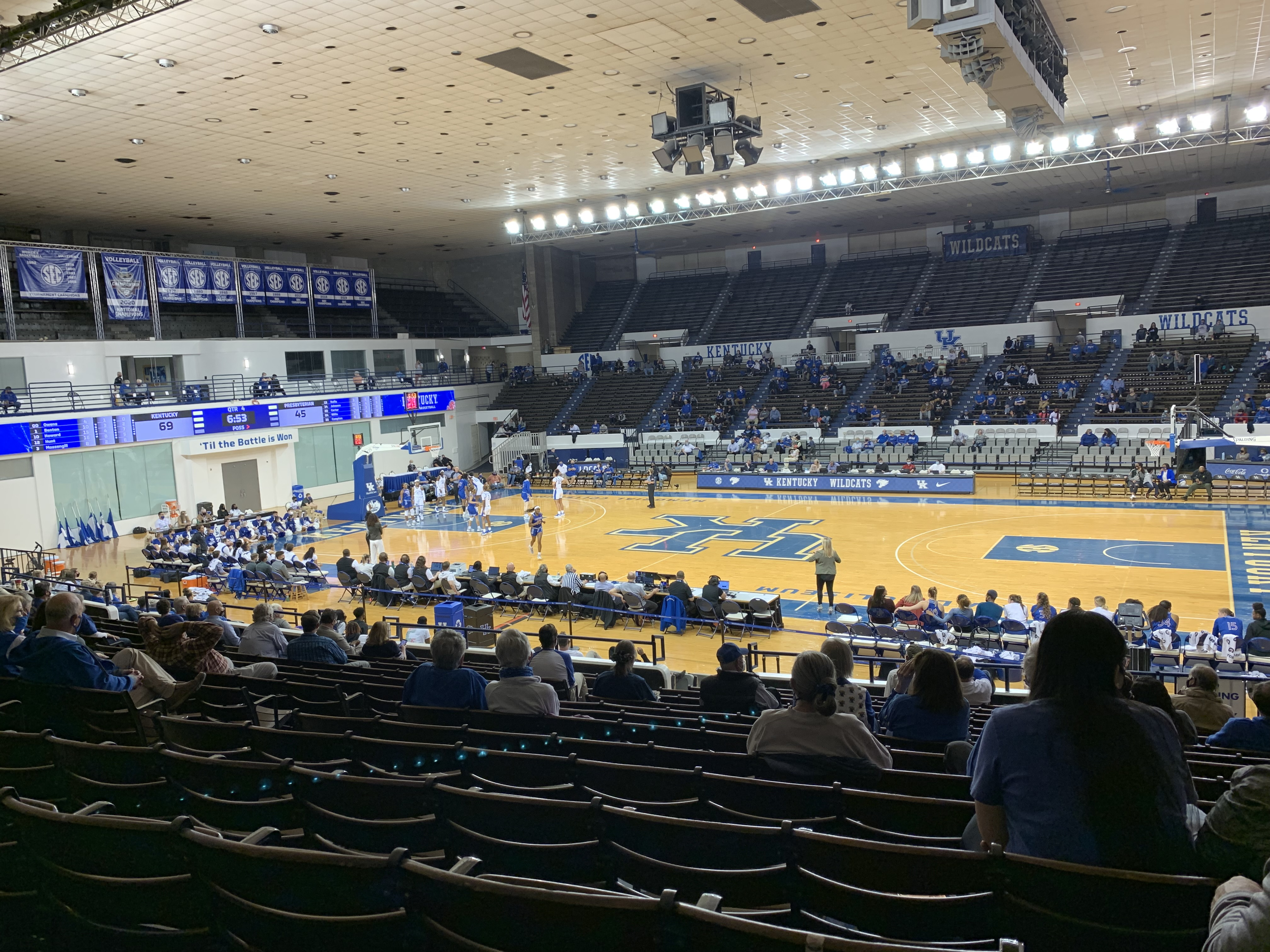
Memorial Coliseum during Kentucky's season-opening win against Presbyterian

Date time, TV	Rank^{#}	Opponent^{#}	Result	Record	High points	High rebounds	High assists	Site (attendance) city, state
Exhibition
November 4, 2021*; 7:00 p.m.	No. 13	Lee	W 95–51		21 – Edwards	8 – Edwards	7 – Massengill	Memorial Coliseum (1,505); Lexington, KY
Non-conference regular season
November 9, 2021*; 7:00 p.m., SECN+	No. 13	Presbyterian	W 81–53	1–0	20 – Edwards	9 – Hunt	7 – tied	Memorial Coliseum (3,321); Lexington, KY
November 11, 2021*; 7:00 p.m., SECN+	No. 13	North Alabama	W 98–56	2–0	27 – Edwards	10 – tied	5 – Walker	Memorial Coliseum (3,444); Lexington, KY
November 14, 2021*; 5:00 p.m., ESPN	No. 13	at No. 8 Indiana; Rivalry	L 67–88	2–1	23 – Howard	9 – Howard	2 – tied	Simon Skjodt Assembly Hall (5,394); Bloomington, IN
November 21, 2021*; 2:00 p.m., SECN+	No. 19	Winthrop	W 92–47	3–1	22 – Howard	10 – Howard	10 – Howard	Memorial Coliseum (3,587); Lexington, KY
November 27, 2021*; 8:30 p.m., SECN+	No. 20	La Salle	W 74–52	4–1	22 – Edwards	11 – Edwards	7 – Massengill	Memorial Coliseum (3,383); Lexington, KY
December 1, 2021*; 7:00 p.m., SECN+	No. 16	West Virginia; Big 12/SEC Challenge	W 83–60	5–1	27 – Howard	10 – Edwards	9 – Massengill	Memorial Coliseum (3,587); Lexington, KY
December 5, 2021*; 2:00 p.m., SECN+	No. 16	Merrimack	W 90–56	6–1	21 – Howard	11 – Edwards	8 – Massengill	Memorial Coliseum (3,541); Lexington, KY
December 9, 2021*; 7:00 p.m., SECN	No. 14	DePaul	L 85–94	6–2	22 – Benton	7 – tied	5 – Massengill	Rupp Arena (4,906); Lexington, KY
December 12, 2021*; 1:00 p.m., ESPN	No. 14	at No. 7 Louisville; Rivalry / Jimmy V Classic	L 58–64	6–3	14 – tied	14 – Edwards	4 – Edwards	KFC Yum! Center (12,167); Louisville, KY
December 17, 2021*; 7:00 p.m., SECN+	No. 19	Morgan State	Canceled					Memorial Coliseum; Lexington, KY
December 19, 2021*; 2:00 p.m., SECN+	No. 19	USC Upstate	W 67–44	7–3	22 – Howard	12 – Edwards	4 – tied	Memorial Coliseum (3,521); Lexington, KY
SEC regular season
January 6, 2022; 7:00 p.m., SECN+	No. 21	No. 15 Georgia	W 84–76	8–3 (1–0)	30 – Howard	6 – Edwards	5 – Edwards	Memorial Coliseum (3,013); Lexington, KY
January 9, 2021; 1:00 p.m., ESPN	No. 21	at No. 1 South Carolina	L 54–74	8–4 (1–1)	11 – Benton	8 – Howard	6 – Howard	Colonial Life Arena (12,327); Columbia, SC
January 16, 2021; 3:00 p.m., ESPN	No. 19	at No. 5 Tennessee; Rivalry	L 58–84	8–5 (1–2)	24 – Howard	6 – tied	3 – Howard	Thompson–Boling Arena (10,012); Knoxville, TN
January 20, 2022; 7:00 p.m., SECN	No. 23	Florida	L 52–77	8–6 (1–3)	17 – Howard	10 – Howard	3 – Howard	Memorial Coliseum; Lexington, KY
January 23, 2022; 7:00 p.m., SECN	No. 23	Ole Miss	L 54–63	8–7 (1–4)	24 – Howard	10 – Howard	2 – Massengill	Rupp Arena; Lexington, KY
January 25, 2022; 8:00 p.m., SECN+		at Auburn	W 67–55	9–7 (2–4)	29 – Howard	9 – Howard	4 – Massengill	Auburn Arena (1,780); Auburn, AL
January 27, 2021; 8:00 p.m.		at Vanderbilt	L 57–65	9–8 (2–5)	25 – Howard	10 – Howard	6 – Massengill	Memorial Gymnasium; Nashville, TN
January 30, 2021; 2:00 p.m., SECN		at No. 12 LSU	L 69–78	9–9 (2–6)	23 – Howard	12 – Howard	3 – tied	Pete Maravich Assembly Center (8,734); Baton Rouge, LA
February 6, 2022; 12:00 p.m., ESPN2		Texas A&M	L 64–73 ^{OT}	9–10 (2–7)	19 – Howard	10 – tied	5 – Massengill	Memorial Coliseum; Lexington, KY
February 10, 2022; 7:00 p.m., ESPN		South Carolina	L 50–59	9–11 (2–8)	21 – Howard	9 – Howard	4 – tied	Memorial Coliseum; Lexington, KY
February 13, 2021; 2:00 p.m., SECN		at Alabama	W 67–63	10–11 (3–8)	24 – Edwards	9 – Howard	5 – Massengill	Coleman Coliseum; Tuscaloosa, AL
February 15, 2022; 5:00 p.m., SECN+		Mississippi State; Rescheduled from January 3	W 81–74	11–11 (4–8)	23 – Edwards	11 – Howard	6 – Howard	Memorial Coliseum; Lexington, KY
February 17, 2022; 7:00 p.m., SECN+		Vanderbilt	W 69–65	12–11 (5–8)	20 – Edwards	7 – Edwards	9 – Massengill	Memorial Coliseum; Lexington, KY
February 20, 2021; 2:00 p.m., SECN		at Arkansas	W 78–55	13–11 (6–8)	29 – Howard	13 – Edwards	3 – Edwards	Bud Walton Arena; Fayetteville, AR
February 24, 2021; 8:00 p.m., SECN+		at Missouri	W 78–63	14–11 (7–8)	30 – Edwards	12 – Howard	7 – Massengill	Mizzou Arena; Columbia, MO
February 27, 2022; 4:00 p.m., SECN		Auburn	W 90–62	15–11 (8–8)	32 – Howard	9 – Walker	10 – Massengill	Memorial Coliseum (5,268); Lexington, KY
SEC tournament
March 3, 2022; 7:00 p.m., SECN	(7)	vs. (10) Mississippi State; Second round	W 83–67	16–11	21 – Walker	14 – Edwards	7 – Massengill	Bridgestone Arena (6,500); Nashville, TN
March 4, 2022; 7:00 p.m., SECN	(7)	vs. (2) No. 6 LSU; Quarterfinals	W 78–63	17–11	32 – Howard	10 – Edwards	8 – Massengill	Bridgestone Arena (7,704); Nashville, TN
March 5, 2022; 7:30 p.m., ESPNU	(7)	vs. (3) No. 18 Tennessee; Semifinals / Rivalry	W 83–74	18–11	24 – Howard	9 – Howard	7 – Howard	Bridgestone Arena (9,072); Nashville, TN
March 6, 2022; 2:00 p.m., ESPN	(7)	vs. (1) No. 1 South Carolina; Championship	W 64–62	19–11	27 – Edwards	9 – Edwards	6 – Massengill	Bridgestone Arena (7,997); Nashville, TN
NCAA tournament
March 19, 2022; 4:00 p.m., ESPN	(6 B) No. 15	vs. (11 B) No. 25 Princeton; First round	L 62–69	19–12	17 – Howard	12 – Edwards	3 – tied	Simon Skjodt Assembly Hall (6,389); Bloomington, IN
*Non-conference game. ^{#}Rankings from AP poll. (#) Tournament seedings in parentheses. All times are in Eastern.

== See also ==
- 2021–22 Kentucky Wildcats men's basketball team
