= 2021–22 Texas A&M Aggies women's basketball team =

Intercollegiate basketball season

2021–22 Texas A&M Aggies women's basketball
- Conference: Southeastern Conference
- Record: 14–15 (4–12 SEC)
- Head coach: Gary Blair (19th season)
- Assistant coaches: Kelly Bond-White; Vernette Skeete; Greg Brown
- Home arena: Reed Arena

2021–22 SEC women's basketball standings
	Conf.				Overall
Team	W		L	PCT	W		L	PCT
No. 1 South Carolina	15	–	1	.938	35	–	2	.946
No. 9 LSU	13	–	3	.813	26	–	6	.813
No. 18 Tennessee	11	–	5	.688	25	–	9	.735
Ole Miss	10	–	6	.625	23	–	9	.719
Florida	10	–	6	.625	21	–	11	.656
Georgia	9	–	7	.563	21	–	10	.677
No. 15 Kentucky †	8	–	8	.500	19	–	12	.613
Missouri	7	–	9	.438	18	–	13	.581
Arkansas	7	–	9	.438	18	–	14	.563
Alabama	6	–	10	.375	20	–	14	.588
Mississippi State	6	–	10	.375	15	–	14	.517
Texas A&M	4	–	12	.250	14	–	15	.483
Vanderbilt	4	–	12	.250	16	–	19	.457
Auburn	2	–	14	.125	10	–	18	.357
† 2022 SEC tournament winner Rankings from AP poll

The 2021–22 Texas A&M Aggies women's basketball team represented Texas A&M University in the 2021–22 NCAA Division I women's basketball season. The team's head coach is Gary Blair, who was in his nineteenth and final season at Texas A&M, as he announced his retirement effective at the end of the season. The team played their home games at the Reed Arena in College Station, Texas, and in its tenth season as a member of the Southeastern Conference.

== Previous season ==
The Aggies finished the 2020–21 season with a record of 25–3 (13–1 SEC), ranked fourth in the nation, and were regular season champions. They lost the SEC tournament semifinals round to Georgia. They received an at-large bid to the NCAA Division I Tournament, where they advanced to the Sweet Sixteen before losing to Arizona.

== Roster ==
2021–22 Texas A&M Aggies women's basketball team
Players
Coaches

Pos.	#	Name	Height	Year	Previous school	Hometown
G	2	Qadashah Hoppie	5 ft 9 in (1.75 m)	Sr	St. John's University	Staten Island, NY
G	3	Destiny Pitts	5 ft 10 in (1.78 m)	Sr	Minnesota	Detroit, MI
G	4	Kay Kay Green	5 ft 6 in (1.68 m)	So	Whitney M. Young Magnet HS	Chicago, IL
G	5	Jordan Nixon	5 ft 3 in (1.6 m)	Jr	Notre Dame	New York City, NY
G	11	Kayla Wells	6 ft 0 in (1.83 m)	Sr	South Grand Prairie HS	Dallas, TX
F	13	Jada Malone	6 ft 3 in (1.91 m)	Fr	The Village School	Spring, TX
F	14	Maliyah Johnson	6 ft 2 in (1.88 m)	So	Summer Creek HS	Chicago, IL
G	21	Eriny Kindred	6 ft 2 in (1.88 m)	Fr	Del Valle HS	Del Valle, TX
C	22	Kenyal Perry	5 ft 6 in (1.68 m)	So	McKinley HS	New Orleans, LA
G	23	Mckinzie Green	5 ft 6 in (1.68 m)	Jr	Manvel HS	Manvel, TX
G	24	Sahara Jones	6 ft 0 in (1.83 m)	So	Veterans Memorial HS	San Antonio, TX
F	32	Aaliyah Patty	6 ft 3 in (1.91 m)	Sr	Ohio State University	Chester, IL
C	44	Sydnee Roby	6 ft 3 in (1.91 m)	Jr	University of Miami	Milwaukee, WI

Head coach

- Gary Blair (Texas Tech)

Assistant coach(es)

- Kelly Bond-White (Illinois)
- Vernette Skeete (Alcorn State)
- Greg Brown (Lipscomb)

Legend

- (C) Team captain
- (S) Suspended
- (I) Ineligible
- (W) Walk-on
- Injured
- Current redshirt

Roster
Last update: September 12, 2021

== Schedule ==
Date time, TV	Rank^{#}	Opponent^{#}	Result	Record	Site (attendance) city, state
Exhibition
11/03/2021; 7:00 p.m.	No. 23	Oklahoma Baptist; Exhibition	W 89–38		Reed Arena; College Station, TX
Non-conference regular season
11/09/2021; 7:00 p.m., SECN+	No. 23	A&M–Corpus Christi; South Texas Showdown	W 87–54	1–0	Reed Arena (2,329); College Station, TX
11/11/2021; 7:00 p.m., SECN+	No. 23	Southern	W 92–32	2–0	Reed Arena (2,847); College Station, TX
11/15/2021; 7:00 p.m., SECN+	No. 24	DePaul	W 95–75	3–0	Reed Arena (2,922); College Station, TX
11/18/2021; 7:00 p.m., SECN+	No. 24	Stephen F. Austin	W 82–75	4–0	Reed Arena (2,913); College Station, TX
11/25/2021; 7:00 pm, ESPN+	No. 23	vs. Pittsburgh; Paradise Jam tournament	W 57–46	5–0	Sports and Fitness Center (621); Saint Thomas, USVI
11/26/2021; 7:00 pm, ESPN+	No. 23	vs. South Dakota; Paradise Jam Tournament	W 58–44	6–0	Sports and Fitness Center (876); Saint Thomas, USVI
11/27/2021; 7:00 pm, ESPN+	No. 23	vs. Northwestern; Paradise Jam Tournament	W 77–68	7–0	Sports and Fitness Center (878); Saint Thomas, USVI
12/01/2021; 11:00 a.m., SECN+	No. 17	Little Rock	W 65–50	8–0	Reed Arena (6,414); College Station, TX
12/05/2021; 3:00 p.m., SECN	No. 17	No. 15 Texas; Big 12/SEC Challenge	L 60–76	8–1	Reed Arena (7,100); College Station, TX
12/09/2021; 7:00 p.m., SECN+	No. 18	Texas Southern	W 88–43	9–1	Reed Arena (2,932); College Station, TX
12/12/2021; 1:00 p.m., ESPN+	No. 18	at TCU	L 75–87	9–2	Schollmaier Arena (2,371); Fort Worth, TX
12/19/2021; 2:00 p.m., ESPN+	No. 23	Rice	Canceled		Reed Arena; College Station, TX
12/20/2021; 2:00 p.m., SECN+	No. 23	UTSA	W 77–51	10–2	Reed Arena (3,391); College Station, TX
SEC regular season
1/02/2022; 2:00 p.m., SECN+	No. 23	at No. 19 LSU	L 66–75	10–3 (0–1)	Maravich Center (7,400); Baton Rouge, LA
1/06/2022; 5:30 p.m., SECN	No. 25	at No. 7 Tennessee	L 45–73	10–4 (0–2)	Thompson–Boling Arena (6,235); Knoxville, TN
1/09/2022; 2:00 p.m., SECN+	No. 25	Florida	L 89–97 ^{2OT}	10–5 (0–3)	Reed Arena; College Station, TX
1/13/2022; 6:00 p.m., SECN		at No. 1 South Carolina	L 45–65	10–6 (0–4)	Colonial Life Arena; Columbia, SC
1/16/2022; 4:00 p.m., SECN		Auburn	W 71–53	11–6 (1–4)	Reed Arena; College Station, TX
1/20/2022; 7:00 p.m., SECN+		Ole Miss	L 63–80	11–7 (1–5)	Reed Arena; College Station, TX
1/23/2022; 5:00 p.m., SECN		at Missouri	L 69–78	11–8 (1–6)	Mizzou Arena; Columbia, MO
1/30/2022; 3:00 p.m., SECN		at Mississippi State	L 58–78	11–9 (1–7)	Humphrey Coliseum; Starkville, MS
2/03/2022; 8:00 p.m., SECN		Arkansas	W 77–64	12–9 (2–7)	Reed Arena; College Station, TX
2/06/2022; 11:00 a.m., ESPN2		at Kentucky	W 73–64 ^{OT}	13–9 (3–7)	Memorial Coliseum; Lexington, KY
2/10/2022; 7:00 p.m., SECN+		Vanderbilt; Rescheduled from December 30	W 76–58	14–9 (4–7)	Reed Arena; College Station, TX
2/13/2022; 2:00 p.m., SECN+		No. 14 LSU	L 58–74	14–10 (4–8)	Reed Arena; College Station, TX
2/17/2022; 8:00 p.m., SECN		at Ole Miss	L 54–74	14–11 (4–9)	The Pavilion at Ole Miss; Oxford, MS
2/20/2022; 5:00 p.m., SECN		Alabama	L 79–81 ^{2OT}	14–12 (4–10)	Reed Arena (3,825); College Station, TX
2/24/2022; 7:30 p.m., SECN		No. 1 South Carolina	L 48–89	14–13 (4–11)	Reed Arena (5,883); College Station, TX
2/27/2022; 1:00 p.m., SECN+		at No. 25т Georgia	L 58–67	14–14 (4–12)	Stegeman Coliseum; Athens, GA
SEC Tournament
3/2/2022; 11:00 am, SECN	(12)	vs. (13) Vanderbilt; First Round	L 69–85	14–15	Bridgestone Arena; Nashville, TN
*Non-conference game. ^{#}Rankings from AP Poll. (#) Tournament seedings in parentheses. All times are in Central Time.

== Rankings ==
Ranking movements Legend: ██ Increase in ranking ██ Decrease in ranking
	Week																				
Poll	Pre	1	2	3	4	5	6	7	8	9	10	11	12	13	14	15	16	17	18	19	Final
AP	23	24	23																		
Coaches	17	17*	18																		

*Coaches did not release a week 1 poll.
