= 2021–22 Vanderbilt Commodores women's basketball team =

Intercollegiate basketball season

2021–22 Vanderbilt Commodores women's basketball

WNIT, Third Round
- Conference: Southeastern Conference
- Record: 16–19 (4–12 SEC)
- Head coach: Shea Ralph (1st season)
- Assistant coaches: Tom Garrick; Ashley Earley; Kevin DeMille
- Home arena: Memorial Gymnasium

2021–22 SEC women's basketball standings
	Conf.				Overall
Team	W		L	PCT	W		L	PCT
No. 1 South Carolina	15	–	1	.938	35	–	2	.946
No. 9 LSU	13	–	3	.813	26	–	6	.813
No. 18 Tennessee	11	–	5	.688	25	–	9	.735
Ole Miss	10	–	6	.625	23	–	9	.719
Florida	10	–	6	.625	21	–	11	.656
Georgia	9	–	7	.563	21	–	10	.677
No. 15 Kentucky †	8	–	8	.500	19	–	12	.613
Missouri	7	–	9	.438	18	–	13	.581
Arkansas	7	–	9	.438	18	–	14	.563
Alabama	6	–	10	.375	20	–	14	.588
Mississippi State	6	–	10	.375	15	–	14	.517
Texas A&M	4	–	12	.250	14	–	15	.483
Vanderbilt	4	–	12	.250	16	–	19	.457
Auburn	2	–	14	.125	10	–	18	.357
† 2022 SEC tournament winner Rankings from AP poll

The 2021–22 Vanderbilt Commodores women's basketball team represented Vanderbilt University during the 2021–22 NCAA Division I women's basketball season. The Commodores, led by first-year head coach Shea Ralph, played their home games at Memorial Gymnasium and competed as members of the Southeastern Conference (SEC).

== Previous season ==
The Commodores finished the season 4–4 (0–3 SEC) after cutting their season short due to COVID-19. Head coach Stephanie White was fired after five seasons. UConn assistant Shea Ralph was hired to replace her.

== Offseason ==
=== Departures ===
Vanderbilt departures
Name	Number	Pos.	Height	Year	Hometown	Reason for departure
Enna Pehadzic	1	G	5'9"	RS senior	Horsens, Denmark	Graduated
Chelsie Hall	2	G	5'7"	Senior	Boca Raton, FL	Transferred to Louisville
Koi Love	23	F	6'0"	Sophomore	Orlando, FL	Transferred to Arizona
Autumn Newby	24	F	6'2"	Senior	Lawrenceville, GA	Transferred to LSU
Kyndall Golden	25	F	6'3"	Sophomore	Atlanta, GA	Left team
Emily Bowman	44	C	6'6"	Freshman	Huntsville, AL	Transferred to Samford

=== 2021 recruiting class ===
College recruiting
Name	Hometown	School	Height	Weight	Commit date
De'Mauri Flournoy; G	Villa Rica, GA	Carrollton HS	5 ft 7 in (1.70 m)	N/A	
De'Mauri Flournoy; G	Recruit ratings: ESPN: (91)				
Sacha Washington; F	Lawrenceville, GA	Collins Hill HS	6 ft 2 in (1.88 m)	N/A	
Sacha Washington; F	Recruit ratings: ESPN: (91)				
Iyana Moore; G	Murfreesboro, TN	Blackman HS	5 ft 8 in (1.73 m)	N/A	
Iyana Moore; G	Recruit ratings: ESPN: (90)				
Kendal Cheesman; G	Tampa, FL	Henry B. Plant HS	6 ft 2 in (1.88 m)	N/A	
Kendal Cheesman; G	Recruit ratings: No ratings found				
Khaniah Gardner; F	Chicago, IL	Simeon Career Academy	6 ft 0 in (1.83 m)	N/A	
Khaniah Gardner; F	Recruit ratings: No ratings found				
Overall recruit ranking:
Note: In many cases, Scout, Rivals, 247Sports, On3, and ESPN may conflict in their listings of height and weight.; In these cases, the average was taken. ESPN grades are on a 100-point scale.; Sources:

=== Incoming transfers ===
Vanderbilt incoming transfers
Name	Number	Pos.	Height	Year	Hometown	Previous school
Asha Taylor	14	G	5'10"	RS senior	Fort Lauderdale, FL	Dartmouth

== Roster ==
2021–22 Vanderbilt Commodores women's basketball team
Players
Coaches

Pos.	#	Name	Height	Year	Previous school	Hometown
G	3	Jordyn Cambridge	5 ft 9 in (1.75 m)	Sr	The Ensworth School	Nashville, TN
F	5	Yaubryon Chambers	6 ft 1 in (1.85 m)	Jr	Providence Christian Academy	Murfreesboro, TN
F	11	Kendal Cheesman	6 ft 2 in (1.88 m)	Fr	Henry B. Plant HS	Tampa, FL
G	12	Demi Washington	5 ft 10 in (1.78 m)	Jr	New Hope Academy	Wake Forest, NC
G	13	De'Mauri Flournoy	5 ft 7 in (1.7 m)	Fr	Carrollton HS	Villa Rica, GA
G	14	Asha Taylor	5 ft 10 in (1.78 m)	RS Sr	Miami Country Day School; Dartmouth	Fort Lauderdale, FL
F	15	Brinae Alexander	5 ft 10 in (1.78 m)	Sr	Riverdale HS	Murfreesboro, TN
G	21	Bella LaChance	5 ft 6 in (1.68 m)	So	St. Thomas Aquinas HS	Davie, FL
G	22	Brylee Bartram	5 ft 8 in (1.73 m)	Jr	Seffner Christian Academy; Florida	Tampa, FL
G	23	Iyana Moore	5 ft 8 in (1.73 m)	Fr	Blackman HS	Murfreesboro, TN
F	25	Khaniah Gardner	6 ft 0 in (1.83 m)	Fr	Simeon Career Academy	Chicago, IL
G	33	Kiara Pearl	5 ft 8 in (1.73 m)	Jr	Eastern HS	Louisville, KY
F	35	Sacha Washington	6 ft 2 in (1.88 m)	Fr	Collins Hill HS	Lawrenceville, GA
F	50	Kaylon Smith	5 ft 10 in (1.78 m)	Jr	Oxbridge Academy	West Palm Beach, FL

Head coach

- Shea Ralph (Connecticut)

Assistant coach(es)

- Tom Garrick (Rhode Island)
- Ashley Earley (Vanderbilt)
- Kevin DeMille (Connecticut)

Legend

- (C) Team captain
- (S) Suspended
- (I) Ineligible
- (W) Walk-on
- Injured
- Current redshirt

Roster

== Schedule ==
Date time, TV	Rank^{#}	Opponent^{#}	Result	Record	High points	High rebounds	High assists	Site (attendance) city, state
Non-conference regular season
November 9, 2021*; 7:00 pm, SECN+		Gardner–Webb	W 75–59	1–0	20 – Alexander	9 – Smith	3 – Tied	Memorial Gymnasium (1,465); Nashville, TN
November 12, 2021*; 7:00 pm, SECN+		Little Rock	L 40–56	1–1	11 – Bartram	6 – Alexander	6 – Cambridge	Memorial Gymnasium (1,633); Nashville, TN
November 15, 2021*; 6:30 pm, ESPN+		at Middle Tennessee	L 46–55	1–2	19 – Cambridge	9 – Cambridge	4 – Moore	Murphy Center (4,510); Murfreesboro, TN
November 18, 2021*; 6:00 pm, SECN		Tennessee Tech	W 75–55	2–2	14 – Flournoy	6 – S. Washington	4 – Cambridge	Memorial Gymnasium; Nashville, TN
November 21, 2021*; 2:00 pm, SECN+		Jacksonville State	W 71–61	3–2	16 – Alexander	10 – Cambridge	4 – Cambridge	Memorial Gymnasium; Nashville, TN
November 25, 2021*; 2:15 pm, ESPN3		vs. No. 9 Arizona; Paradise Jam	L 46–48	3–3	10 – Tied	6 – Tied	2 – Tied	Sports and Fitness Center; Saint Thomas, USVI
November 26, 2021*; 12:00 pm, ESPN+		vs. Rutgers; Paradise Jam	W 51–40	4–3	11 – Alexander	5 – Tied	3 – Tied	Sports and Fitness Center; Saint Thomas, USVI
November 27, 2021*; 12:00 pm, ESPN+		vs. DePaul; Paradise Jam	L 74–91	4–4	17 – Cambridge	10 – S. Washington	3 – Tied	Sports and Fitness Center; Saint Thomas, USVI
November 30, 2021*; 7:00 pm, SECN+		Chattanooga	W 91–61	5–4	17 – Flournoy	10 – S. Washington	5 – Cambridge	Memorial Gymnasium; Nashville, TN
December 5, 2021*; 2:00 pm, ESPN+		at Kansas; Big 12/SEC Challenge	L 67–74	5–5	23 – Alexander	8 – D. Washington	7 – Cambridge	Allen Fieldhouse; Lawrence, KS
December 8, 2021*; 11:00 am, SECN+		Albany	W 52–41	6–5	17 – Alexander	11 – Smith	4 – Cambridge	Memorial Gymnasium (3,688); Nashville, TN
December 18, 2021*; 7:00 pm, SECN+		Presbyterian	W 81–57	7–5	21 – Alexander	7 – S. Washington	7 – Cambridge	Memorial Gymnasium; Nashville, TN
December 21, 2021*; 11:00 am, ESPN+		at Saint Joseph's	W 64–45	8–5	18 – Alexander	7 – D. Washington	8 – Cambridge	Hagan Arena; Philadelphia, PA
December 28, 2021*; 7:00 pm, SECN+		Alabama State	W 94–42	9–5	32 – Moore	9 – D. Washington	7 – Cambridge	Memorial Gymnasium; Nashville, TN
SEC regular season
January 6, 2022; 7:30 pm, SECN		Arkansas	W 54–51	10–5 (1–0)	16 – Alexander	9 – Tied	5 – Cambridge	Memorial Gymnasium; Nashville, TN
January 9, 2022; 2:00 pm, SECN+		at Mississippi State	L 63–70	10–6 (1–1)	20 – Moore	10 – S. Washington	5 – Cambridge	Humphrey Coliseum; Starkville, MS
January 13, 2022; 8:00 pm, SECN		No. 5 Tennessee; Rivalry	L 51–65	10–7 (1–2)	16 – Moore	9 – Cambridge	3 – Cambridge	Memorial Gymnasium (2,489); Nashville, TN
January 16, 2022; 12:00 pm, SECN		at No. 12 LSU	L 64–82	10–8 (1–3)	24 – Alexander	7 – Tied	3 – Tied	Pete Maravich Assembly Center; Baton Rouge, LA
January 20, 2022; 7:00 pm, SECN+		Missouri	L 52–66	10–9 (1–4)	19 – Alexander	9 – Smith	3 – Tied	Memorial Gymnasium; Nashville, TN
January 24, 2022; 6:00 pm, SECN		at No. 1 South Carolina	L 30–85	10–10 (1–5)	10 – Alexander	6 – Smith	2 – LaChance	Colonial Life Arena (11,329); Columbia, SC
January 27, 2022; 7:00 pm, SECN+		Kentucky	W 65–57	11–10 (2–5)	26 – Alexander	12 – S. Washington	6 – Cambridge	Memorial Gymnasium; Nashville, TN
January 30, 2022; 2:00 pm, SECN+		Auburn	W 81–66	12–10 (3–5)	24 – Alexander	10 – Cambridge	7 – Moore	Memorial Gymnasium; Nashville, TN
February 3, 2022; 6:00 pm, SECN+		at No. 14 Georgia	L 56–71	12–11 (3–6)	13 – Alexander	9 – Alexander	4 – Tied	Stegeman Coliseum; Athens, GA
February 6, 2022; 2:00 pm, SECN		Alabama	L 71–77 ^{OT}	12–12 (3–7)	19 – Alexander	16 – S. Washington	6 – Moore	Memorial Gymnasium; Nashville, TN
February 10, 2022; 7:00 pm, SECN+		at Texas A&M; Rescheduled from December 30	L 58–76	12–13 (3–8)	13 – Cambridge	7 – S. Washington	4 – Cambridge	Reed Arena; College Station, TX
February 13, 2022; 11:00 am, SECN		at No. 13 Tennessee; Rivalry	L 52–66	12–14 (3–9)	19 – Alexander	6 – S. Washington	3 – Cambridge	Thompson–Boling Arena; Knoxville, TN
February 17, 2022; 6:00 pm, SECN+		at Kentucky	L 65–69	12–15 (3–10)	21 – Cambridge	8 – S. Washington	8 – Moore	Memorial Coliseum; Lexington, KY
February 20, 2022; 2:00 pm, SECN+		Ole Miss	L 47–57	12–16 (3–11)	19 – Moore	5 – Chambers	2 – Cambridge	Memorial Gymnasium; Nashville, TN
February 24, 2022; 5:30 pm, SECN		No. 15 Florida	W 63–59	13–16 (4–11)	16 – S. Washington	11 – S. Washington	5 – Cambridge	Memorial Gymnasium; Nashville, TN
February 27, 2022; 2:00 pm, SECN+		at Alabama	L 71–77	13–17 (4–12)	23 – S. Washington	13 – S. Washington	9 – Cambridge	Coleman Coliseum; Tuscaloosa, AL
SEC Tournament
March 2, 2022; 11:00 am, SECN	(13)	vs. (12) Texas A&M; First round	W 85–69	14–17	23 – Alexander	15 – Cambridge	10 – Cambridge	Bridgestone Arena; Nashville, TN
March 3, 2022; 2:30 pm, SECN	(13)	vs. (5) No. 23 Florida; Second round	L 52–53	14–18	18 – Alexander	13 – S. Washington	4 – Cambridge	Bridgestone Arena; Nashville, TN
WNIT
March 17, 2022; 7:00 pm, SECN+		Murray State; First Round	W 73–47	15–18	24 – Cambridge	9 – Cambridge	6 – Cambridge	Memorial Gymnasium; Nashville, TN
March 21, 2022; 7:00 pm		Liberty; Second Round	W 71–45	16–18	25 – Moore	7 – S. Washington	3 – Cambridge	Memorial Gymnasium; Nashville, TN
March 24, 2022; 6:30 pm		at Middle Tennessee; Third Round	L 53–55	16–19	14 – Tied	8 – S. Washington	2 – Flournoy	Murphy Center (3,022); Murfreesboro, TN
*Non-conference game. ^{#}Rankings from AP Poll. (#) Tournament seedings in parentheses. All times are in Central Time.

== See also ==
- 2021–22 Vanderbilt Commodores men's basketball team
