= 2021–22 Mississippi State Bulldogs women's basketball team =

Intercollegiate basketball season

2021–22 Mississippi State Bulldogs women's basketball
- Conference: Southeastern Conference
- Record: 15–14 (6–10 SEC)
- Head coach: Doug Novak (1st season; interim)
- Assistant coaches: Eddie Benton; Bob Thornton; Malikah Willis
- Home arena: Humphrey Coliseum

2021–22 SEC women's basketball standings
	Conf.				Overall
Team	W		L	PCT	W		L	PCT
No. 1 South Carolina	15	–	1	.938	35	–	2	.946
No. 9 LSU	13	–	3	.813	26	–	6	.813
No. 18 Tennessee	11	–	5	.688	25	–	9	.735
Ole Miss	10	–	6	.625	23	–	9	.719
Florida	10	–	6	.625	21	–	11	.656
Georgia	9	–	7	.563	21	–	10	.677
No. 15 Kentucky †	8	–	8	.500	19	–	12	.613
Missouri	7	–	9	.438	18	–	13	.581
Arkansas	7	–	9	.438	18	–	14	.563
Alabama	6	–	10	.375	20	–	14	.588
Mississippi State	6	–	10	.375	15	–	14	.517
Texas A&M	4	–	12	.250	14	–	15	.483
Vanderbilt	4	–	12	.250	16	–	19	.457
Auburn	2	–	14	.125	10	–	18	.357
† 2022 SEC tournament winner Rankings from AP poll

The 2021–22 Mississippi State Bulldogs women's basketball team represented Mississippi State University during the 2021–22 NCAA Division I women's basketball season. The Bulldogs, led by first-year interim head coach Doug Novak, played their home games at Humphrey Coliseum and competed as members of the Southeastern Conference (SEC).

== Previous season ==
The Bulldogs finished the season 10–9 (5–7 SEC) to finish in ninth place in the conference. Head coach Nikki McCray-Penson stepped down on October 12, 2021, for health reasons.

== Offseason ==
=== Departures ===
Mississippi State Departures
Name	Number	Pos.	Height	Year	Hometown	Notes
JaMya Mingo-Young	0	G	5'8"	Sophomore	Bogalusa, LA	Transferred to Alabama
Aliyah Matharu	3	G	5'7"	Sophomore	Washington, D.C.	Transferred to Texas
Sidney Cooks	10	F/C	6'4"	RS Junior	Kenosha, WI	Transferred to Seton Hall
Xaria Wiggins	11	G	6'1"	Junior	Virginia Beach, VA	Transferred to Auburn
Yemiyah Morris	20	C	6'6"	Senior	San Bernardino, CA	Transferred to West Virginia
Madison Hayes	21	G	6'0"	Freshman	Chattanooga, TN	Transferred to NC State

=== 2021 recruiting class ===
College recruiting information
Name	Hometown	School	Height	Weight	Commit date
Kn'isha Godfrey; G	Tampa, FL	Tampa Bay Technical HS	5 ft 9 in (1.75 m)	N/A	
Kn'isha Godfrey; G	Recruit ratings: ESPN: (93)				
Jasmine Shavers; G	Mequite, TX	John Horn HS	5 ft 9 in (1.75 m)	N/A	
Jasmine Shavers; G	Recruit ratings: ESPN: (92)				
Mia Moore; G	Alpharetta, GA	St. Francis HS	5 ft 6 in (1.68 m)	N/A	
Mia Moore; G	Recruit ratings: ESPN: (90)				
Denae Carter; F	Philadelphia, PA	Saint Basil Academy	6 ft 0 in (1.83 m)	N/A	
Denae Carter; F	Recruit ratings: No ratings found				
Overall recruit ranking:
Note: In many cases, Scout, Rivals, 247Sports, On3, and ESPN may conflict in their listings of height and weight.; In these cases, the average was taken. ESPN grades are on a 100-point scale.; Sources:

=== Incoming transfers ===
Mississippi State incoming transfers
Name	Number	Pos.	Height	Year	Hometown	Previous school
Anastasia Hayes	0	G	5'7"	RS Senior	Murfreesboro, TN	Middle Tennessee
JerKaila Jordan	2	G	5'9"	Sophomore	New Orleans, LA	Tulane
Aislynn Hayes	10	G	5'6"	Junior	Murfreesboro, TN	Middle Tennessee
Alasia Hayes	15	G	5'7"	Sophomore	Murfreesboro, TN	Notre Dame
Ashley Jones	24	G	5'7"	RS Junior	Philadelphia, PA	Temple
Raven Farley	44	F	6'4"	RS Senior	Elizabeth, NJ	St. John's

== Roster ==
2021–22 Mississippi State Bulldogs women's basketball team
Players
Coaches

Pos.	#	Name	Height	Year	Previous school	Hometown
G	0	Anastasia Hayes	5 ft 7 in (1.7 m)	RS Sr	Riverdale HS; Middle Tennessee	Murfreesboro, TN
G	1	Myah Taylor	5 ft 7 in (1.7 m)	RS Sr	Olive Branch HS	Olive Branch, MS
G	2	JerKaila Jordan	5 ft 9 in (1.75 m)	So	John Curtis Christian School; Tulane	New Orleans, LA
G	3	Jasmine Shavers	5 ft 9 in (1.75 m)	Fr	John Horn HS	Mesquite, TX
F/C	4	Jessika Carter	6 ft 5 in (1.96 m)	Sr	Harris County HS	Waverly Hall, GA
F	5	Rickea Jackson	6 ft 2 in (1.88 m)	Jr	Detroit Edison Public School Academy	Detroit, MI
G	10	Aislynn Hayes	5 ft 6 in (1.68 m)	Jr	Riverdale HS; Middle Tennessee	Murfreesboro, TN
G	11	Kn'isha Godfrey	5 ft 9 in (1.75 m)	Fr	Tampa Bay Technical HS	Tampa, FL
G	12	Mia Moore	5 ft 6 in (1.68 m)	Fr	St. Francis HS	Alpharetta, GA
G	15	Alasia Hayes	5 ft 7 in (1.7 m)	So	Riverdale HS; Notre Dame	Murfreesboro, TN
C	22	Charlotte Kohl	6 ft 5 in (1.96 m)	So	Theo Koch Schule	Giessen, Germany
G	23	Caterrion Thompson	5 ft 11 in (1.8 m)	RS Sr	Lima Senior HS; Bowling Green	Lima, OH
G	24	Ashley Jones	5 ft 7 in (1.7 m)	RS Jr	Neumann Goretti Catholic HS; Temple	Philadelphia, PA
F	25	Denae Carter	6 ft 0 in (1.83 m)	Fr	St. Basil Academy	Philadelphia, PA
F	44	Raven Farley	6 ft 4 in (1.93 m)	RS Sr	Queen of Peace HS; St. John's	Elizabeth, NJ

Head coach

- Doug Novak (Tennessee)

Assistant coach(es)

- Eddie Benton (Vermont)
- Bob Thornton (UC Irvine)
- Malikah Willis (Iowa)

Legend

- (C) Team captain
- (S) Suspended
- (I) Ineligible
- (W) Walk-on
- Injured
- Current redshirt

Roster

== Schedule ==
Date time, TV	Rank^{#}	Opponent^{#}	Result	Record	High points	High rebounds	High assists	Site (attendance) city, state
Exhibition
November 1, 2021*; 6:00 pm		Mississippi College	W 94–47		22 – Jackson	11 – Farley	9 – Taylor	Humphrey Coliseum (1,106); Starkville, MS
Non-conference regular season
November 9, 2021*; 6:00 pm, SECN+		Alabama State	W 91–62	1–0	26 – Jackson	11 – D. Carter	11 – Taylor	Humphrey Coliseum (4,439); Starkville, MS
November 12, 2021*; 6:00 pm, SECN+		South Dakota State	W 76–71	2–0	23 – Jackson	11 – Jordan	7 – Taylor	Humphrey Coliseum (4,720); Starkville, MS
November 14, 2021*; 5:00 pm, SECN+		Alcorn State	W 86–63	3–0	26 – Jordan	12 – Thompson	9 – Taylor	Humphrey Coliseum (4,541); Starkville, MS
November 22, 2021*; 6:00 pm, SECN+		Bethune–Cookman	W 94–53	4–0	20 – Jordan	13 – Farley	7 – Taylor	Humphrey Coliseum (4,558); Starkville, MS
November 25, 2021*; 11:00 am, FloSports		vs. Dayton; Daytona Beach Invitational	W 65–54	5–0	20 – Jackson	9 – D. Carter	1 – Tied	Ocean Center; Daytona Beach, FL
November 27, 2021*; 3:30 pm, FloSports		vs. No. 12 Michigan; Daytona Beach Invitational	L 48–64	5–1	18 – Jordan	8 – Jordan	3 – Taylor	Ocean Center; Daytona Beach, FL
December 1, 2021*; 6:00 pm, SECN+		McNeese State	W 102–55	6–1	40 – Jackson	14 – D. Carter	10 – Taylor	Humphrey Coliseum (4,557); Starkville, MS
December 4, 2021*; 2:00 pm, BSOK		at Oklahoma; Big 12/SEC Challenge	L 63–94	6–2	21 – An. Hayes	8 – Jackson	2 – Tied	Lloyd Noble Center (1,400); Norman, OK
December 12, 2021*; 2:00 pm, ESPN+		at UT Martin	W 54–37	7–2	19 – Jackson	9 – Farley	6 – Taylor	Kathleen and Tom Elam Center (1,379); Martin, TN
December 18, 2021*; 2:00 pm, SECN+		Troy	L 66–73	7–3	25 – Jackson	12 – D. Carter	4 – Taylor	Humphrey Coliseum (4,561); Starkville, MS
December 19, 2021*; 4:00 pm, SECN		Jackson State	W 74–66	8–3	24 – Jackson	13 – D. Carter	7 – Taylor	Humphrey Coliseum (5,736); Starkville, MS
December 20, 2021*; 2:30 pm, SECN+		South Carolina State	W 85–47	9–3	15 – Thompson	14 – D. Carter	8 – Taylor	Humphrey Coliseum (4,296); Starkville, MS
SEC regular season
January 2, 2022; 5:00 pm, SECN+		at No. 1 South Carolina	L 68–80	9–4 (0–1)	16 – Jordan	8 – D. Carter	2 – Taylor	Colonial Life Arena (11,403); Columbia, SC
January 6, 2022; 6:00 pm, SECN+		at Alabama	W 65–62	10–4 (1–1)	22 – An. Hayes	10 – D. Carter	6 – Taylor	Coleman Coliseum (1,922); Tuscaloosa, AL
January 9, 2022; 2:00 pm, SECN+		Vanderbilt	W 70–63	11–4 (2–1)	31 – An. Hayes	7 – D. Carter	6 – Taylor	Humphrey Coliseum (4,417); Starkville, MS
January 16, 2022; 2:00 pm, SECN		at Ole Miss	L 71–86	11–5 (2–2)	24 – An. Hayes	5 – Jackson	5 – Ai. Hayes	SJB Pavilion (2,260); Oxford, MS
January 20, 2022; 6:00 pm, SECN+		No. 13 Georgia	L 63–66	11–6 (2–3)	27 – Jackson	10 – D. Carter	3 – Tied	Humphrey Coliseum (4,961); Starkville, MS
January 23, 2022; 3:00 pm, SECN		at Arkansas	L 54–74	11–7 (2–4)	17 – An. Hayes	8 – D. Carter	3 – Taylor	Bud Walton Arena (4,177); Fayetteville, AR
January 27, 2022; 5:30 pm, SECN		Missouri	W 77–62	12–7 (3–4)	27 – Thompson	5 – Tied	8 – Taylor	Humphrey Coliseum (4,426); Starkville, MS
January 30, 2022; 3:00 pm, SECN		Texas A&M	W 78–58	13–7 (4–4)	22 – An. Hayes	9 – Jordan	7 – An. Hayes	Humphrey Coliseum (4,673); Starkville, MS
February 3, 2022; 7:00 pm, SECN+		at Auburn	W 70–65	14–7 (5–4)	26 – An. Hayes	9 – An. Hayes	4 – An. Hayes	Auburn Arena (1,924); Auburn, AL
February 10, 2022; 5:30 pm, SECN+		No. 19 Florida; Rescheduled from December 30	L 64–73	14–8 (5–5)	22 – An. Hayes	10 – Jordan	7 – Taylor	Humphrey Coliseum (4,630); Starkville, MS
February 13, 2022; 3:00 pm, SECN		Ole Miss	W 70–59	15–8 (6–5)	21 – An. Hayes	5 – Kohl	2 – Tied	Humphrey Coliseum (5,100); Starkville, MS
February 15, 2022; 5:00 pm, SECN+		at Kentucky; Rescheduled from January 13	L 74–81	15–9 (6–6)	21 – An. Hayes	6 – Thompson	8 – Taylor	Memorial Coliseum (3,688); Lexington, KY
February 17, 2022; 6:00 pm, SECN+		No. 11 LSU	L 59–71	15–10 (6–7)	17 – An. Hayes	11 – Kohl	5 – An. Hayes	Humphrey Coliseum (4,601); Starkville, MS
February 20, 2022; 2:00 pm, SECN+		at Missouri	L 66–76	15–11 (6–8)	21 – Thompson	6 – Kohl	5 – Taylor	Mizzou Arena; Columbia, MO
February 24, 2022; 5:30 pm, SECN+		at No. 16 Tennessee	L 64–86	15–12 (6–9)	18 – An. Hayes	5 – Tied	4 – Tied	Thompson–Boling Arena (7,009); Knoxville, TN
February 27, 2022; 5:00 pm, SECN		Arkansas	L 79–87	15–13 (6–10)	20 – An. Hayes	18 – Kohl	7 – Taylor	Humphrey Coliseum (4,840); Starkville, MS
SEC Tournament
March 3, 2022; 6:00 pm, SECN	(10)	vs. (7) Kentucky; Second Round	L 67–83	15–14	21 – Jordan	8 – Thompson	7 – Taylor	Bridgestone Arena; Nashville, TN
*Non-conference game. ^{#}Rankings from AP Poll. (#) Tournament seedings in parentheses. All times are in Central Time.

== See also ==
- 2021–22 Mississippi State Bulldogs men's basketball team
