= Doug Novak =

American basketball coach

Current position
- Title: Head coach
- Team: Trevecca Nazarene
- Conference: Gulf South Conference

Biographical details
- Education: Tennessee (1990)

Coaching career (HC unless noted)
- 1992–1995: Roane State (assistant)
- 1995–1998: Iowa Western
- 1998–1999: Francis Marion (assistant)
- 1999–2006: Anderson
- 2006–2010: The Citadel (assistant)
- 2010–2013: Tulane (assistant)
- 2013–2021: Bethel
- 2021–2022: Mississippi State (interim women's HC)
- 2022–2023: Army (associate HC)
- 2023–2024: Northern Kentucky (women's assistant)
- 2024–2025: George Washington (women's assistant)
- 2025: George Washington (interim HC)
- 2025–present: Trevecca Nazarene

Head coaching record
- Overall: 148–84 (.638)
- Tournaments: NCAA D3: 0–1

Doug Novak is an American basketball coach who is currently the head coach for the Trevecca Trojans women's basketball team. He was previously an assistant coach and then the interim head coach for the George Washington Revolutionaries women's basketball team. Novak has been head coach before, coaching the Iowa Western Reivers, Anderson Trojans, and Bethel Royals men's basketball teams, and acting as an interim head coach for the Mississippi State Bulldogs and George Washington Revolutionaries women's basketball teams.

== College ==
Novak attended the University of Tennessee from 1987 to 1990, majoring in psychology. While at Tennessee, Novak played tennis and was a part of the Tennessee tennis team that was ranked number one at the collegiate level.

== Coaching career ==
After serving as an assistant tennis coach at Clemson University, Novak coached as an assistant basketball coach for various colleges, most notably The Citadel and Tulane University. Novak was also the head coach at Iowa Western Community College, Anderson University, and Bethel University. Following an eight-year tenure at Bethel, he became an assistant coach for Mississippi State University women's basketball. He was later elevated to the position of interim head coach following the resignation of Nikki McCray-Penson. Following his season as interim head coach, Novak was hired as the associate head coach for the Army Black Knights men's basketball team. After his sole year with Army, Novak was hired as an assistant coach for the Northern Kentucky Norse women's basketball team before the 2023 season. After one season at Northern Kentucky, Novak became an assistant coach for the George Washington Revolutionaries women's basketball team. During his first season at George Washington, Novak was elevated to interim head coach after former head coach Carolina McCombs stepped down. Following his lone season at George Washington, Novak became the head coach of the Trevecca Nazarene women's basketball team.

== Head coaching record ==
Record table
Season	Team	Overall	Conference	Standing	Postseason
Bethel (men) (MIAC) (2013–2021)
2013–14	Bethel	14–13	9–11	6th	
2014–15	Bethel	19–9	13–7	4th	
2015–16	Bethel	18–19	12–8	5th	
2016–17	Bethel	21–7	15–5	T-1st	NCAA D3 Round of 64
2017–18	Bethel	21–7	14–6	3rd	
2018–19	Bethel	19–8	15–5	3rd	
2019–20	Bethel	16–10	13–7	4th	
2020–21	Bethel	3–5	3–3	T-3rd	
Bethel (men):		131–68 (.658)	94–52 (.644)		
Mississippi State (women) (SEC) (2021–2022)
2021–22	Mississippi State	15–14	6–10	T–10th	
Mississippi State (women):		15–14 (.517)	6–10 (.375)		
George Washington (women) (Atlantic 10) (2025)
2024–25	George Washington	2–2	1–1	T–12th	
George Washington (women):		2–2 (.500)	1–1 (.500)		
Total:		148–84 (.638)			
National champion Postseason invitational champion Conference regular season champion Conference regular season and conference tournament champion Division regular season champion Division regular season and conference tournament champion Conference tournament champion
