= Johnnie Harris (basketball) =

American basketball coach (born 1966)

Current position
- Title: Associate Head Coach
- Team: Baylor
- Conference: Big 12 Conference

Biographical details
- Born: November 8, 1966 (age 59); Pine Bluff, Arkansas, U.S.

Playing career
- 1984–1986: Arkansas–Pine Bluff
- 1987–1989: Arkansas Baptist

Coaching career (HC unless noted)
- 1998–2001: Arkansas–Little Rock (assistant)
- 2001–2003: Arkansas–Fort Smith (assistant)
- 2003–2004: NC State (assistant)
- 2004–2007: Arkansas (assistant)
- 2007–2012: Texas A&M (assistant)
- 2012–2020: Mississippi State (AHC)
- 2020–2021: Texas (AHC)
- 2021–2025: Auburn
- 2025–present: Baylor (AHC)

Head coaching record
- Overall: 58–63 (.479)

Johnnie Harris (born November 8, 1966) was the head coach of the Auburn Tigers women's basketball team. Previously she coached for Arkansas, Texas A&M, Mississippi State, and the University of Texas. While at Mississippi State, she served as the Associate Head Coach under Vic Schaefer. She was known for helping with the recruitment of high-profile players like Teaira McCowan and Victoria Vivians. Mississippi State advanced to back-to-back National Championship Games in 2017 and 2018, losing to South Carolina in the former and Notre Dame in the latter. The Bulldogs also won SEC titles in 2018 and 2019. Following Vic Schaefer's departure in 2020 to take the vacant Texas job, Johnnie Harris followed him and remained his Associate Head Coach until her hiring by Auburn in 2021. On March 6, 2025 Harris was relieved of her duties as the Auburn basketball coach.

== Head coaching record ==
Record table
Season	Team	Overall	Conference	Standing	Postseason
Auburn Tigers (Southeastern Conference) (2021–2025)
2021–22	Auburn	10–18	2–14	14th	
2022–23	Auburn	16–15	5–11	T–10th	WNIT Second Round
2023–24	Auburn	20–12	8–8	T–7th	NCAA First Four
2024–25	Auburn	12–18	3–13	T–13th	
Auburn:		58–63 (.479)	18–46 (.281)		
Total:		58–63 (.479)			
