= Kelly Rae Finley =

American college basketball coach

Current position
- Title: Assistant Coach
- Team: Virginia

Biographical details
- Born: April 27, 1985 (age 41); Minneapolis, Minnesota, U.S.

Playing career
- 2004–2005: Northwestern
- 2006–2008: Colorado State
- Position: Forward

Coaching career (HC unless noted)
- 2008–2009: Harvard (volunteer assistant)
- 2009–2012: Harvard (assistant)
- 2012–2016: Colorado (assistant)
- 2016–2017: Arizona (assistant)
- 2017–2021: Florida (assistant)
- 2021–2026: Florida
- 2026–Present: Virginia (assistant)

Head coaching record
- Overall: 93–75 (.554)

Kelly Rae Finley (born April 27, 1985) is an American basketball coach who was the head coach of the Florida Gators women's basketball team. An assistant coach for the Gators from 2017 to 2021, she served as the interim head coach of the Gators for the 2021-22 season and was hired as the 11th head coach of the program following the regular season. Prior to her tenure at the University of Florida, she was an assistant coach with Harvard, Colorado, and Arizona.

== Biography ==
Finley grew up in Minneapolis, Minnesota and attended the Breck School, where she played basketball under her father, Ray Finley, and led the team to the Minnesota Class 2A State Championship as a senior in 2004.

After attending Northwestern for her freshman season in 2004–05, Finley transferred to Colorado State University and played for the Rams from 2005 to 2008.

== Coaching career ==
Finley began her coaching career as a volunteer assistant with Harvard for the 2008–09 season. She became a fulltime assistant from 2009 to 2012. She followed up with coaching stints at Colorado from 2012 to 2016 and Arizona for the 2016–17 season. She served as a recruiting coordinator at all three schools. In 2017, she joined Florida's staff under new head coach Cameron Newbauer. She was promoted to associate head coach in 2019.

Following allegations of player mistreatment, Newbauer resigned as head coach abruptly on September 27, 2021. Finley was named the interim head coach for the 2021-22 season. Despite the preseason turmoil surrounding Newbauer's departure and expectations that the Gators would finish 11th in the Southeastern Conference, the season ended with the Gators exceeding expectations to finish 4th in the conference and earning an NCAA tournament berth for the first time since 2016. Finley was given the permanent head coaching position on February 28, 2022.

== Head coaching record ==
Record table
Season	Team	Overall	Conference	Standing	Postseason
Florida Gators (Southeastern Conference) (2021–2026)
2021–22	Florida	21–11	10–6	T–4th	NCAA first round
2022–23	Florida	19–15	5–11	T–10th	WNIT Great 8
2023–24	Florida	16–16	5–11	11th	WBIT First Round
2024–25	Florida	19–18	5–11	11th	WBIT Semifinals
2025–26	Florida	18–15	5–11	T–12th	
Florida:		93–75 (.554)	30–50 (.375)		
Total:		93–75 (.554)			
National champion Postseason invitational champion Conference regular season champion Conference regular season and conference tournament champion Division regular season champion Division regular season and conference tournament champion Conference tournament champion

== Career statistics ==
Legend
GP	Games played	GS	Games started	MPG	Minutes per game	RPG	Rebounds per game
APG	Assists per game	SPG	Steals per game	BPG	Blocks per game	PPG	Points per game
TO	Turnovers per game	FG%	Field-goal percentage	3P%	3-point field-goal percentage	FT%	Free-throw percentage
**Bold**	Career best	°	League leader

=== College ===
Year	Team	GP	GS	MPG	FG%	3P%	FT%	RPG	APG	SPG	BPG	TO	PPG
2004–05	Northwestern	13	-	**18.3**	**36.5**	22.7	30.0	2.5	**0.9**	0.5	0.2	1.8	3.5
2005–06	Colorado State	Sat out due to NCAA Transfer Rules											
2006–07	Colorado State	20	-	17.1	35.0	**35.9**	**83.3**	**3.0**	0.8	**0.7**	**0.3**	1.6	**4.5**
2007–08	Colorado State	**24**	-	8.3	25.6	22.2	52.9	1.4	0.5	0.3	0.0	**0.5**	1.4
**Career**		57	-	13.6	33.3	29.1	62.7	2.2	0.7	0.5	0.1	1.2	3.0
Statistics retrieved from Sports-Reference.
