= Kyra Elzy =

American basketball coach (born 1978)

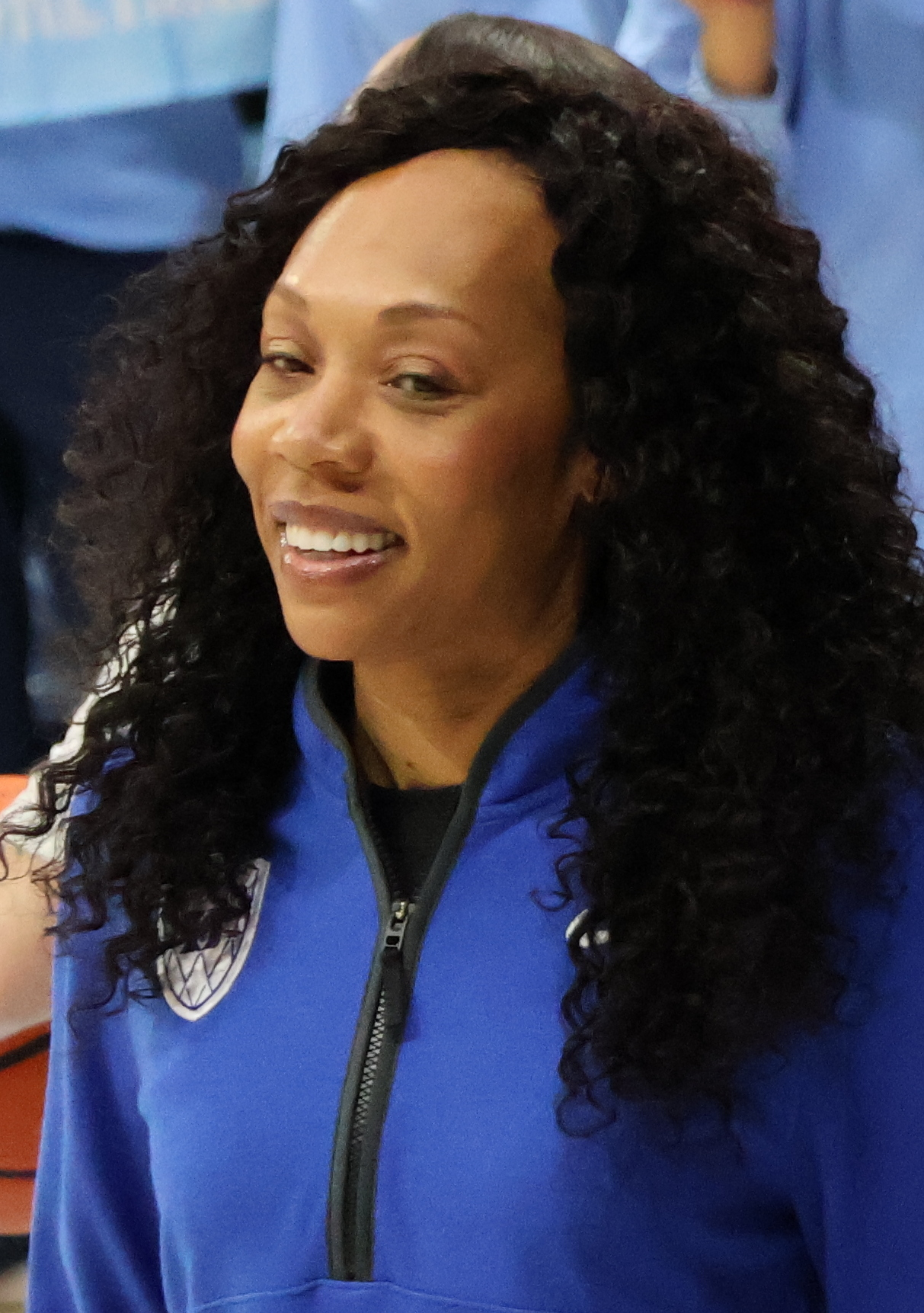
- Elzy with Duke in 2025

Current position
- Title: Assistant coach
- Team: Duke
- Conference: ACC

Biographical details
- Born: August 17, 1978 (age 48); La Grange, Kentucky U.S.

Playing career
- 1996–2001: Tennessee
- Position: Guard

Coaching career (HC unless noted)
- 2002–2004: Western Kentucky (assistant)
- 2004–2008: Kansas (assistant)
- 2008–2010: Kentucky (assistant)
- 2010–2012: Kentucky (AHC)
- 2012–2015: Tennessee (assistant)
- 2015–2016: Tennessee (AHC)
- 2016–2020: Kentucky (AHC)
- 2020–2024: Kentucky
- 2024–present: Duke (assistant)

Head coaching record
- Overall: 61–60 (.504)

Accomplishments and honors

Championships
- SEC Women's Basketball Tournament (2022) ACC Women's Basketball Tournament (2025)

Awards
- Maggie Dixon Award winner (2021)
Medal record
Women's basketball
Representing United States
World Championship
| Gold medal – first place | 1997 Brazil | Team competition |

Kyra Elzy (born August 17, 1978) is an American college basketball coach who is an assistant coach for the Duke Blue Devils women's basketball team. She was previously the head coach at the University of Kentucky.

== College career ==
Elzy attended Tennessee between 1996 and 2001, sitting out the 1998 – 99 season due to an injury. Under acclaimed coach Pat Summitt, she was a member of the teams that won the national championship in 1997 and 1998, as well as the team that finished as the national runner-up in 2000. She was named the winner of the Holly Warlick defensive player of the year award in 1997.

== Coaching career ==
Elzy served as an assistant coach at Western Kentucky and Kansas before joining Matthew Mitchell's staff at Kentucky as an assistant ahead of the 2008 season. She then served as associate head coach from 2010 to 2012 before returning to her alma mater as part of Holly Warlick's initial staff at Tennessee.

In 2016, Elzy was re-hired by Mitchell as associate head coach at Kentucky before being named interim head coach following Mitchell's retirement in 2020. Following a 6–0 start to the 2020-21 season, Kentucky removed the interim tag from Elzy, making her permanent head coach.

On March 11, 2024, following back-to-back losing seasons and after failing to qualify for the NCAA Tournament in consecutive years, Kentucky announced that Elzy had been fired as head coach.

Elzy was hired to be an assistant coach on Kara Lawson's staff at Duke in the summer of 2024.

== Head coaching record ==
Record table
| Season | Team | Overall | Conference | Standing | Postseason |
|---|---|---|---|---|---|
Kentucky Wildcats (Southeastern Conference) (2020–2024)
| 2020–21 | Kentucky | 18–9 | 9–6 | T–5th | NCAA Second Round |
| 2021–22 | Kentucky | 19–12 | 8–8 | 7th | NCAA First Round |
| 2022–23 | Kentucky | 12–19 | 2–14 | T–13th | |
| 2023–24 | Kentucky | 12–20 | 4–12 | 12th | |
| Kentucky: | | 61–60 (.504) | 23–40 (.365) | | |
| Total: | | 61–60 (.504) | | | |
National champion Postseason invitational champion Conference regular season champion Conference regular season and conference tournament champion Division regular season champion Division regular season and conference tournament champion Conference tournament champion

== Career statistics ==
=== College ===
| Year | Team | GP | GS | MPG | FG% | 3P% | FT% | RPG | APG | SPG | BPG | TO | PPG |
|---|---|---|---|---|---|---|---|---|---|---|---|---|---|
| 1996–97 | Tennessee | 39 | - | - | 36.3 | 36.6 | 56.9 | 3.5 | 1.8 | 1.4 | 0.5 | - | 5.8 |
| 1997–98 | Tennessee | 24 | - | - | 40.8 | 41.4 | 68.6 | 4.0 | 1.5 | 1.5 | 0.5 | - | 7.0 |
| 1998–99 | Tennessee | 1 | - | - | 0.0 | 0.0 | 100.0 | 3.0 | 3.0 | 1.0 | 0.0 | - | 2.0 |
| 1999–00 | Tennessee | 37 | - | - | 36.7 | 36.4 | 49.2 | 2.6 | 0.9 | 1.0 | 0.1 | - | 3.1 |
| 2000–01 | Tennessee | 26 | - | - | 43.5 | 46.3 | 57.1 | 1.7 | 0.4 | 0.8 | 0.1 | - | 2.0 |
| Career | | 127 | - | - | 38.3 | 38.7 | 58.4 | 3.0 | 1.2 | 1.2 | 0.3 | - | 4.4 |
Statistics retrieved from Sports-Reference.
