= 2021–22 Kansas Jayhawks women's basketball team =

Sports season

2021–22 Kansas Jayhawks women's basketball

NCAA tournament, second round
- Conference: Big 12 Conference
- Record: 21–10 (11–7 Big 12)
- Head coach: Brandon Schneider (7th season)
- Assistant coaches: Terry Nooner; Morgan Paige; Karyla Middlebrook
- Home arena: Allen Fieldhouse

2021–22 Big 12 Conference women's basketball standings
	Conf.				Overall
Team	W		L	PCT	W		L	PCT
No. 7 Baylor	15	–	3	.833	28	–	7	.800
No. 10 Iowa State	14	–	4	.778	28	–	7	.800
No. 6 Texas †	13	–	5	.722	29	–	7	.806
No. 22 Oklahoma	12	–	6	.667	25	–	9	.735
Kansas	11	–	7	.611	21	–	10	.677
Kansas State	9	–	9	.500	20	–	13	.606
West Virginia	7	–	11	.389	15	–	15	.500
Texas Tech	4	–	14	.222	11	–	19	.367
Oklahoma State	3	–	15	.167	9	–	20	.310
TCU	2	–	16	.111	6	–	22	.214
† 2022 Big 12 Tournament winner Rankings from AP poll

The 2021–22 Kansas Jayhawks women's basketball team represented the University of Kansas in the 2021–22 NCAA Division I women's basketball season. The Jayhawks were led by seventh-year head coach Brandon Schneider. They played their home games at Allen Fieldhouse in Lawrence, Kansas as members of the Big 12 Conference. Kansas made the 2022 NCAA tournament, their first since 2013, losing in the second round to Stanford.

== Previous season ==
The Jayhawks finished the season 7–18, 3–15 in Big 12 play to finish in a tie for ninth place. As the ninth seed in the Big 12 Tournament, they lost to TCU in the First Round. They were not invited to the NCAA tournament or the WNIT.

== Roster ==
2021–22 Kansas Jayhawks women's basketball team
Players
Coaches

Pos.	#	Name	Height	Year	Hometown
G	0	Erica Haynes-Overton	5 ft 5 in (1.65 m)	Sr	Nashville, TN
C	1	Taiyanna Jackson	6 ft 6 in (1.98 m)	Jr	East Chicago, IN
F	3	Matea Nikolic	6 ft 4 in (1.93 m)	Fr	Skopje, North Macedonia
G	4	Mia Vuksic	5 ft 10 in (1.78 m)	So	Šibenik, Croatia
G	5	Aniya Thomas	5 ft 7 in (1.7 m)	Sr	Duncanville, TX
F	10	Ioanna Chatzileonti	6 ft 2 in (1.88 m)	So	Athens, Greece
F	11	Sanna Strom	6 ft 0 in (1.83 m)	Fr	Luleå, Sweden
F	12	Katrine Jessen	6 ft 3 in (1.91 m)	So	Skovlunde, Denmark
G	13	Holly Kersgieter	5 ft 10 in (1.78 m)	Jr	Sand Springs, OK
C	14	Danai Papadopoulou	6 ft 4 in (1.93 m)	Fr	Thessaloniki, Greece
G	15	Zakiyah Franklin	5 ft 7 in (1.7 m)	Jr	Lakeland, FL
G	20	Julie Brosseau	5 ft 9 in (1.75 m)	GS	Repentigny, QC
G	25	Chandler Prater	5 ft 11 in (1.8 m)	RS So	Kansas City, MO
C	33	Nadira Eltayeb	6 ft 4 in (1.93 m)	So	Tacoma, WA
C	45	Chisom Ajekwu	6 ft 4 in (1.93 m)	Jr	Lawrence, KS

Head coach

- Brandon Schneider (Wayland Baptist)

Assistant coach(es)

- Terry Nooner (Kansas)
- Morgan Paige (Wisconsin)
- Karyla Middlebrook (Kansas State)

Legend

- (C) Team captain
- (S) Suspended
- (I) Ineligible
- (W) Walk-on
- Injured
- Current redshirt

Roster

== Schedule and results ==
Date time, TV	Rank^{#}	Opponent^{#}	Result	Record	Site (attendance) city, state
Non-conference regular season
November 10, 2021*; 7:00 pm, ESPN+		SIU Edwardsville	W 98–62	1–0	Allen Fieldhouse (1,127); Lawrence, KS
November 14, 2021*; 2:00 pm, ESPN+		Tennessee State	W 83–60	2–0	Allen Fieldhouse (1,122); Lawrence, KS
November 17, 2021*; 7:00 pm, ESPN+		Omaha	W 81–56	3–0	Allen Fieldhouse (1,113); Lawrence, KS
November 21, 2021*; 2:00 pm, ESPN+		Saint Louis	W 79–50	4–0	Allen Fieldhouse (1,106); Lawrence, KS
November 26, 2021*; 5:30 pm, FloSports		vs. No. 11 Tennessee; South Point Thanksgiving Shootout	L 58–68	4–1	South Point Arena; Enterprise, NV
November 27, 2021*; 8:00 pm, FloSports		vs. UTEP; South Point Thanksgiving Shootout	W 81–55	5–1	South Point Arena; Enterprise, NV
December 1, 2021*; 7:00 pm, ESPN+		UTRGV	W 75–44	6–1	Allen Fieldhouse (1,110); Lawrence, KS
December 5, 2021*; 2:00 pm, ESPN+		Vanderbilt; Big 12/SEC Women's Challenge	W 74–67	7–1	Allen Fieldhouse (1,228); Lawrence, KS
December 12, 2021*; 2:00 pm, ESPN+		Santa Clara	W 80–65	8–1	Allen Fieldhouse (1,109); Lawrence, KS
December 21, 2021*; 8:00 pm, ESPN+		at Wichita State	W 68–55	9–1	Charles Koch Arena (2,679); Wichita, KS
December 28, 2021*; 7:00 pm, ESPN+		Northwestern State	Canceled due to COVID-19 protocols from Kansas		Allen Fieldhouse; Lawrence, KS
Big 12 regular season
January 8, 2022; 4:00 pm, ESPN+		No. 23 Oklahoma	L 68–82	9–2 (0–1)	Allen Fieldhouse (1,655); Lawrence, KS
January 10, 2022; 6:30 pm, ESPN+		at TCU; Rescheduled from January 2	W 78–72	10–2 (1–1)	Schollmaier Arena (1,370); Fort Worth, TX
January 12, 2022; 7:00 pm, LHN		at No. 13 Texas	W 70–66	11–2 (2–1)	Frank Erwin Center (2,379); Austin, TX
January 16, 2022; 2:00 pm, ESPN+		No. 16 Baylor	L 79–82	11–3 (2–2)	Allen Fieldhouse (1,688); Lawrence, KS
January 19, 2022; 6:30 pm, ESPN+		at Kansas State; Sunflower Showdown	L 61–69	11–4 (2–3)	Bramlage Coliseum (4,027); Manhattan, KS
January 22, 2022; 4:00 pm, ESPN+		Texas Tech	W 71–57	12–4 (3–3)	Allen Fieldhouse (1,176); Lawrence, KS
January 26, 2022; 6:30 pm, ESPN+		at No. 13 Iowa State	L 62–77	12–5 (3–4)	Hilton Coliseum (9,418); Ames, IA
January 29, 2022; 1:00 pm, ESPN+		at Oklahoma State	W 68–54	13–5 (4–4)	Gallagher-Iba Arena (2,040); Stillwater, OK
February 2, 2022; 7:00 pm, ESPN+		Oklahoma State	W 65–56	14–5 (5–4)	Allen Fieldhouse (1,031); Lawrence, KS
February 6, 2022; 2:00 pm, ESPN+		at TCU	W 75–60	15–5 (6–4)	Allen Fieldhouse (1,615); Lawrence, KS
February 9, 2022; 6:00 pm, ESPN+		at West Virginia	W 65–47	16–5 (7–4)	WVU Coliseum (1,151); Morgantown, WV
February 12, 2022; 6:00 pm, ESPN+		Kansas State; Sunflower Showdown	W 63–51	17–5 (8–4)	Allen Fieldhouse (3,709); Lawrence, KS
February 15, 2022; 7:00 pm, ESPN+		West Virginia; Rescheduled from January 5	W 74–63	18–5 (9–4)	Allen Fieldhouse (854); Lawrence, KS
February 19, 2022; 2:00 pm, ESPN+		at Texas Tech	W 71–68	19–5 (10–4)	United Supermarkets Arena (5,291); Lubbock, TX
February 23, 2022; 7:00 pm, ESPN+		No. 9 Iowa State	L 59–85	19–6 (10–5)	Allen Fieldhouse (2,901); Lawerence, KS
February 26, 2022; 2:00 pm, ESPN+		at No. 5 Baylor	L 77–85	19–7 (10–6)	Ferrell Center (5,639); Waco, TX
March 2, 2022; 7:00 pm, ESPN+		Texas	L 60–70	19–8 (10–7)	Allen Fieldhouse (2,490); Lawrence, KS
March 5, 2022; 2:00 pm, BSOK		at No. 19 Oklahoma	W 73–67	20–8 (11–7)	Lloyd Noble Center (3,104); Norman, OK
Big 12 Tournament
March 11, 2022; 11:00 am, ESPNU/ESPN+	(5)	vs. (4) No. 21 Oklahoma; Quarterfinals	L 68–80	20–9	Municipal Auditorium (2,679); Kansas City, MO
NCAA Women's Tournament
March 18, 2022*; 6:30 pm, ESPNU	(8 W)	vs. (9 W) Georgia Tech; First Round	W 77–58	21–9	Maples Pavilion; Stanford, CA
March 20, 2022*; 8:00 pm, ESPN	(8 W)	at (1 W) No. 2 Stanford; Second Round	L 65–91	21–10	Maples Pavilion (4,189); Stanford, CA
*Non-conference game. ^{#}Rankings from AP Poll / Coaches' Poll. (#) Tournament seedings in parentheses. All times are in Central Time.

== See also ==
- 2021–22 Kansas Jayhawks men's basketball team
