= 2021–22 Tennessee Lady Volunteers basketball team =

Intercollegiate basketball season

2021–22 Tennessee Lady Volunteers basketball

NCAA tournament, Sweet Sixteen
- Conference: Southeastern Conference

Ranking
- Coaches: No. 17
- AP: No. 18
- Record: 25–9 (11–5 SEC)
- Head coach: Kellie Harper (3rd season)
- Assistant coaches: Samantha Willams; Jon Harper; Joy McCorvey
- Home arena: Thompson–Boling Arena

2021–22 SEC women's basketball standings
	Conf.				Overall
Team	W		L	PCT	W		L	PCT
No. 1 South Carolina	15	–	1	.938	35	–	2	.946
No. 9 LSU	13	–	3	.813	26	–	6	.813
No. 18 Tennessee	11	–	5	.688	25	–	9	.735
Ole Miss	10	–	6	.625	23	–	9	.719
Florida	10	–	6	.625	21	–	11	.656
Georgia	9	–	7	.563	21	–	10	.677
No. 15 Kentucky †	8	–	8	.500	19	–	12	.613
Missouri	7	–	9	.438	18	–	13	.581
Arkansas	7	–	9	.438	18	–	14	.563
Alabama	6	–	10	.375	20	–	14	.588
Mississippi State	6	–	10	.375	15	–	14	.517
Texas A&M	4	–	12	.250	14	–	15	.483
Vanderbilt	4	–	12	.250	16	–	19	.457
Auburn	2	–	14	.125	10	–	18	.357
† 2022 SEC tournament winner Rankings from AP poll

The 2021–22 Tennessee Lady Volunteers basketball team represented the University of Tennessee in the 2021–22 college basketball season. Led by former Lady Vol Kellie Harper, in her third year as head coach, the team played their games at Thompson–Boling Arena and were members of the Southeastern Conference.

== Previous season ==
The 2020–21 team finished the season 17–8, 9–4 in third place in SEC play. They lost in the semifinals of the SEC tournament to South Carolina. They also received an at-large bid to the NCAA tournament, where they lost in the second round to Michigan.

== Roster ==
2021–22 Tennessee Lady Volunteers women's basketball team
Players
Coaches

Pos.	#	Name	Height	Year	Previous school	Hometown
G	0	Brooklynn Miles	5 ft 4 in (1.63 m)	Fr	Franklin County HS	Frankfort, KY
G/F	1	Sara Puckett	6 ft 2 in (1.88 m)	Fr	Muscle Shoals HS	Muscle Shoals, AL
F	2	Alexus Dye	6 ft 0 in (1.83 m)	Sr	Gulf Coast State College	Birmingham, AL
G	4	Jordan Walker	5 ft 8 in (1.73 m)	RS Sr	Western Michigan University	Muskegon, MI
G	5	Kaiya Wynn	6 ft 0 in (1.83 m)	Fr	Foster HS	Richmond, TX
G	10	Jessie Rennie	5 ft 6 in (1.68 m)	Jr	Bendigo Senior Secondary College	Bendigo, AUS
F	11	Karoline Striplin	6 ft 3 in (1.91 m)	Fr	Geneva HS	Hartford, AL
G/F	12	Rae Burrell	6 ft 1 in (1.85 m)	Sr	Liberty HS	Henderson, NV
F/C	13	Keyen Green	6 ft 1 in (1.85 m)	RS Sr	Liberty University	Philadelphia, PA
C	20	Tamari Key	6 ft 5 in (1.96 m)	Jr	Cary HS	Cary, NC
G/F	21	Tess Darby	6 ft 1 in (1.85 m)	So	Greenfield HS	Greenfield, TN
G	25	Jordan Horston	6 ft 2 in (1.88 m)	Jr	Columbus Africentric Early College	Columbus, OH
C	31	Emily Saunders	6 ft 5 in (1.96 m)	Jr	Wyoming East HS	Mullens, WV
G/F	33	Marta Suárez (injured)	6 ft 2 in (1.88 m)	So	Joaquim Blume Institute	Oviedo, Spain

Head coach

- Kellie Harper (Tennessee)

Assistant coach(es)

- Samantha Williams (Auburn)
- Jon Harper (Auburn)
- Joy McCorvey (St. John's)

Legend

- (C) Team captain
- (S) Suspended
- (I) Ineligible
- (W) Walk-on
- Injured
- Current redshirt

Roster

== Schedule ==
Date time, TV	Rank^{#}	Opponent^{#}	Result	Record	High points	High rebounds	High assists	Site (attendance) city, state
Exhibition
11/3/2021*; 6:30 pm, SECN+	No. 15	Georgia College; Exhibition	W 108–44	–	18 – Burrell	5 – Tied	5 – Miles	Thompson–Boling Arena (6,027); Knoxville, TN
Regular season
11/10/2021*; 7:00 pm, SECN	No. 15	Southern Illinois	W 59–49	1–0	14 – Walker	13 – Dye	3 – Walker	Thompson–Boling Arena (5,951); Knoxville, TN
11/12/2021*; 6:00 pm, ESPN+	No. 15	at UCF	W 49–41	2–0	14 – Horston	11 – Horston	3 – Tied	Addition Financial Arena (2,819); Orlando, FL
11/15/2021*; 6:30 pm, SECN+	No. 16	No. 23 South Florida	W 52–49	3–0	24 – Horston	10 – Key	4 – Horston	Thompson–Boling Arena (6,017); Knoxville, TN
11/21/2021*; 1:00 pm, ESPN	No. 16	No. 12 Texas	W 74–70 ^{OT}	4–0	28 – Horston	18 – Key	5 – Walker	Thompson–Boling Arena (9,460); Knoxville, TN
11/26/2021*; 6:30 pm	No. 11	vs. Kansas; South Point Thanksgiving Shootout	W 68–58	5–0	14 – Horston	11 – Horston	3 – Tied	South Point Arena; Enterprise, NV
11/27/2021*; 6:30 pm	No. 11	vs. Oklahoma State; South Point Thanksgiving Shootout	W 80–55	6–0	17 – Horston	11 – Key	9 – Horston	South Point Arena; Enterprise, NV
12/1/2021*; 6:30 pm, SECN+	No. 11	Tennessee Tech	W 76–48	7–0	20 – Dye	11 – Key	6 – Horston	Thompson–Boling Arena (6,374); Knoxville, TN
12/5/2021*; 2:00 pm, ACCN	No. 11	at Virginia Tech	W 64–58	8–0	17 – Walker	12 – Key	6 – Miles	Cassell Coliseum (2,631); Blacksburg, VA
12/12/2021*; 2:00 pm, SECN+	No. 9	Georgia State	W 84–60	9–0	16 – Key	11 – Key	3 – Tied	Thompson–Boling Arena (6,312); Knoxville, TN
12/18/2021*; 5:15 pm, ESPN2	No. 7т	No. 3 Stanford; Rivalry	L 63–74	9–1	19 – Horston	12 – Horston	5 – Horston	Thompson–Boling Arena (10,017); Knoxville, TN
12/20/2021*; 6:30 pm, SECN+	No. 7	ETSU	W 112–58	10–1	19 – Puckett	11 – Dye	5 – Tied	Thompson–Boling Arena (6,807); Knoxville, TN
12/27/2021*; 6:30 pm, SECN+	No. 7	Chattanooga	W 91–41	11–1	18 – Key	9 – Striplin	8 – Walker	Thompson–Boling Arena (7,252); Knoxville, TN
12/30/2021; 6:30 pm, SECN+	No. 7	Alabama	W 62–44	12–1 (1–0)	16 – Walker	11 – Key	6 – Walker	Thompson–Boling Arena (8,124); Knoxville, TN
1/2/2022; 1:00 pm, SECN	No. 7	at Arkansas	W 70–63	13–1 (2–0)	17 – Key	10 – Dye	5 – Horston	Bud Walton Arena (3,655); Fayetteville, AR
1/6/2022; 6:30 pm, SECN	No. 7	No. 25 Texas A&M	W 73–45	14–1 (3–0)	18 – Horston	13 – Horston	5 – Walker	Thompson–Boling Arena (6,235); Knoxville, TN
1/9/2022; 1:00 pm, SECN	No. 7	at Ole Miss	W 70–58	15–1 (4–0)	20 – Horston	11 – Horston	4 – Walker	SJB Pavilion (2,713); Oxford, MS
1/13/2022; 9:00 pm, SECN	No. 5	at Vanderbilt; Rivalry	W 65–51	16–1 (5–0)	16 – Horston	13 – Horston	5 – Horston	Memorial Gymnasium (2,489); Nashville, TN
1/16/2022; 3:00 pm, ESPN	No. 5	No. 19 Kentucky; Rivalry	W 84–58	17–1 (6–0)	14 – Tied	7 – Tied	5 – Horston	Thompson–Boling Arena (10,012); Knoxville, TN
1/23/2022; 2:00 pm, SECN	No. 5	at No. 13 Georgia	W 63–55	18–1 (7–0)	19 – Horston	11 – Horston	4 – Horston	Stegeman Coliseum (5,117); Athens, GA
1/27/2022; 8:00 pm, SECN+	No. 4	at Auburn	L 61–71	18–2 (7–1)	21 – Horston	9 – Dye	4 – Burrell	Auburn Arena (2,314); Auburn, AL
1/31/2022; 7:00 pm, SECN	No. 7	Arkansas	W 86–83 ^{OT}	19–2 (8–1)	24 – Horston	11 – Horston	6 – Tied	Thompson–Boling Arena (7,071); Knoxville, TN
2/3/2022; 6:00 pm, SECN	No. 7	at Florida	L 59–84	19–3 (8–2)	10 – Dye	8 – Key	3 – Miles	O'Connell Center (3,809); Gainesville, FL
2/6/2022*; Noon, FOX	No. 7	at No. 10 UConn; Rivalry	L 56–75	19–4	26 – Horston	8 – Horston	3 – Horston	XL Center (13,719); Hartford, CT
2/10/2022; 6:30 pm, SECN	No. 13	Missouri	W 76–62	20–4 (9–2)	21 – Horston	13 – Horston	5 – Horston	Thompson–Boling Arena (6,468); Knoxville, TN
2/13/2022; Noon, SECN	No. 13	Vanderbilt; Rivalry	W 66–52	21–4 (10–2)	16 – Horston	13 – Horston	7 – Horston	Thompson–Boling Arena (8,933); Knoxville, TN
2/17/2022; 7:00 pm, SECN+	No. 12	at Alabama	L 64–74	21–5 (10–3)	20 – Key	13 – Key	5 – Horston	Coleman Coliseum (2,001); Tuscaloosa, AL
2/20/2022; 1:00 pm, ABC	No. 12	at No. 1 South Carolina; College GameDay	L 53–67	21–6 (10–4)	14 – Burrell	11 – Dye	2 – Dye	Colonial Life Arena (18,000); Columbia, SC
2/24/2022; 6:30 pm, SECN+	No. 16	Mississippi State	W 86–64	22–6 (11–4)	23 – Key	15 – Key	7 – Walker	Thompson–Boling Arena (7,009); Knoxville, TN
2/27/2022; 2:00 pm, ESPN2	No. 16	No. 8 LSU	L 54–57	22–7 (11–5)	12 – Key	9 – Key	3 – Walker	Thompson–Boling Arena (11,613); Knoxville, TN
SEC tournament
3/4/2022; 9:30 pm, SECN	(3) No. 18	vs. (11) Alabama; Quarterfinals	W 74–59	23–7	21 – Burrell	14 – Dye	7 – Burrell	Bridgestone Arena (7,704); Nashville, TN
3/5/2022; 7:30 pm, ESPNU	(3) No. 18	vs. (7) Kentucky; Semifinals / Rivalry	L 74–83	23–8	26 – Dye	10 – Dye	10 – Walker	Bridgestone Arena (9,072); Nashville, TN
NCAA tournament
3/19/2022; 3:00 pm, ABC	(4 W) No. 18	(13 W) Buffalo; First round	W 80–67	24–8	19 – Burrell	11 – Tied	4 – Walker	Thompson–Boling Arena; Knoxville, TN
3/21/2022; 7:00 pm, ESPN2	(4 W) No. 18	(12 W) Belmont; Second round	W 70–67	25–8	20 – Dye	11 – Dye	8 – Walker	Thompson–Boling Arena (5,484); Knoxville, TN
3/26/2022; 4:00 pm, ESPN2	(4 W) No. 18	vs. (1 W) No. 4 Louisville; Sweet Sixteen	L 64–76	25–9	22 – Burrell	10 – Key	4 – Walker	Intrust Bank Arena; Wichita, KS
*Non-conference game. ^{#}Rankings from AP Poll. (#) Tournament seedings in parentheses. W=Wichita. All times are in Eastern Time. 2021–22 Schedule

== Rankings ==
Ranking movements Legend: ██ Increase in ranking ██ Decrease in ranking
	Week																				
Poll	Pre	1	2	3	4	5	6	7	8	9	10	11	12	13	14	15	16	17	18	19	Final
AP	15	15	16	11	11	9	7	7	7	7	5	5	4	7	13	12	16	18	19		
Coaches	12	12^	10	10	9	9	10	9	8	8	6	6	5	7	10	8	14	15	17		

^Coaches' Poll did not release a second poll at the same time as the AP.
