= 2021–22 LSU Tigers women's basketball team =

Intercollegiate basketball season

2021–22 LSU Tigers women's basketball

NCAA tournament, second round
- Conference: Southeastern Conference

Ranking
- Coaches: No. 9
- AP: No. 9
- Record: 26–6 (13–3 SEC)
- Head coach: Kim Mulkey (1st season)
- Assistant coaches: Sytia Messer; Daphne Mitchell; Kaylin Rice
- Home arena: Pete Maravich Assembly Center

2021–22 SEC women's basketball standings
	Conf.				Overall
Team	W		L	PCT	W		L	PCT
No. 1 South Carolina	15	–	1	.938	35	–	2	.946
No. 9 LSU	13	–	3	.813	26	–	6	.813
No. 18 Tennessee	11	–	5	.688	25	–	9	.735
Ole Miss	10	–	6	.625	23	–	9	.719
Florida	10	–	6	.625	21	–	11	.656
Georgia	9	–	7	.563	21	–	10	.677
No. 15 Kentucky †	8	–	8	.500	19	–	12	.613
Missouri	7	–	9	.438	18	–	13	.581
Arkansas	7	–	9	.438	18	–	14	.563
Alabama	6	–	10	.375	20	–	14	.588
Mississippi State	6	–	10	.375	15	–	14	.517
Texas A&M	4	–	12	.250	14	–	15	.483
Vanderbilt	4	–	12	.250	16	–	19	.457
Auburn	2	–	14	.125	10	–	18	.357
† 2022 SEC tournament winner Rankings from AP poll

The 2021–22 LSU Tigers women's basketball team represented Louisiana State University during the 2021–22 NCAA Division I women's basketball season. The Lady Tigers, led by first-year head coach Kim Mulkey, played their home games at the Pete Maravich Assembly Center and competed as members of the Southeastern Conference (SEC).

== Previous season ==
The Tigers finished the season 9–13 (6–8 SEC) to finish in eighth in the conference. Head coach Nikki Fargas resigned at the end of the season to become president of the Las Vegas Aces. Baylor head coach Kim Mulkey was hired to replace her.

== Offseason ==
=== Departures ===
LSU Departures
Name	Number	Pos.	Height	Year	Hometown	Notes
Tiara Young	2	G	5'8"	Sophomore	Shreveport, LA	Transferred to Houston
Destini Lombard	4	G	5'9"	Freshman	New Iberia, LA	Transferred to Stephen F. Austin
Treasure Thompson	12	F	6'2"	Freshman	Joliet, IL	Transferred to Eastern Michigan
Domonique Davis	21	G	5'6"	Sophomore	DeRidder, LA	Transferred to Southern Miss
Amirah O'Neal	22	F	6'1"	Freshman	Los Angeles, CA	Transferred to Texas Southern
Karli Seay	23	G	5'7"	Senior	Flossmoor, IL	Transferred to Florida Gulf Coast
Rakell Spencer	25	G	5'10"	Senior	New Orleans, LA	Graduated
Jalaysha Thomas	32	F	6'0"	Junior	Ocala, FL	Left team
Sharna Ayres	35	G	5'10"	Freshman	Melbourne, Australia	Transferred to Northwestern State

=== 2021 recruiting class ===
College recruiting information
Name	Hometown	School	Height	Weight	Commit date
Amani Bartlett; F	Cleveland, TX	Houston Christian HS	6 ft 3 in (1.91 m)	N/A	
Amani Bartlett; F	Recruit ratings: ESPN: (93)				
Grace Hall; F	Homewood, IL	Homewood-Flossmoor HS	6 ft 1 in (1.85 m)	N/A	
Grace Hall; F	Recruit ratings: ESPN: (91)				
Logyn McNeil; F	Rockwall, TX	Rockwall-Heath HS	6 ft 3 in (1.91 m)	N/A	
Logyn McNeil; F	Recruit ratings: ESPN: (90)				
Timia Ware; G	Chicago, IL	Whitney Young Magnet HS	6 ft 3 in (1.91 m)	N/A	
Timia Ware; G	Recruit ratings: ESPN: (90)				
Overall recruit ranking:
Note: In many cases, Scout, Rivals, 247Sports, On3, and ESPN may conflict in their listings of height and weight.; In these cases, the average was taken. ESPN grades are on a 100-point scale.; Sources:

=== Incoming transfers ===
LSU incoming transfers
Name	Number	Pos.	Height	Year	Hometown	Previous school
Autumn Newby	0	F	6'2"	Graduate Student	Lawrenceville, GA	Vanderbilt
Hannah Gusters	20	C	6'5"	Sophomore	Dallas, TX	Baylor
Alexis Morris	45	G	5'6"	Senior	Beaumont, TX	Texas A&M

== Roster ==
2021–22 LSU Tigers women's basketball team
Players
Coaches

Pos.	#	Name	Height	Year	Previous school	Hometown
F	0	Autumn Newby	6 ft 2 in (1.88 m)	RS Sr	Archer HS; Vanderbilt	Lawrenceville, GA
G	1	Jailin Cherry	5 ft 8 in (1.73 m)	RS Sr	Pascagoula HS	Pascagoula, MS
G	3	Khayla Pointer	5 ft 7 in (1.7 m)	RS Sr	Holy Innocents' Episcopal School	Marietta, GA
G	10	Ryann Payne	5 ft 7 in (1.7 m)	Sr	Sierra Canyon School; TCU	Valencia, CA
F	11	Emily Ward	5 ft 11 in (1.8 m)	Jr	Benton HS	Bossier City, LA
F	13	Logyn McNeil	6 ft 3 in (1.91 m)	Fr	Rockwall-Heath HS	Rockwall, TX
G/F	14	Sarah Shematsi	6 ft 2 in (1.88 m)	Sr	Lycée Bellevue; South Plains College	Annecy, France
F	15	Ajae Petty	6 ft 3 in (1.91 m)	So	Baltimore Polytechnic Institute	Baltimore, MD
C	20	Hannah Gusters	6 ft 5 in (1.96 m)	So	MacArthur HS; Baylor	Dallas, TX
G	21	Timia Ware	5 ft 6 in (1.68 m)	Fr	Whitney Young Magnet HS	Chicago, IL
F	23	Amani Bartlett	6 ft 3 in (1.91 m)	Fr	Houston Christian HS	Cleveland, TX
C	24	Faustine Aifuwa	6 ft 5 in (1.96 m)	RS Sr	Dacula HS	Dacula, GA
F	30	Grace Hall	6 ft 1 in (1.85 m)	Fr	Homewood-Flossmoor HS	Homewood, IL
F	32	Awa Trasi	6 ft 1 in (1.85 m)	RS Sr	Lycée Jeanne D'Arc; Northwest Florida State College	Toulouse, France
G	45	Alexis Morris	5 ft 6 in (1.68 m)	RS Sr	Legacy Christian Academy; Texas A&M	Beaumont, TX

Head coach

- Kim Mulkey (Louisiana Tech)

Assistant coach(es)

- Sytia Messer (Arkansas)
- Daphne Mitchell (Georgia Tech)
- Kaylin Rice (Baylor)

Legend

- (C) Team captain
- (S) Suspended
- (I) Ineligible
- (W) Walk-on
- Injured
- Current redshirt

Roster

== Schedule ==
Date time, TV	Rank^{#}	Opponent^{#}	Result	Record	High points	High rebounds	High assists	Site (attendance) city, state
Non-conference pre-season
October 30, 2021*; 2:00 pm, SECN+		Langston	W 112–48		22 – Pointer	16 – Newby	6 – Pointer	Pete Maravich Assembly Center (1,076); Baton Rouge, LA
November 4, 2021*; 6:00 pm, SECN+		Loyola New Orleans	W 87–49		24 – Pointer	12 – Newby	5 – Payne	Pete Maravich Assembly Center (617); Baton Rouge, LA
Non-conference regular season
November 9, 2021*; 11:00 am, SECN+		Nicholls	W 82–40	1–0	19 – Gusters	11 – Tied	13 – Pointer	Pete Maravich Assembly Center (5,357); Baton Rouge, LA
November 14, 2021*; 12:30 pm, SECN+		Florida Gulf Coast	L 74–88	1–1	23 – Pointer	10 – Pointer	5 – Pointer	Pete Maravich Assembly Center (6,091); Baton Rouge, LA
November 18, 2021*; 6:00 pm		at Louisiana	W 70–41	2–1	17 – Trasi	12 – Newby	3 – Pointer	Cajundome (2,711); Lafayette, LA
November 23, 2021*; 6:00 pm, SECN+		Tulane	W 75–58	3–1	17 – Aifuwa	9 – Newby	6 – Pointer	Pete Maravich Assembly Center (5,882); Baton Rouge, LA
November 26, 2021*; 1:30 pm		vs. New Mexico State; San Juan Shootout	W 72–52	4–1	20 – Pointer	8 – Aifuwa	3 – Payne	Roberto Clemente Coliseum (200); San Juan, Puerto Rico
November 27, 2021*; 11:15 am		vs. Missouri State; San Juan Shootout	W 66–58	5–1	25 – Pointer	10 – Newby	3 – Payne	Roberto Clemente Coliseum (200); San Juan, Puerto Rico
December 2, 2021*; 8:00 pm, ESPN2		No. 14 Iowa State; Big 12/SEC Challenge	W 69–60	6–1	25 – Morris	6 – Pointer	7 – Pointer	Pete Maravich Assembly Center (5,810); Baton Rouge, LA
December 12, 2021*; 1:00 pm, SECN+	No. 24	Texas Southern	W 96–55	7–1	14 – Aifuwa	7 – Newby	7 – Payne	Pete Maravich Assembly Center (6,072); Baton Rouge, LA
December 15, 2021*; 6:00 pm, SECN	No. 22	Alcorn State	W 100–36	8–1	19 – Pointer	10 – Pointer	4 – Pointer	Pete Maravich Assembly Center (5,408); Baton Rouge, LA
December 18, 2021*; 12:00 pm, SECN+	No. 22	Bradley	W 77–51	9–1	17 – Morris	11 – Aifuwa	5 – Morris	Pete Maravich Assembly Center (5,624); Baton Rouge, LA
December 20, 2021*; 4:45 pm, FloHoops	No. 21	vs. Clemson; West Palm Beach Invitational	W 70–56	10–1	20 – Pointer	11 – Aifuwa	8 – Pointer	Student Life Center (1,208); West Palm Beach, FL
December 21, 2021*; 2:30 pm, FloHoops	No. 21	vs. Texas Tech; West Palm Beach Invitational	W 74–60	11–1	19 – Pointer	12 – Newby	7 – Pointer	Student Life Center; West Palm Beach, FL
December 27, 2021*; 6:00 pm, SECN+	No. 19	Samford	W 83–47	12–1	22 – Cherry	11 – Pointer	8 – Pointer	Pete Maravich Assembly Center (6,614); Baton Rouge, LA
SEC regular season
December 30, 2021; 6:00 pm, SECN+	No. 19	at No. 13 Georgia	W 68–62	13–1 (1–0)	21 – Pointer	10 – Newby	6 – Morris	Stegeman Coliseum (3,241); Athens, GA
January 2, 2022; 2:00 pm, SECN+	No. 19	No. 23 Texas A&M	W 75–66	14–1 (2–0)	30 – Morris	10 – Newby	8 – Pointer	Pete Maravich Assembly Center (7,400); Baton Rouge, LA
January 6, 2022; 7:00 pm, SECN+	No. 13	No. 1 South Carolina	L 60–66	14–2 (2–1)	22 – Pointer	6 – Cherry	6 – Pointer	Pete Maravich Assembly Center (9,190); Baton Rouge, LA
January 9, 2022; 4:00 pm, SECN	No. 13	at Auburn	W 76–48	15–2 (3–1)	24 – Pointer	10 – Pointer	6 – Pointer	Auburn Arena (2,308); Auburn, AL
January 13, 2022; 7:00 pm, SECN+	No. 12	Missouri	W 87–85 ^{OT}	16–2 (4–1)	21 – Pointer	12 – Newby	9 – Cherry	Pete Maravich Assembly Center (5,964); Baton Rouge, LA
January 16, 2022; 12:00 pm, SECN	No. 12	Vanderbilt	W 82–64	17–2 (5–1)	20 – Tied	9 – Cherry	8 – Cherry	Pete Maravich Assembly Center (6,853); Baton Rouge, LA
January 23, 2022; 1:00 pm, SECN+	No. 11	at Florida	L 72–73	17–3 (5–2)	35 – Pointer	11 – Newby	3 – Cherry	O'Connell Center (1,478); Gainesville, FL
January 27, 2022; 7:30 pm, SECN	No. 12	at Arkansas	L 76–90	17–4 (5–3)	22 – Morris	9 – Newby	7 – Pointer	Bud Walton Arena (3,574); Fayetteville, AR
January 30, 2022; 1:00 pm, SECN	No. 12	Kentucky	W 78–69	18–4 (6–3)	28 – Pointer	8 – Aifuwa	6 – Cherry	Pete Maravich Assembly Center (8,734); Baton Rouge, LA
February 7, 2022; 6:00 pm, SECN	No. 14	at Ole Miss	W 68–64	19–4 (7–3)	20 – Aifuwa	14 – Aifuwa	10 – Pointer	SJB Pavilion (2,209); Oxford, MS
February 10, 2022; 7:30 pm, SECN	No. 14	No. 17 Georgia	W 73–67	20–4 (8–3)	26 – Morris	9 – Newby	6 – Morris	Pete Maravich Assembly Center (6,943); Baton Rouge, LA
February 13, 2022; 2:00 pm, SECN+	No. 14	at Texas A&M	W 74–58	21–4 (9–3)	25 – Tied	13 – Newby	3 – Tied	Reed Arena (5,278); College Station, TX
February 17, 2022; 6:00 pm, SECN+	No. 11	at Mississippi State	W 71–59	22–4 (10–3)	23 – Morris	12 – Tied	4 – Pointer	Humphrey Coliseum (4,601); Starkville, MS
February 20, 2022; 3:00 pm, SECN	No. 11	No. 17 Florida	W 66–61	23–4 (11–3)	20 – Morris	8 – Tied	3 – Tied	Pete Maravich Assembly Center (13,620); Baton Rouge, LA
February 24, 2022; 7:00 pm, SECN+	No. 8	Alabama	W 58–50	24–4 (12–3)	23 – Pointer	9 – Pointer	8 – Pointer	Pete Maravich Assembly Center (7,421); Baton Rouge, LA
February 27, 2022; 1:00 pm, ESPN2	No. 8	at No. 16 Tennessee	W 57–54	25–4 (13–3)	14 – Cherry	14 – Pointer	5 – Tied	Thompson–Boling Arena (11,613); Knoxville, TN
SEC Tournament
March 4, 2022; 6:00 pm, SECN	(2) No. 6	vs. (7) Kentucky; Quarterfinals	L 63–78	25–5	27 – Pointer	8 – Tied	7 – Pointer	Bridgestone Arena (7,704); Nashville, TN
NCAA tournament
March 19, 2022; 4:00 pm, ESPNU	(3 S) No. 9	(14 S) Jackson State; First Round	W 83–77	26–5	26 – Pointer	14 – Aifuwa	8 – Pointer	Pete Maravich Assembly Center; Baton Rouge, LA
March 21, 2022; 7:00 pm, ESPN2	(3 S) No. 9	(6 S) No. 14 Ohio State; Second Round	L 64–79	26–6	32 – Pointer	10 – Newby	4 – Pointer	Pete Maravich Assembly Center (8,135); Baton Rouge, LA
*Non-conference game. ^{#}Rankings from AP Poll. (#) Tournament seedings in parentheses. All times are in Central Time.

== See also ==
- 2021–22 LSU Tigers men's basketball team
