= 2021–22 Baylor Bears women's basketball team =

American college basketball season

2021–22 Baylor Bears women's basketball

Big 12 regular season champions

NCAA tournament, second round
- Conference: Big 12 Conference

Ranking
- Coaches: No. 11
- AP: No. 7
- Record: 28–7 (15–3 Big 12)
- Head coach: Nicki Collen (1st season)
- Assistant coaches: Tari Cummings (1st season); Tony Greene (1st season); Chloe Pavlech (1st season)
- Home arena: Ferrell Center

2021–22 Big 12 Conference women's basketball standings
	Conf.				Overall
Team	W		L	PCT	W		L	PCT
No. 7 Baylor	15	–	3	.833	28	–	7	.800
No. 10 Iowa State	14	–	4	.778	28	–	7	.800
No. 6 Texas †	13	–	5	.722	29	–	7	.806
No. 22 Oklahoma	12	–	6	.667	25	–	9	.735
Kansas	11	–	7	.611	21	–	10	.677
Kansas State	9	–	9	.500	20	–	13	.606
West Virginia	7	–	11	.389	15	–	15	.500
Texas Tech	4	–	14	.222	11	–	19	.367
Oklahoma State	3	–	15	.167	9	–	20	.310
TCU	2	–	16	.111	6	–	22	.214
† 2022 Big 12 Tournament winner Rankings from AP poll

The 2021–22 Baylor Bears women's basketball team represented Baylor University in the 2021–22 NCAA Division I women's basketball season. The Bears, members of the Big 12 Conference, played their home games at the Ferrell Center in Waco, Texas and were led by first-year head coach Nicki Collen.

This was the first season in which the terms "men's" and "women's" were needed to distinguish Baylor's basketball teams. Before this season, Baylor women's basketball had used the nickname "Lady Bears", but on September 3, 2021, the school announced that basketball, soccer, and volleyball, the last three Baylor women's sports still using "Lady", would use only "Bears" from that point forward.

== Previous season ==
The Lady Bears finished the 2020–21 season with a record of 28–3, 17–1 in Big 12 to win the Big 12 regular season title. They won the Big 12 women's tournament after defeating TCU, Texas, and West Virginia. In the NCAA tournament, they defeated Jackson State in the first round, Virginia Tech in the second round, and Michigan in the Sweet Sixteen, before falling to UConn in the Elite Eight.

== Offseason ==
On April 25, it was announced that Kim Mulkey had been hired as the new head coach at LSU, after serving in the position at Baylor for 21 years. On May 3, Atlanta Dream head coach Nicki Collen was announced as Mulkey's replacement.

=== Departures ===
Baylor Departures
Name	Number	Pos.	Height	Year	Hometown	Reason for Departure
DiDi Richards	2	G	6'1"	Senior	Converse, TX	Graduated, declared for WNBA draft
Trinity Oliver	3	G	5'9"	(redshirt) Junior	Euless, TX	Transferred to Washington
Jordyn Oliver	11	F	5'10"	Sophomore	Prosper, TX	Transferred to Duke
Moon Ursin	12	G	5'6"	Senior	Destrehan, LA	Graduated, Transferred to Tulane
Hannah Gusters	20	C	6'5"	Freshman	Dallas, TX	Transferred to LSU
DiJonai Carrington	21	G	5'11"	Graduate	San Diego, CA	Graduated, declared for WNBA draft

== Roster ==
2021–22 Baylor Bears women's basketball team
Players
Coaches

Pos.	#	Name	Height	Year	Previous school	Hometown
F	1	NaLyssa Smith	6 ft 2 in (1.88 m)	Jr	East Central HS	Converse, TX
G	3	Jordan Lewis	5 ft 7 in (1.7 m)	GS	Alabama	Windermere, FL
C	4	Queen Egbo	6 ft 3 in (1.91 m)	Sr	Travis HS	Houston, TX
G	10	Jaden Owens	5 ft 8 in (1.73 m)	Jr	UCLA	Plano, TX
G	21	Ja'Mee Asberry	5 ft 5 in (1.65 m)	Sr	Oklahoma State	Tulsa, OK
G	22	Kamaria McDaniel	5 ft 10 in (1.78 m)	GS	Penn State	Inkster, MI
G	24	Sarah Andrews	5 ft 6 in (1.68 m)	So	MacArthur HS	Irving, TX
F	25	Kendra Gillispie	6 ft 2 in (1.88 m)	Fr	Harding Charter Prep HS	Norman, OK
F	51	Caitlin Bickle	6 ft 0 in (1.83 m)	Sr	Cactus Shadows HS	Cave Creek, AZ

Head coach

- Nicki Collen (Marquette)

Assistant coach(es)

- Tari Cummings (Oklahoma State)
- Tony Greene (Langston)
- Chloe Pavlech (Maryland)

Legend

- (C) Team captain
- (S) Suspended
- (I) Ineligible
- (W) Walk-on
- Injured
- Current redshirt

Roster

== Schedule and results ==
Date time, TV	Rank^{#}	Opponent^{#}	Result	Record	High points	High rebounds	High assists	Site (attendance) city, state
Exhibition
October 27, 2021*; 7:00 p.m.	No. 7	Texas A&M–Commerce	W 88–52		27 – Smith	15 – Smith	6 – Lewis	Ferrell Center (4,052); Waco, TX
November 3, 2021*; 7:00 p.m.	No. 7	West Texas A&M	W 92–37		34 – Smith	8 – Smith	6 – Bickle	Ferrell Center (3,971); Waco, TX
Regular Season
November 9, 2021*; 7:00 p.m., ESPN+	No. 7	Texas State	W 77–70	1–0	23 – Smith	11 – Egbo	7 – Lewis	Ferrell Center (4,180); Waco, TX
November 11, 2021*; 7:00 p.m., ESPN+	No. 7	at UT Arlington	W 81–54	2–0	21 – Smith	16 – Smith	4 – Lewis	College Park Center (2,182); Arlington, TX
November 15, 2021*; 7:00 p.m., ESPN+	No. 6	New Orleans	W 78–39	3–0	22 – Egbo	11 – Egbo	6 – Andrews	Ferrell Center (4,109); Waco, TX
November 21, 2021*; 12:00 p.m., BTN	No. 6	at No. 3 Maryland	L 76–79	3–1	30 – Smith	15 – Smith	15 – Andrews	Xfinity Center (8,395); College Park, MD
November 25, 2021*; 10:00 a.m., FloSports	No. 6	vs. Fordham; Cancún Challenge	W 68–45	4–1	19 – Smith	15 – Smith	6 – Lewis	Hard Rock Hotel Riviera Maya (103); Puerto Aventuras, Mexico
November 26, 2021*; 10:00 a.m., FloSports	No. 6	vs. Arizona State; Cancún Challenge	W 62–52	5–1	17 – Smith	12 – Smith	5 – Lewis	Hard Rock Hotel Riviera Maya (155); Puerto Aventuras, Mexico
November 27, 2021*; 12:30 p.m., FloSports	No. 6	vs. Houston; Cancún Challenge	W 74–58	6–1	21 – Smith	19 – Smith	9 – Andrews	Hard Rock Hotel Riviera Maya (129); Puerto Aventuras, Mexico
November 30, 2021*; 7:00 p.m., ESPN+	No. 5	Morehead State	W 73–28	7–1	20 – Andrews	16 – Egbo	4 – Tied	Ferrell Center (3,939); Waco, TX
December 4, 2021*; 7:00 p.m., ESPNU	No. 5	Missouri; Big 12/SEC Women's Challenge	W 70–68	8–1	25 – Smith	17 – Smith	7 – Lewis	Ferrell Center (4,160); Waco, TX
December 8, 2021*; 11:00 a.m., ESPN+	No. 5	Alcorn State	W 94–40	9–1	25 – Smith	10 – Smith	6 – Bickle	Ferrell Center (5,838); Waco, TX
December 19, 2021*; 12:00 p.m., ESPN	No. 5	vs. No. 13 Michigan; Naismith Women's Challenge	L 68–74 ^{OT}	9–2	21 – Smith	14 – Smith	7 – Lewis	Mohegan Sun Arena (8,204); Uncasville, CT
December 29, 2021*; 6:00 p.m., ESPN+	No. 10	North Texas	W 86–65	10–2	28 – Smith	11 – Tied	7 – Lewis	Ferrell Center (4,158); Waco, TX
January 2, 2022; 1:00 p.m., ESPN+	No. 10	at Kansas State	L 59–68	10–3 (0–1)	14 – Tied	7 – Smith	4 – Lewis	Bramlage Coliseum (2,393); Manhattan, KS
January 5, 2022; 7:00 p.m., ESPN+	No. 14	TCU	Postponed due to COVID-19 protocols from Baylor					Ferrell Center; Waco, TX
January 12, 2022; 6:00 p.m., BSOK	No. 14	at No. 23 Oklahoma	L 77–83	10–4 (0–2)	30 – Smith	11 – Lewis	5 – Lewis	Lloyd Noble Center (2,002); Norman, OK
January 16, 2022; 2:00 p.m., ESPN+	No. 14	Kansas	W 82–79	11–4 (1–2)	25 – Andrews	10 – Tied	8 – Lewis	Allen Fieldhouse (1,688); Lawrence, KS
January 19, 2022; 7:00 p.m., ESPN+	No. 15т	Oklahoma State	W 67–49	12–4 (2–2)	19 – Egbo	13 – Smith	7 – Lewis	Ferrell Center (4,078); Waco, TX
January 23, 2022; 2:00 p.m., ESPN2	No. 15т	No. 7 Iowa State	W 87–61	13–4 (3–2)	24 – Lewis	21 – Egbo	6 – Lewis	Ferrell Center (4,541); Waco, TX
January 26, 2022; 7:00 p.m., ESPN+	No. 11	at Texas Tech	W 88–80	14–4 (4–2)	23 – Smith	9 – Smith	3 – Asberry	United Supermarkets Arena (4,504); Lubbock, TX
January 29, 2022; 1:00 p.m., ESPN+	No. 11	at West Virginia	W 87–54	15–4 (5–2)	20 – Tied	10 – Lewis	11 – Lewis	WVU Coliseum (3,836); Morgantown, WV
February 2, 2022; 7:00 p.m., ESPN+	No. 9	No. 18 Oklahoma	L 77–78	15–5 (5–3)	23 – Andrews	12 – Smith	6 – Andrews	Ferrell Center (4,274); Waco, TX
February 4, 2022; 7:00 p.m., ESPN2	No. 9	No. 13 Texas; Rescheduled from January 9, 2022	W 75–63	16–5 (6–3)	25 – Smith	8 – Smith	8 – Andrews	Ferrell Center (5,435); Waco, TX
February 6, 2022; 3:00 p.m., ESPN2	No. 9	at No. 13 Texas	W 63–55	17–5 (7–3)	28 – Smith	13 – Smith	4 – Andrews	Frank Erwin Center (5,300); Austin, TX
February 9, 2022; 7:00 p.m., ESPN+	No. 10	Kansas State	W 95–50	18–5 (8–3)	24 – Lewis	16 – Egbo	7 – Tied	Ferrell Center (4,181); Waco, TX
February 12, 2022; 5:00 p.m., ESPN+	No. 10	West Virginia	W 75–57	19–5 (9–3)	30 – Smith	12 – Tied	7 – Andrews	Ferrell Center (5,240); Waco, TX
February 16, 2022; 7:00 p.m., ESPN+	No. 7	TCU	W 80–55	20–5 (10–3)	22 – Egbo	13 – Egbo	9 – Andrews	Ferrell Center (4,660); Waco, TX
February 19, 2022; 1:00 p.m., ESPN+	No. 7	at TCU	W 78–59	21–5 (11–3)	23 – Smith	12 – Egbo	7 – Andrews	Schollmaier Arena (2,330); Fort Worth, TX
February 23, 2022; 6:30 p.m., ESPN+	No. 5	at Oklahoma State	W 65–58	22–5 (12–3)	19 – Smith	15 – Smith	4 – Andrews	Gallagher-Iba Arena (423); Stillwater, OK
February 26, 2022; 2:00 p.m., ESPN+	No. 5	Kansas	W 85–77	23–5 (13–3)	33 – Smith	16 – Smith	8 – Lewis	Ferrell Center (5,639); Waco, TX
February 28, 2022; 6:00 p.m., ESPN2	No. 5	at No. 8 Iowa State	W 87–62	24–5 (14–3)	28 – Smith	20 – Smith	6 – Tied	Hilton Coliseum (13,907); Ames, IA
March 6, 2022; 2:00 p.m., ESPN+	No. 5	Texas Tech	W 82–57	25–5 (15–3)	35 – Smith	12 – Smith	6 – Tied	Ferrell Center (5,110); Waco, TX
Big 12 Tournament (2-1)
March 11, 2022; 1:30 p.m., ESPNU/ESPN+	(1) No. 4	vs. (9) Oklahoma State; Quarterfinals	W 76–36	26–5	16 – Asberry	13 – Egbo	5 – Lewis	Municipal Auditorium (3,642); Kansas City, MO
March 12, 2022; 12:00 p.m., ESPN+	(1) No. 4	vs. (4) No. 21 Oklahoma; Semifinals	W 91–76	27–5	37 – Smith	11 – Smith	6 – Lewis	Municipal Auditorium; Kansas City, MO
March 13, 2022; 12:00 p.m., ESPN2	(1) No. 4	vs. (3) No. 7 Texas; Championship	L 58–67	27–6	21 – Smith	10 – Smith	4 – Lewis	Municipal Auditorium (3,442); Kansas City, MO
NCAA tournament (1–1)
March 18, 2022*; 3:00 p.m., ESPN2	(2 W) No. 7	(15 W) Hawaii; First Round	W 89–49	28–6	23 – Lewis	14 – Tied	6 – Andrews	Ferrell Center; Waco, TX
March 20, 2022; 5:00 p.m., ESPN2	(2 W) No. 7	(10 W) South Dakota; Second Round	L 47–61	28–7	13 – Egbo	8 – Tied	5 – Tied	Ferrell Center (3,684); Waco, TX
*Non-conference game. ^{#}Rankings from AP Poll. (#) Tournament seedings in parentheses. All times are in Central Time.

== Rankings ==
Ranking movements Legend: ██ Increase in ranking ██ Decrease in ranking т = Tied with team above or below
	Week																				
Poll	Pre	1	2	3	4	5	6	7	8	9	10	11	12	13	14	15	16	17	18	19	Final
AP	7	6	6	6	5	5	5	10	10	14	14	15т	11	9	10	7	4	4	4	7	7
Coaches	8	8*	8	7	6	5	9	10	13	13	16	14	12	11	10	7	5	4	5	11	11

*Coaches did not release a week 1 poll.
