= 2021–22 Alabama Crimson Tide women's basketball team =

Intercollegiate basketball season

2021–22 Alabama Crimson Tide women's basketball

WNIT, Quarterfinals
- Conference: Southeastern Conference
- Record: 20–14 (6–10 SEC)
- Head coach: Kristy Curry (9th season)
- Assistant coaches: Janese Constantine; Kelly Curry; Roman Tubner
- Home arena: Coleman Coliseum

2021–22 SEC women's basketball standings
	Conf.				Overall
Team	W		L	PCT	W		L	PCT
No. 1 South Carolina	15	–	1	.938	35	–	2	.946
No. 9 LSU	13	–	3	.813	26	–	6	.813
No. 18 Tennessee	11	–	5	.688	25	–	9	.735
Ole Miss	10	–	6	.625	23	–	9	.719
Florida	10	–	6	.625	21	–	11	.656
Georgia	9	–	7	.563	21	–	10	.677
No. 15 Kentucky †	8	–	8	.500	19	–	12	.613
Missouri	7	–	9	.438	18	–	13	.581
Arkansas	7	–	9	.438	18	–	14	.563
Alabama	6	–	10	.375	20	–	14	.588
Mississippi State	6	–	10	.375	15	–	14	.517
Texas A&M	4	–	12	.250	14	–	15	.483
Vanderbilt	4	–	12	.250	16	–	19	.457
Auburn	2	–	14	.125	10	–	18	.357
† 2022 SEC tournament winner Rankings from AP poll

The 2021–22 Alabama Crimson Tide women's basketball team represented the University of Alabama during the 2021–22 NCAA Division I women's basketball season. The Crimson Tide, led by ninth-year head coach Kristy Curry, played their home games at Coleman Coliseum and competed as members of the Southeastern Conference (SEC).

== Previous season ==
The Crimson Tide finished the season 17–10 (8–8 SEC) to finish in seventh place in the conference. They received an at-large bid to the 2021 NCAA Division I women's basketball tournament, where they advanced to the Second Round, defeating North Carolina in the First Round before falling to Maryland.

== Offseason ==
=== Departures ===
Alabama Departures
Name	Number	Pos.	Height	Year	Hometown	Notes
Keyara Jones	2	G	5'6"	Junior	Heidelberg, MS	Graduated
Jordan Lewis	3	G	5'7"	RS Senior	Windermere, FL	Transferred to Baylor
Destiny Rice	11	G	5'8"	Sophomore	Shreveport, LA	Transferred to Louisiana
Ariyah Copeland	22	F	6'3"	Senior	Columbus, GA	Transferred to Arizona
De'Sha Benjamin	24	G	6'0"	Junior	Augusta, GA	Transferred to UT Arlington
Alana Busby-Dunphy	32	F	6'3"	Sophomore	Eureka, CA	Transferred to Florida A&M
Jasmine Walker	40	F	6'3"	Senior	Montgomery, AL	Drafted 7th overall by the Los Angeles Sparks

=== 2021 recruiting class ===
College recruiting information
Name	Hometown	School	Height	Weight	Commit date
Kayla Blackshear; F	Orlando, FL	Lake Highland Preparatory School	6 ft 1 in (1.85 m)	N/A	
Kayla Blackshear; F	Recruit ratings: ESPN: (91)				
Taylor Cullinan; F	Dallas, GA	North Paulding High School	6 ft 3 in (1.91 m)	N/A	
Taylor Cullinan; F	Recruit ratings: No ratings found				
Overall recruit ranking:
Note: In many cases, Scout, Rivals, 247Sports, On3, and ESPN may conflict in their listings of height and weight.; In these cases, the average was taken. ESPN grades are on a 100-point scale.; Sources:

=== Incoming transfers ===
Alabama incoming transfers
Name	Number	Pos.	Height	Year	Hometown	Previous school
JaMya Mingo-Young	2	G	5'8"	Junior	Loranger, LA	Mississippi State
Jada Rice	31	C	6'4"	Graduate Student	Suwanee, GA	NC State
Nia Daniel	32	G	5'10"	Junior	Harrisburg, NC	Gulf Coast State College
Khyla Wade-Warren	33	F	6'2"	Sophomore	Selmer, TN	Texas Tech

== Roster ==
2021–22 Alabama Crimson Tide women's basketball team
Players
Coaches

Pos.	#	Name	Height	Year	Previous school	Hometown
G	0	Ahriahna Grizzle	5 ft 9 in (1.75 m)	Jr	Bill Crothers Secondary School	Toronto, ON
G	1	Megan Abrams	5 ft 9 in (1.75 m)	Sr	Lafayette Christian Academy	Lafayette, LA
G	2	JaMya Mingo-Young	5 ft 8 in (1.73 m)	Jr	Loranger HS; Mississippi State	Loranger, LA
G	4	Taylor Sutton	5 ft 4 in (1.63 m)	Sr	Greater Atlanta Christian School; Middle Tennessee	Atlanta, GA
G	5	Hannah Barber	5 ft 6 in (1.68 m)	Sr	Homewood HS	Homewood, AL
F	12	Allie Craig Cruce	6 ft 1 in (1.85 m)	Sr	Lauderdale County HS	Killen, AL
F	13	Kayla Blackshear	6 ft 1 in (1.85 m)	Fr	Lake Highland Preparatory School	Orlando, FL
G/F	15	Myra Gordon	6 ft 0 in (1.83 m)	So	L. D. Bell HS	Fort Worth, TX
C	20	Ruth Koang	6 ft 5 in (1.96 m)	Sr	Young Women's College Prep; South Plains College	Rochester, NY
G	23	Brittany Davis	5 ft 9 in (1.75 m)	Sr	Greenville HS; Gulf Coast State College	Manchester, GA
C	31	Jada Rice	6 ft 4 in (1.93 m)	RS Sr	Collins Hill HS; NC State	Suwanee, GA
G	32	Nia Daniel	5 ft 10 in (1.78 m)	Jr	Hickory Ridge HS; Gulf Coast State College	Harrisburg, NC
F	33	Khyla Wade-Warren	6 ft 2 in (1.88 m)	So	McNairy Central HS; Texas Tech	Selmer, TN
F	45	Taylor Cullinan	6 ft 3 in (1.91 m)	Fr	North Paulding HS	Dallas, GA

Head coach

- Kristy Curry (Louisiana–Monroe)

Assistant coach(es)

- Janese Constantine (Wisconsin)
- Kelly Curry (Texas A&M)
- Roman Tubner (Centenary)

Legend

- (C) Team captain
- (S) Suspended
- (I) Ineligible
- (W) Walk-on
- Injured
- Current redshirt

Roster

== Schedule ==
Date time, TV	Rank^{#}	Opponent^{#}	Result	Record	High points	High rebounds	High assists	Site (attendance) city, state
Exhibition
November 4, 2021*; 6:00 pm		Alabama–Huntsville	W 87–41		19 – Daniel	10 – Rice	3 – Tied	Coleman Coliseum; Tuscaloosa, AL
Non-conference regular season
November 9, 2021*; 5:00 pm, SECN+		Charleston Southern	W 109–32	1–0	25 – Davis	12 – Davis	5 – Mingo-Young	Coleman Coliseum (452); Tuscaloosa, AL
November 14, 2021*; 2:00 pm, SECN+		Tulane	L 66–69	1–1	21 – Abrams	7 – Mingo-Young	3 – Tied	Coleman Coliseum (1,792); Tuscaloosa, AL
November 17, 2021*; 6:00 pm, SECN+		Southern Miss	W 86–54	2–1	23 – Davis	12 – Mingo-Young	4 – Tied	Coleman Coliseum (1,784); Tuscaloosa, AL
November 21, 2021*; 1:00 p.m., ESPN+		vs. Duke; Maggie Dixon Classic	L 71–74	2–2	27 – Abrams	7 – Abrams	3 – Mingo-Young	Schollmaier Arena (2,146); Fort Worth, TX
November 24, 2021*; 6:00 pm, SECN+		Mercer	W 55–48	3–2	17 – Abrams	9 – Davis	6 – Barber	Coleman Coliseum (792); Tuscaloosa, AL
November 26, 2021*; 2:00 pm, SECN+		Western Carolina	W 77–43	4–2	17 – Abrams	7 – Tied	5 – Barber	Coleman Coliseum (1,770); Tuscaloosa, AL
November 28, 2021*; 1:00 p.m., SECN		Bethune–Cookman	W 89–45	5–2	16 – Tied	9 – Wade-Warren	6 – Sutton	Coleman Coliseum (1,804); Tuscaloosa, AL
November 30, 2021*; 6:00 pm, SECN+		Memphis	W 71–44	6–2	14 – Tied	11 – Rice	4 – Tied	Coleman Coliseum (1,742); Tuscaloosa, AL
December 3, 2021*; 6:00 pm, SECN+		Houston	W 77–67	7–2	23 – Abrams	8 – Davis	4 – Mingo-Young	Coleman Coliseum (1,877); Tuscaloosa, AL
December 5, 2021*		at Chattanooga	W 80–64	8–2	26 – Mingo-Young	11 – Mingo-Young	3 – Barber	McKenzie Arena (1,425); Chattanooga, TN
December 13, 2021*; 11:30 am, SECN+		Sam Houston State	W 84–50	9–2	21 – Abrams	11 – Mingo-Young	4 – Barber	Coleman Coliseum (2,500); Tuscaloosa, AL
December 16, 2021*; 6:30 pm		at Little Rock	Canceled					Jack Stephens Center; Little Rock, AR
December 20, 2021*; 2:00 pm, SECN+		Winthrop	Canceled					Coleman Coliseum; Tuscaloosa, AL
SEC regular season
December 30, 2021; 5:30 p.m., SECN+		at No. 7 Tennessee	L 44–62	9–3 (0–1)	12 – Davis	8 – Tied	4 – Davis	Thompson–Boling Arena (8,124); Knoxville, TN
January 2, 2022; 4:00 pm, SECN		Auburn	W 56–53	10–3 (1–1)	14 – Mingo-Young	11 – Davis	3 – Barber	Coleman Coliseum (2,985); Tuscaloosa, AL
January 6, 2022; 6:00 pm, SECN+		Mississippi State	L 62–65	10–4 (1–2)	19 – Barber	10 – Rice	4 – Mingo-Young	Coleman Coliseum (1,922); Tuscaloosa, AL
January 9, 2022; 2:00 pm, SECN		at No. 15 Georgia	L 68–72	10–5 (1–3)	18 – Davis	5 – Mingo-Young	4 – Tied	Stegeman Coliseum (3,453); Athens, GA
January 13, 2022; 6:00 pm, SECN+		at Ole Miss	L 56–86	10–6 (1–4)	20 – Davis	7 – Davis	3 – Abrams	SJB Pavilion (1,391); Oxford, MS
January 16, 2022; 2:00 pm, SECN+		Florida	L 77–85	10–7 (1–5)	22 – Abrams	10 – Davis	2 – Tied	Coleman Coliseum (2,001); Tuscaloosa, AL
January 20, 2022; 8:00 pm, SECN		Arkansas	L 71–99	10–8 (1–6)	22 – Mingo-Young	8 – Davis	5 – Barber	Coleman Coliseum (1,911); Tuscaloosa, AL
January 23, 2022; 3:00 pm, ESPNU		at Auburn	W 75–68	11–8 (2–6)	24 – Davis	8 – Davis	3 – Tied	Auburn Arena (4,196); Auburn, AL
January 30, 2022; 5:00 pm, SECN		Missouri	L 61–77	11–9 (2–7)	15 – Mingo-Young	5 – Davis	2 – Tied	Coleman Coliseum (2,103); Tuscaloosa, AL
February 3, 2022; 6:00 pm, SECN+		at No. 1 South Carolina	L 51–83	11–10 (2–8)	20 – Davis	11 – Mingo-Young	2 – Mingo-Young	Colonial Life Arena (11,875); Columbia, SC
February 6, 2022; 2:00 pm, SECN		at Vanderbilt	W 77–71 ^{OT}	12–10 (3–8)	25 – Davis	9 – Davis	3 – Abrams	Memorial Gymnasium (1,992); Nashville, TN
February 13, 2022; 1:00 pm, SECN		Kentucky	L 63–67	12–11 (3–9)	21 – Abrams	10 – Mingo-Young	4 – Mingo-Young	Coleman Coliseum (2,049); Tuscaloosa, AL
February 17, 2022; 6:00 pm, SECN+		No. 12 Tennessee	W 74–64	13–11 (4–9)	27 – Abrams	10 – Mingo-Young	5 – Mingo-Young	Coleman Coliseum (2,001); Tuscaloosa, AL
February 20, 2022; 5:00 pm, SECN		at Texas A&M	W 81–79 ^{2OT}	14–11 (5–9)	32 – Davis	10 – Mingo–Young	5 – Barber	Reed Arena (3,825); College Station, TX
February 24, 2022; 7:00 pm, SECN+		at No. 8 LSU	L 50–58	14–12 (5–10)	18 – Davis	11 – Davis	3 – Tied	Pete Maravich Assembly Center (7,421); Baton Rouge, LA
February 27, 2022; 2:00 pm, SECN+		Vanderbilt	W 77–71	15–12 (6–10)	32 – Davis	10 – Mingo-Young	5 – Barber	Coleman Coliseum (2,328); Tuscaloosa, AL
SEC Tournament
March 2, 2022; 1:30 pm, SECN	(11)	vs. (14) Auburn; First Round	W 75–68	16–12	25 – Abrams	15 – Mingo-Young	5 – Abrams	Bridgestone Arena (6,446); Nashville, TN
March 3, 2022; 8:30 pm, SECN	(11)	vs. (6) No. 24 Georgia; Second Round	W 74–62	17–12	26 – Davis	7 – Abrams	5 – Barber	Bridgestone Arena (6,500); Nashville, TN
March 4, 2022; 8:30 pm, SECN	(11)	vs. (3) No. 18 Tennessee; Quarterfinals	L 59–74	17–13	19 – Abrams	6 – Mingo-Young	4 – Barber	Bridgestone Arena (7,704); Nashville, TN
WNIT
March 17, 2022*; 6:00 pm, ESPN3		at Troy; First Round	W 82–79	18–13	24 – Abrams	15 – Rice	5 – Davis	Trojan Arena (2,262); Troy, AL
March 21, 2022*; 6:30 pm		at Tulane; Second Round	W 81–77	19–13	22 – Davis	10 – Davis	4 – Davis	Devlin Fieldhouse (575); New Orleans, LA
March 24, 2022*; 6:00 pm, SECN+		Houston; Third Round	W 79–64	20–13	18 – Tied	8 – Davis	4 – Mingo-Young	Coleman Coliseum (739); Tuscaloosa, AL
March 27, 2022*; 5:00 pm, ESPN3		at South Dakota State; Quarterfinals	L 73–78	20–14	28 – Davis	6 – Rice	4 – Tied	Frost Arena (4,268); Brookings, SD
*Non-conference game. ^{#}Rankings from AP Poll. (#) Tournament seedings in parentheses. All times are in Central Time.

== See also ==
- 2021–22 Alabama Crimson Tide men's basketball team
