= 2021–22 Iowa State Cyclones women's basketball team =

Intercollegiate basketball season

2021–22 Iowa State Cyclones women's basketball

NCAA tournament
- Conference: Big 12 Conference

Ranking
- Coaches: No. 8
- AP: No. 10
- Record: 28–7 (14–4 Big 12)
- Head coach: Bill Fennelly (27th season)
- Assistant coaches: Jodi Steyer; Latoja Schaben; Billy Fennelly
- Home arena: Hilton Coliseum

2021–22 Big 12 Conference women's basketball standings
	Conf.				Overall
Team	W		L	PCT	W		L	PCT
No. 7 Baylor	15	–	3	.833	28	–	7	.800
No. 10 Iowa State	14	–	4	.778	28	–	7	.800
No. 6 Texas †	13	–	5	.722	29	–	7	.806
No. 22 Oklahoma	12	–	6	.667	25	–	9	.735
Kansas	11	–	7	.611	21	–	10	.677
Kansas State	9	–	9	.500	20	–	13	.606
West Virginia	7	–	11	.389	15	–	15	.500
Texas Tech	4	–	14	.222	11	–	19	.367
Oklahoma State	3	–	15	.167	9	–	20	.310
TCU	2	–	16	.111	6	–	22	.214
† 2022 Big 12 Tournament winner Rankings from AP poll

The 2021–22 Iowa State Cyclones women's basketball team represented Iowa State University during the 2021–22 NCAA Division I women's basketball season. The Cyclones were coached by Bill Fennelly, who was in his 27th season at Iowa State. They played their home games at Hilton Coliseum in Ames, Iowa as members of the Big 12 Conference.

== Previous season ==
The Cyclones finished the 2020–21 season 17–11, 12–6 in Big 12 play to finish in fourth place. The Cyclones fell in the quarterfinals of the Big 12 Tournament to fifth seed Texas. They qualified for the 2021 NCAA tournament as a seven seed, defeating 10 seed Michigan State in the first round before falling to two seed Texas A&M in the second round.

== Roster ==
2021–22 Iowa State Cyclones women's basketball team
Players
Coaches

Pos.	#	Name	Height	Year	Previous school	Hometown
F	1	Nyamer Diew	6 ft 2 in (1.88 m)	So	Butler	Marshall, MN
G	3	Denae Fritz	5 ft 11 in (1.8 m)	Fr	Maryville High School (Tennessee)	Maryville, TN
G	11	Emily Ryan	5 ft 11 in (1.8 m)	So	Central Plains	Claflin, KS
G	12	Mary Kate King	5 ft 3 in (1.6 m)	Fr	Dubuque Wahlert High School	Dubuque, IA
G	13	Maggie Espenmiller-McGraw	5 ft 10 in (1.78 m)	Jr	Southeast Polk	Indianola, IA
F	15	Izzi Zingaro	6 ft 4 in (1.93 m)	RS Fr	Caledon Academy	Bolton, Canada
G	20	Aubrey Joens	5 ft 11 in (1.8 m)	So	Iowa City	Iowa City, IA
G	21	Lexi Donarski	6 ft 0 in (1.83 m)	So	Aquinas	La Crosse, WI
G	23	Maddie Frederick	6 ft 0 in (1.83 m)	RS Jr	Tippecanoe	Tipp, OH
G	24	Ashley Joens	6 ft 1 in (1.85 m)	Sr	Iowa City	Iowa City, IA
C	25	Beatriz Jordão	6 ft 3 in (1.91 m)	Sr	South Florida	Pombal, Portugal
F	31	Morgan Kane	6 ft 3 in (1.91 m)	RS Jr	Riverton	West Jordan, UT
F	32	Maggie Vick	6 ft 2 in (1.88 m)	Fr	Lakeway Christian (TN)	Morristown, TN

Head coach

- Bill Fennelly (William Penn)

Assistant coach(es)

- Jodi Steyer (Colorado State)
- Latoja Schaben (Toledo)
- Billy Fennelly (Iowa State)

Legend

- (C) Team captain
- (S) Suspended
- (I) Ineligible
- (W) Walk-on
- Injured
- Current redshirt

Roster
Last update: January 7, 2022

== Schedule and results ==
Date time, TV	Rank^{#}	Opponent^{#}	Result	Record	Site (attendance) city, state
Exhibition
November 4, 2021*; 6:30 pm	No. 12	Wisconsin-River Falls	W 99–41		Hilton Coliseum (9,180); Ames, IA
Regular Season
November 9, 2021*; 11:00 am, ESPN+	No. 12	Omaha	W 65–38	1–0	Hilton Coliseum (9,169); Ames, IA
November 15, 2021*; 6:30 pm, ESPN+	No. 12	South Dakota State	W 75–56	2–0	Hilton Coliseum (9,335); Ames, IA
November 18, 2021*; 6:00 pm, ESPN+	No. 14	at Drake; Rivalry	W 98–76	3–0	Knapp Center (2,982); Des Moines, IA
November 21, 2021*; 12:00 pm, ESPN+	No. 14	Southern	W 96–55	4–0	Hilton Coliseum (9,317); Ames, IA
November 26, 2021*; 4:00 pm, FloHoops	No. 13	vs. Charlotte; Gulf Coast Showcase Quarterfinals	W 75–59	5–0	Hertz Arena (276); Estero, FL
November 27, 2021*; 6:30 pm, FloHoops	No. 13	vs. Penn State; Gulf Coast Showcase Semifinals	W 93–59	6–0	Hertz Arena (200); Estero, FL
November 28, 2021*; 6:30 pm, FloHoops	No. 13	vs. UMass; Gulf Coast Showcase Championship	W 76–71	7–0	Hertz Arena (200); Estero, FL
December 2, 2021*; 8:00 pm, ESPN2	No. 14	at LSU; Big 12/SEC Women's Challenge	L 60–69	7–1	Pete Maravich Assembly Center (5,810); Baton Rogue, LA
December 5, 2021*; 12:00 pm, ESPN+	No. 14	Longwood	W 94–56	8–1	Hilton Coliseum (9,542); Ames, IA
December 8, 2021*; 6:00 pm, ESPNU	No. 15	No. 12 Iowa; Iowa Corn Cy-Hawk Series	W 77–70	9–1	Hilton Coliseum (11,348); Ames, IA
December 12, 2021*; 5:00 pm, ESPN+	No. 15	Northern Iowa; Rivalry	W 70–69	10–1	Hilton Coliseum (9,728); Ames, IA
December 19, 2021*; 5:00 pm, ESPN+	No. 12	Prairie View A&M	W 108–39	11–1	Hilton Coliseum (8,580); Ames, IA
January 2, 2022; 3:00 pm, ESPNU	No. 14	West Virginia	W 88–72	12–1 (1–0)	Hilton Coliseum (9,092); Ames, IA
January 5, 2022; 6:00 pm, Bally Sports	No. 12	at No. 23 Oklahoma	W 81–71	13–1 (2–0)	Lloyd Noble Center (1,582); Norman, OK
January 8, 2022; 1:00 pm, ESPN+	No. 12	TCU	W 78–47	14–1 (3–0)	Hilton Coliseum (9,017); Ames, IA
January 11, 2022; 6:30 pm, ESPN+	No. 9	at No. 25 Kansas State	W 73–70	15–1 (4–0)	Bramlage Coliseum (2,948); Manhattan, KS
January 15, 2022; 1:00 pm, ESPN+	No. 9	at Oklahoma State	W 74–60	16–1 (5–0)	Gallagher-Iba Arena (1,937); Stillwater, OK
January 19, 2022; 6:30 pm, ESPN+	No. 7	No. 15т Texas	L 48–66	16–2 (5–1)	Hilton Coliseum (9,774); Ames, IA
January 23, 2022; 2:00 pm, ESPN2	No. 7	at No. 15т Baylor	L 61–87	16–3 (5–2)	Ferrell Center (4,541); Waco, TX
January 26, 2022; 6:30 pm, ESPN+	No. 13	Kansas	W 77–62	17–3 (6–2)	Hilton Coliseum (9,418); Ames, IA
January 29, 2022; 12:30 pm, ESPN+	No. 13	at Texas Tech	W 86–65	18–3 (7–2)	United Supermarkets Arena (4,057); Lubbock, TX
February 2, 2022; 6:30 pm, ESPN+	No. 11	No. 25 Kansas State	W 70–55	19–3 (8–2)	Hilton Coliseum (9,511); Ames, IA
February 5, 2022; 6:00 pm, ESPN+	No. 11	Oklahoma State	W 76–58	20–3 (9–2)	Hilton Coliseum (10,443); Ames, IA
February 12, 2022; 1:00 pm, ESPN+	No. 9	at TCU	W 93–70	21–3 (10–2)	Schollmaier Arena (1,811); Fort Worth, TX
February 16, 2022; 7:00 pm, LHN	No. 6	at No. 14 Texas	L 48–73	21–4 (10–3)	Frank Erwin Center (2,585); Austin, TX
February 19, 2022; 6:00 pm, ESPN+	No. 6	No. 15 Oklahoma	W 89–67	22–4 (11–3)	Hilton Coliseum (11,321); Ames, IA
February 23, 2022; 7:00 pm, ESPN+	No. 9	at Kansas	W 85–59	23–4 (12–3)	Allen Fieldhouse (2,901); Lawrence, KS
February 26, 2022; 1:00 pm, ESPN+	No. 9	Texas Tech	W 71–55	24–4 (13–3)	Hilton Coliseum (10,871); Ames, IA
February 28, 2022; 6:00 pm, ESPN2	No. 8	No. 5 Baylor	L 55–71	24–5 (13–4)	Hilton Coliseum (13,907); Ames, IA
March 5, 2022; 6:00 pm, ESPN+	No. 8	at West Virginia; Quarterfinals	W 74–57	25–5 (14–4)	WVU Coliseum (1,823); Morgantown, WV
Big 12 Tournament
March 11, 2022; 5:00 pm, ESPN+	(2) No. 10	vs. (7) West Virginia; Quarterfinals	W 66–60	26–5	Municipal Auditorium (5,163); Kansas City, MO
March 12, 2022; 3:00 pm, ESPN+	(2) No. 10	vs. (3) No. 7 Texas; Semifinals	L 73–82 ^{OT}	26–6	Municipal Auditorium (5,013); Kansas City, MO
NCAA Women's Tournament
March 18, 2022; 9:00 pm, ESPNU	(3 G) No. 10	(14 G) UT Arlington; First round	W 78–71	27–6	Hilton Coliseum (5,546); Ames, IA
March 20, 2022; 7:00 pm, ESPN2	(3 G) No. 10	(6 G) Georgia; Second round	W 67–44	28–6	Hilton Coliseum (6,283); Ames, IA
March 25, 2022; 8:30 pm, ESPN2	(3 G) No. 10	vs. (10 G) Creighton; Sweet 16	L 68–76	28–7	Greensboro Coliseum; Greensboro, NC
*Non-conference game. ^{#}Rankings from AP Poll. (#) Tournament seedings in parentheses. G=Greensboro. All times are in Central Time.

== Rankings ==
Ranking Movement Legend: ██ Increase in ranking. ██ Decrease in ranking. ██ Not ranked previous week. NR = Not ranked. RV = Received votes.
Poll	Pre	Wk 2	Wk 3	Wk 4	Wk 5	Wk 6	Wk 7	Wk 8	Wk 9	Wk 10	Wk 11	Wk 12	Wk 13	Wk 14	Wk 15	Wk 16	Wk 17	Final
AP	12	14	13	14	15	12	13	14	12	9	7	13	11	9	6	9	8	
Coaches	16	-	14	13	16	13	14	14	12	9	7	13	10	9	5	6	7	

Coaches' Poll did not release a second poll at the same time as the AP.

== See also ==
2021–22 Iowa State Cyclones men's basketball team
