= 2021–22 Kansas State Wildcats women's basketball team =

Women's college basketball season

2021–22 Kansas State Wildcats women's basketball

NCAA tournament, second round
- Conference: Big 12 Conference
- Record: 20–13 (9–9 Big 12)
- Head coach: Jeff Mittie (8th season)
- Assistant coaches: Brian Ostermann; Ebony Gilliam; Ebony Haliburton
- Home arena: Bramlage Coliseum

2021–22 Big 12 Conference women's basketball standings
	Conf.				Overall
Team	W		L	PCT	W		L	PCT
No. 7 Baylor	15	–	3	.833	28	–	7	.800
No. 10 Iowa State	14	–	4	.778	28	–	7	.800
No. 6 Texas †	13	–	5	.722	29	–	7	.806
No. 22 Oklahoma	12	–	6	.667	25	–	9	.735
Kansas	11	–	7	.611	21	–	10	.677
Kansas State	9	–	9	.500	20	–	13	.606
West Virginia	7	–	11	.389	15	–	15	.500
Texas Tech	4	–	14	.222	11	–	19	.367
Oklahoma State	3	–	15	.167	9	–	20	.310
TCU	2	–	16	.111	6	–	22	.214
† 2022 Big 12 Tournament winner Rankings from AP poll

The 2021–22 Kansas State Wildcats women's basketball team represented Kansas State University in the 2021–22 NCAA Division I women's basketball season. The Wildcats were led by eighth-year head coach Jeff Mittie. They played their home games at Bramlage Coliseum in Manhattan, Kansas and were members of the Big 12 Conference.

On January 23, 2022 against Oklahoma, junior Ayoka Lee set an NCAA women's basketball record of 61 points in a single game, breaking the previous record of 60 points.

== Previous season ==
They finished the season 9–18, 3–15 in Big 12 play to finish in a tie for ninth place. As the tenth seed in the Big 12 Tournament, they defeated Texas Tech in the First Round before losing to West Virginia in the Quarterfinals. They were not invited to the NCAA tournament or the WNIT.

== Roster ==
2021–22 Kansas State Wildcats women's basketball team
Players
Coaches

Pos.	#	Name	Height	Year	Previous school	Hometown
G	1	Savannah Simmons	6 ft 0 in (1.83 m)	Sr	The John Carroll School	Bel Air, MD
G	2	Cymone Goodrich	5 ft 10 in (1.78 m)	RS Sr	South Shore International Prep	Chicago, IL
G	3	Jaelyn Glenn	6 ft 1 in (1.85 m)	Fr	The Barstow School	Kansas City, MO
G	4	Serena Sundell	6 ft 1 in (1.85 m)	Fr	Maryville	Maryville, MO
G	5	Brylee Glenn	6 ft 0 in (1.83 m)	Fr	The Barstow School	Kansas City, MO
G	10	Malene Lind Pedersen	5 ft 11 in (1.8 m)	RS Fr	Aabyhøj IF	Aabyhøj, Denmark
G	12	Rachel Ranke	6 ft 1 in (1.85 m)	RS Sr	Eastview	Burnsville, MN
F	13	Laura Macke	6 ft 2 in (1.88 m)	Jr	Nemaha Central	Baileyville, KS
G	14	Rebekah Dallinger	5 ft 9 in (1.75 m)	So	Narrabeen Sports High School; Miles Community College	Sydney, Australia
C	15	Heavenly Greer	6 ft 3 in (1.91 m)	So	Ganesha High School; Oklahoma	Phoenix, AZ
G	23	Jada Moore	5 ft 11 in (1.8 m)	So	Regis Jesuit	Denver, CO
G	24	Emilee Ebert	6 ft 0 in (1.83 m)	Jr	Frankfort	Frankfort, KS
C	41	Taylor Lauterbach	6 ft 7 in (2.01 m)	Fr	Appleton West	Appleton, WI
C	50	Ayoka Lee	6 ft 6 in (1.98 m)	RS Jr	Byron	Byron, MN

Head coach

- Jeff Mittie (Missouri Western)

Assistant coach(es)

- Brian Ostermann (UW–La Crosse)
- Ebony Gilliam (TCU)
- Ebony Haliburton (Oral Roberts)

Legend

- (C) Team captain
- (S) Suspended
- (I) Ineligible
- (W) Walk-on
- Injured
- Current redshirt

Roster

== Schedule and results ==
Date time, TV	Rank^{#}	Opponent^{#}	Result	Record	Site (attendance) city, state
Exhibition
October 31, 2021*; 1:00 p.m.		Washburn	W 68–39	–	Bramlage Coliseum (2,395); Manhattan, KS
November 5, 2021*; 6:30 p.m.		Pittsburg State	W 101–54	–	Bramlage Coliseum (2,307); Manhattan, KS
Non-conference regular season (10–2)
November 9, 2021*; 6:30 p.m., ESPN+		Central Arkansas	W 103–40	1–0	Bramlage Coliseum (2,183); Manhattan, KS
November 12, 2021*; 6:30 p.m., ESPN+		UT Martin; Preseason WNIT	W 44–30	2–0	Bramlage Coliseum (2,209); Manhattan, KS
November 14, 2021*; 1:00 p.m., ESPN+		Western Kentucky; Preseason WNIT	W 76–44	3–0	Bramlage Coliseum (2,212); Manhattan, KS
November 15, 2021*; 6:30 p.m., ESPN+		North Carolina A&T; Preseason WNIT	W 73–49	4–0	Bramlage Coliseum (2,184); Manhattan, KS
November 19, 2021*; 6:00 p.m., ACCN		at No. 5 NC State; Preseason WNIT	L 69–90	4–1	Reynolds Coliseum (4,156); Raleigh, NC
November 23, 2021*; 6:30 p.m., ESPN+		Abilene Christian	W 93–53	5–1	Bramlage Coliseum (2,406); Manhattan, KS
November 27, 2021*; 11:00 a.m., ESPN+		Northwestern State	W 70–36	6–1	Bramlage Coliseum (2,344); Manhattan, KS
November 29, 2021*; 1:00 p.m., ESPN+		North Dakota State	W 78–57	7–1	Bramlage Coliseum (2,213); Manhattan, KS
December 3, 2021*; 6:30 p.m., SECN+		at No. 1 South Carolina; Big 12/SEC Challenge	L 44–65	7–2	Colonial Life Arena (11,657); Columbia, SC
December 8, 2021*; 5:00 p.m.		at Omaha	W 87–56	8–2	Baxter Arena (311); Omaha, NE
December 11, 2021*; 2:00 p.m.		at South Dakota State	W 79–73	9–2	Frost Arena (768); Brookings, SD
December 18, 2021*; 6:30 p.m., ESPN+		Oregon	W 68–56	10–2	Bramlage Coliseum (5,209); Manhattan, KS
December 22, 2021*; 1:00 p.m.		UIC	Cancelled		Bramlage Coliseum; Manhattan, KS
Big 12 regular season (9–9)
January 2, 2022; 1:00 p.m., ESPN+		No. 10 Baylor	W 68–59	11–2 (1–0)	Bramlage Coliseum (2,393); Manhattan, KS
January 5, 2022; 6:30 p.m., ESPN+		at Oklahoma State	W 60–49	12–2 (2–0)	Gallagher-Iba Arena (1,823); Stillwater, OK
January 8, 2022; 6:00 p.m., ESPN+		at West Virginia	W 71–61	13–2 (3–0)	WVU Coliseum (1,639); Morgantown, WV
January 11, 2021; 6:30 p.m., ESPN+	No. 25	No. 9 Iowa State	L 70–73	13–3 (3–1)	Bramlage Coliseum (2,948); Manhattan, KS
January 15, 2022; 2:00 p.m., ESPN+	No. 25	at Texas Tech	L 45–64	13–4 (3–2)	United Supermarkets Arena (5,015); Lubbock, TX
January 19, 2022; 6:30 p.m., ESPN+		Kansas; Sunflower Showdown	W 69–61	14–4 (4–2)	Bramlage Coliseum (4,027); Manhattan, KS
January 23, 2021; 1:00 p.m., ESPN+		No. 14 Oklahoma	W 94–65	15–4 (5–2)	Bramlage Coliseum (4,347); Manhattan, KS
January 26, 2022; 2:00 p.m., LHN	No. 25	at No. 9 Texas	L 48–66	15–5 (5–3)	Frank Erwin Center (2,281); Austin, TX
January 29, 2022; 6:30 p.m.	No. 25	TCU	W 63–54	16–5 (6–3)	Bramlage Coliseum (5,157); Manhattan, KS
February 2, 2022; 6:30 p.m., ESPN+	No. 25	at No. 11 Iowa State	L 55–70	16–6 (6–4)	Hilton Coliseum (9,511); Ames, IA
February 5, 2022; 6:30 p.m., ESPN+	No. 25	Texas Tech	W 82–75	17–6 (7–4)	Bramlage Coliseum (5,588); Manhattan, KS
February 9, 2022; 2:00 p.m., ESPN+		at No. 10 Baylor	L 50–95	17–7 (7–5)	Ferrell Center (4,181); Waco, TX
February 12, 2022; 6:00 p.m., ESPN+		at Kansas; Sunflower Showdown	L 51–63	17–8 (7–6)	Allen Fieldhouse (3,709); Lawrence, KS
February 20, 2022; 1:00 p.m., ESPNU		Oklahoma State	W 56–36	18–8 (8–6)	Bramlage Coliseum (5,868); Manhattan, KS
February 23, 2022; 6:30 p.m., ESPN+		No. 11 Texas	L 51–62	18–9 (8–7)	Bramlage Coliseum (3,927); Manhattan, KS
February 26, 2022; 4:00 p.m., BSOK		at No. 20 Oklahoma	L 69–72	18–10 (8–8)	Lloyd Noble Center; Norman, OK
March 2, 2022; 6:30 p.m., ESPN+		West Virginia	L 62–74 ^{2OT}	18–11 (8–9)	Bramlage Coliseum (3,478); Manhattan, KS
March 5, 2022; 1:00 p.m., ESPN+		at TCU	W 61–50	19–11 (9–9)	Schollmaier Arena (1,595); Fort Worth, TX
Big 12 Women's Tournament (0–1)
March 11, 2022; 7:30 p.m., ESPN+	(6)	vs. (3) No. 7 Texas; Quarterfinals	L 65–72	19–12	Municipal Auditorium (5,163); Kansas City, MO
NCAA tournament (1–1)
March 19, 2022; 10:30 a.m., ESPN2	(B 9)	vs. (B 8) Washington State; First round	W 50–40	20–12	Reynolds Coliseum (4,800); Raleigh, NC
March 21, 2022; 3:00 p.m., ESPN	(B 9)	at (B 1) No. 3 NC State; Second round	L 57–89	20–13	Reynolds Coliseum (4,808); Raleigh, NC
*Non-conference game. ^{#}Rankings from AP Poll / Coaches' Poll. (#) Tournament seedings in parentheses. All times are in Central Time.

== Rankings ==
2021–22 NCAA Division I women's basketball rankings

Regular season polls
Poll	Pre- Season	Week 2	Week 3	Week 4	Week 5	Week 6	Week 7	Week 8	Week 9	Week 10	Week 11	Week 12	Week 13	Week 14	Week 15	Week 16	Week 17	Week 18	Week 19	Final
AP	NR	NR	NR	NR	NR	NR	NR	NR	RV	25	RV	25	25	RV						
Coaches	NR	NR	NR	NR	RV	NR	NR	NR	RV	RV	NR	RV	RV	RV						

Legend
	Increase in ranking
	Decrease in ranking
	Not ranked previous week
(RV)	Received Votes

- Coaches did not release a week 1 poll.

== See also ==
- 2021–22 Kansas State Wildcats men's basketball team
