= 2021–22 TCU Horned Frogs women's basketball team =

Intercollegiate basketball season

2021–22 TCU Horned Frogs women's basketball
- Conference: Big 12 Conference
- Record: 6–22 (2–16 Big 12)
- Head coach: Raegan Pebley (8th season)
- Assistant coaches: Hanna Howard; Britney Brown; Abi Olajuwon
- Home arena: Schollmaier Arena

2021–22 Big 12 Conference women's basketball standings
	Conf.				Overall
Team	W		L	PCT	W		L	PCT
No. 7 Baylor	15	–	3	.833	28	–	7	.800
No. 10 Iowa State	14	–	4	.778	28	–	7	.800
No. 6 Texas †	13	–	5	.722	29	–	7	.806
No. 22 Oklahoma	12	–	6	.667	25	–	9	.735
Kansas	11	–	7	.611	21	–	10	.677
Kansas State	9	–	9	.500	20	–	13	.606
West Virginia	7	–	11	.389	15	–	15	.500
Texas Tech	4	–	14	.222	11	–	19	.367
Oklahoma State	3	–	15	.167	9	–	20	.310
TCU	2	–	16	.111	6	–	22	.214
† 2022 Big 12 Tournament winner Rankings from AP poll

The 2021–22 TCU Horned Frogs women's basketball team represented Texas Christian University in the 2021–22 NCAA Division I women's basketball season. The 2021–22 season is head coach Raegan Pebley's eighth season at TCU. The Horned Frogs were members of the Big 12 Conference and played their home games in Schollmaier Arena.

The Horned Frogs finished the season 6–22, 2–16 in Big 12 play to finish in tenth place. In the Big 12 Tournament, they lost to West Virginia in the First Round. They were not invited to the NCAA tournament or the WNIT.

== Previous season ==
The Horned Frogs finished the season 10–15, 4–14 in Big 12 play to finish in eight place. In the Big 12 Tournament, they defeated Kansas in the first round, before losing to eventual champion Baylor in the Quarterfinals. They were not invited to the NCAA tournament or the WNIT.

== Roster ==
2021–22 TCU Horned Frogs women's basketball team
Players
Coaches

Pos.	#	Name	Height	Year	Previous school	Hometown
G	0	Caroline Germond	5 ft 7 in (1.7 m)	Sr	South Plains CC	Angers, France
G	1	Aahliyah Jackson	5 ft 10 in (1.78 m)	GS	Northside	Fort Smith, AR
G	2	Tara Manumaleuga	5 ft 10 in (1.78 m)	Jr	Hillcrest Christian; Arizona	Gold Coast, QLD, Australia
G	3	Mariah Roberts	5 ft 8 in (1.73 m)	Fr	Martin	Fort Worth, TX
G/F	4	Okako Adika	6 ft 0 in (1.83 m)	Sr	Lemvig Gymnasium; Butler	Holstebro, Denmark
F	5	Yummy Morris	6 ft 3 in (1.91 m)	Sr	North Little Rock	North Little Rock, AR
G	10	Paige Bradley	5 ft 10 in (1.78 m)	Fr	Bishop Lynch	Dallas, TX
G	11	Knisha Godfrey	5 ft 9 in (1.75 m)	RS Fr	Tampa Bay Technical; Mississippi State	Tampa, FL
G	13	Tavy Diggs	6 ft 2 in (1.88 m)	Jr	Plano East	Richardson, TX
F	14	Evie Goetz	6 ft 1 in (1.85 m)	Fr	Guyer	Denton, TX
G	15	Aja Holmes	5 ft 8 in (1.73 m)	So	Steele	Cibolo, TX
G	20	Lauren Heard	5 ft 9 in (1.75 m)	GS	Guyer	Denton, TX
F	21	Daija Turner	6 ft 3 in (1.91 m)	Fr	Village Christian Academy	Fayetteville, NC
F	23	Michelle Berry	6 ft 2 in (1.88 m)	GS	Miami Country Day; Virginia Tech	Miami, Florida
C	24	Kayla Mokwuah	6 ft 4 in (1.93 m)	Sr	Wilbraham & Monson Academy; George Washington	Longmeadow, MA
F	32	Patricia Morris	6 ft 7 in (2.01 m)	Sr	Duarte; Oregon State	Duarte, CA

Head coach

- Raegan Pebley (Colorado)

Assistant coach(es)

- Hanna Howard (Portland)
- Britney Brown (Oklahoma)
- Abi Olajuwon (Oklahoma)

Legend

- (C) Team captain
- (S) Suspended
- (I) Ineligible
- (W) Walk-on
- Injured
- Current redshirt

Roster
Last update: April 22, 2022

== Schedule and results ==
Date time, TV	Rank^{#}	Opponent^{#}	Result	Record	Site (attendance) city, state
Non-conference regular season
November 9, 2021*; 6:30 p.m., ESPN+		Houston Baptist	W 78–48	1–0	Schollmaier Arena (1,310); Fort Worth, TX
November 17, 2021*; 6:00 p.m., ESPN+		at Tulane	L 78–88 ^{2OT}	1–1	Devlin Fieldhouse (438); New Orleans, LA
November 21, 2021*; 3:30 p.m., ESPN+		North Carolina; Maggie Dixon Classic	L 46–79	1–2	Schollmaier Arena (2,483); Fort Worth, TX
November 26, 2021*; 4:00 p.m., WCCN		at Saint Mary's; Saint Mary's Thanksgiving Classic	W 72–68	2–2	UCU Pavilion (304); Moraga, CA
November 27, 2021*; 2:00 p.m.		vs. California Baptist; Saint Mary's Thanksgiving Classic	L 77–91	2–3	UCU Pavilion (138); Moraga, CA
December 1, 2021*; 6:30 p.m., ESPN+		Southeastern Louisiana	W 55–46	3–3	Schollmaier Arena (1,291); Fort Worth, TX
December 5, 2021*; 1:00 p.m., ESPN+		Florida; Big 12/SEC Women's Challenge	L 54–63	3–4	Schollmaier Arena (1,468); Fort Worth, TX
December 12, 2021*; 1:00 p.m., ESPN+		No. 18 Texas A&M	W 87–75	4–4	Schollmaier Arena (2,371); Fort Worth, TX
December 19, 2021*; 1:00 p.m., ESPN+		Incarnate Word	Canceled		Schollmaier Arena; Fort Worth, TX
December 21, 2021*; 1:00 p.m., ESPN+		UC Riverside	Canceled		Schollmaier Arena; Fort Worth, TX
December 29, 2021*; 6:30 p.m., ESPN+		Davidson	Canceled		Schollmaier Arena; Fort Worth, TX
January 2, 2022*; 1:00 p.m., ESPN+		SMU	L 53–79	4–5	Schollmaier Arena (1,461); Fort Worth, TX
Big 12 Regular season
January 8, 2022; 1:00 p.m., ESPN+		at No. 12 Iowa State	L 47–78	4–6 (0–1)	Hilton Coliseum (9,017); Ames, IA
January 10, 2022; 6:30 p.m., ESPN+		Kansas	L 72–78	4–7 (0–2)	Schollmaier Arena (1,370); Fort Worth, TX
January 12, 2022; 6:30 p.m., ESPN+		Oklahoma State	W 64–63	5–7 (1–2)	Schollmaier Arena (1,398); Fort Worth, TX
January 15, 2022; 1:30 p.m., BSO		at No. 23 Oklahoma	L 71–100	5–8 (1–3)	Lloyd Noble Center (2,460); Norman, OK
January 19, 2022; 6:30 p.m., ESPN+		Texas Tech	W 51–50	6–8 (2–3)	Schollmaier Arena (1,944); Fort Worth, TX
January 22, 2022; 1:00 p.m., ESPN+		No. 15 Texas	L 47–68	6–9 (2–4)	Schollmaier Arena (2,228); Fort Worth, TX
January 25, 2022; 6:00 p.m., ESPN+		at West Virginia	L 54–66	6–10 (2–5)	WVU Coliseum (1,126); Morgantown, WV
January 29, 2022; 6:30 p.m., ESPN+		at No. 25 Kansas State	L 54–63	6–11 (2–6)	Bramlage Coliseum (5,157); Manhattan, KS
February 2, 2022; 4:30 p.m., ESPN+		West Virginia	L 62–70	6–12 (2–7)	Schollmaier Arena (1,265); Fort Worth, TX
February 6, 2022; 2:00 p.m., ESPN+		at Kansas	L 60–75	6–13 (2–8)	Allen Fieldhouse (1,615); Lawrence, KS
February 9, 2022; 6:30 p.m., ESPN+		at Oklahoma State	L 47–76	6–14 (2–9)	Gallagher-Iba Arena (1,759); Stillwater, OK
February 12, 2022; 1:00 p.m., ESPN+		No. 9 Iowa State	L 70–93	6–15 (2–10)	Schollmaier Arena (1,811); Fort Worth, TX
February 16, 2022; 7:00 p.m., ESPN+		at No. 7 Baylor	L 55–80	6–16 (2–11)	Ferrell Center (4,660); Waco, TX
February 19, 2022; 1:00 p.m., ESPN+		No. 7 Baylor	L 59–78	6–17 (2–12)	Schollmaier Arena (2,330); Fort Worth, TX
February 23, 2022; 6:30 p.m., ESPN+		No. 20 Oklahoma	L 57–92	6–18 (2–13)	Schollmaier Arena (1,466); Fort Worth, TX
February 26, 2022; 7:00 p.m., LHN		at No. 11 Texas	L 42–77	6–19 (2–14)	Frank Erwin Center (4,157); Austin, TX
March 2, 2022; 7:00 p.m., ESPN+		at Texas Tech	L 79–83	6–20 (2–15)	United Supermarkets Arena (4,032); Lubbock, TX
March 5, 2022; 1:00 p.m., ESPN+		Kansas State	L 50–61	6–21 (2–16)	Schollmaier Arena (1,595); Fort Worth, TX
Big 12 Women's Tournament
March 10, 2022; 8:00 p.m., ESPN+	(10)	vs. (7) West Virginia; First Round	L 48–68	6–22	Municipal Auditorium (3,155); Kansas City, MO
*Non-conference game. ^{#}Rankings from AP Poll. (#) Tournament seedings in parentheses. All times are in Central Time.

== Rankings ==
Ranking movements Legend: — = Not ranked
	Week																			
Poll	Pre	1	2	3	4	5	6	7	8	9	10	11	12	13	14	15	16	17	18	Final
AP	—	—	—	—	—	—	—	—	—	—	—	—	—	—	—	—	—	—	—	—
Coaches	—	—	—	—	—	—	—	—	—	—	—	—	—	—	—	—	—	—	—	—

The Coaches Poll did not release a Week 2 poll and the AP Poll did not release a poll after the NCAA Tournament.
