= 2021–22 Oklahoma State Cowgirls basketball team =

Women's college basketball season

2021–22 Oklahoma State Cowgirls basketball
- Conference: Big 12 Conference
- Record: 9–20 (3–15 Big 12)
- Head coach: Jim Littell (11th season)
- Assistant coaches: Bill Annan; Jessica Grayson; Tealor Karr
- Home arena: Gallagher-Iba Arena

2021–22 Big 12 Conference women's basketball standings
	Conf.				Overall
Team	W		L	PCT	W		L	PCT
No. 7 Baylor	15	–	3	.833	28	–	7	.800
No. 10 Iowa State	14	–	4	.778	28	–	7	.800
No. 6 Texas †	13	–	5	.722	29	–	7	.806
No. 22 Oklahoma	12	–	6	.667	25	–	9	.735
Kansas	11	–	7	.611	21	–	10	.677
Kansas State	9	–	9	.500	20	–	13	.606
West Virginia	7	–	11	.389	15	–	15	.500
Texas Tech	4	–	14	.222	11	–	19	.367
Oklahoma State	3	–	15	.167	9	–	20	.310
TCU	2	–	16	.111	6	–	22	.214
† 2022 Big 12 Tournament winner Rankings from AP poll

The 2021–22 Oklahoma State Cowgirls basketball team represented Oklahoma State University in the 2020–21 NCAA Division I women's basketball season. The Cowgirls, led by eleventh year head coach Jim Littell, played their home games at Gallagher-Iba Arena and were members of the Big 12 Conference.

They finished the season 9–20 overall, and 3–15 in Big 12 play to finish in ninth place. As the ninth seed in the Big 12 Tournament they defeated Texas Tech in the First Round before losing to first seed Baylor in the Quarterfinals. They were not invited to the NCAA tournament or the WNIT.

== Previous season ==
The Cowgirls finished the season 19–9, 13–5 in Big 12 play to finish in a tie for second place. As the third seed in the Big 12 Tournament they defeated Oklahoma in the Quarterfinals before losing to West Virginia in the Semifinals. They received an at-large bid to the NCAA women's basketball tournament. As the eight seed in the Alamo Regional, the defeated Wake Forest in the First Round before losing to eventual champions Stanford in the Second Round.

== Roster ==
2021–22 Oklahoma State Cowgirls women's basketball team
Players
Coaches

Pos.	#	Name	Height	Year	Previous school	Hometown
F	0	Tracey Bershers	6 ft 2 in (1.88 m)	Fr	Northside	Fort Smith, AR
C	1	Kassidy De Lapp	6 ft 3 in (1.91 m)	Sr	Oak Ridge	El Dorado Hills, CA
G	2	Neferatali Notoa	5 ft 11 in (1.8 m)	So	Brisbane State	Brisbane, Australia
G	3	Micah Dennis	5 ft 9 in (1.75 m)	Jr	Cairine Wilson	Toronto, Canada
G	5	Chloe Mayer	5 ft 5 in (1.65 m)	Jr	Pleasant Valley; Butte College	Chico, CA
G	11	N'Yah Boyd	5 ft 6 in (1.68 m)	Jr	Horn; North Texas	Mesquite, TX
F	14	Taylen Collins	6 ft 1 in (1.85 m)	So	Muldrow	Muldrow, OK
G	15	Lexy Keys	5 ft 7 in (1.7 m)	So	Tahlequah-Sequoyah	Tahlequah, OK
G	20	Macie James	5 ft 11 in (1.8 m)	Fr	San Joaquin	Fresno, CA
F	22	Ruthie Udoumoh	6 ft 0 in (1.83 m)	So	Victory Christian	Broken Arrow, OK
G	23	Lauren Fields	5 ft 9 in (1.75 m)	RS Jr	Shawnee	Shawnee, OK
F	24	Kennedi Jackson	6 ft 3 in (1.91 m)	RS So	Ursuline	New Orleans, LA
F	25	Abbie Winchester	6 ft 1 in (1.85 m)	GS	Heritage Hall	Oklahoma City, OK
G	30	Sara Rodrigues	6 ft 3 in (1.91 m)	Jr	Colégio Integrado de Guarulhos	São Paulo, Brazil
F	32	Tori Garza	6 ft 1 in (1.85 m)	Fr	New Caney	New Caney, TX
F	35	Brittany Reeves	6 ft 5 in (1.96 m)	Sr	Howard; Independence CC	Macon, GA

Head coach

- Jim Littell (Southwestern (KS))

Assistant coach(es)

- Bill Annan (Kansas State)
- Jessica Grayson (Austin Peay)
- Taelor Karr (Kansas State)

Legend

- (C) Team captain
- (S) Suspended
- (I) Ineligible
- (W) Walk-on
- Injured
- Current redshirt

Roster
Last update: April 21, 2022

== Schedule and results ==
Date time, TV	Rank^{#}	Opponent^{#}	Result	Record	Site (attendance) city, state
Exhibition
November 4, 2021*; 6:30 p.m.		Southern Nazarene	W 64–40	–	Gallagher-Iba Arena (1,297); Stillwater, OK
Non-Conference Regular season
November 10, 2021*; 6:30 p.m., ESPN+		Colorado	L 45–55	0–1	Gallagher-Iba Arena (1,575); Stillwater, OK
November 14, 2021*; Noon, ESPN+		at SMU	W 67–50	1–1	Moody Coliseum (463); Dallas, TX
November 17, 2021*; 6:30 p.m.		Missouri State	W 44–40	2–1	Gallagher-Iba Arena (1,577); Stillwater, OK
November 20, 2021*; 2:00 p.m., ESPN+		at Rice	W 68–48	3–1	Tudor Fieldhouse (622); Houston, TX
November 26, 2021*; 3:00 p.m.		vs. Green Bay; South Point Shootout	L 54–57	3–2	South Point Arena (5,500); Enterprise, NV
November 27, 2021*; 5:30 p.m.		vs. No. 11 Tennessee; South Point Shootout	L 55–80	3–3	South Point Arena; Enterprise, NV
December 5, 2021*; 2:00 p.m., SECN+		at Auburn; Big 12/SEC Women's Challenge	L 66–77	3–4	Auburn Arena (1,873); Auburn, AL
December 15, 2021*; 6:30 p.m.		Southern	W 75–33	4–4	Gallagher-Iba Arena (1,848); Stillwater, OK
December 17, 2021*; 6:30 p.m.		UT Arlington	W 61–46	5–4	Gallagher-Iba Arena (2,073); Stillwater, OK
December 21, 2021*; 1:00 p.m.		North Texas	Canceled		Gallagher-Iba Arena; Stillwater, OK
December 28, 2021*; 6:30 p.m., ESPN+		Tulsa	Canceled		Gallagher-Iba Arena; Stillwater, OK
Big 12 Regular season
January 2, 2022; 2:00 p.m., ESPN+		No. 12 Texas	L 51–62	5–5 (0–1)	Gallagher-Iba Arena (2,041); Stillwater, OK
January 5, 2022; 6:30 p.m., ESPN+		Kansas State	L 49–60	5–6 (0–2)	Gallagher-Iba Arena (1,823); Stillwater, OK
January 8, 2022; 7:30 p.m., ESPN+		at Texas Tech	W 57–55	6–6 (1–2)	United Supermarkets Arena (4,910); Lubbock, TX
January 12, 2022; 6:30 p.m., ESPN+		at TCU	L 63–64	6–7 (1–3)	Schollmaier Arena (1,398); Fort Worth, TX
January 15, 2022; 1:00 p.m., ESPN+		No. 9 Iowa State	L 60–74	6–8 (1–4)	Gallagher-Iba Arena (1,937); Stillwater, OK
January 19, 2022; 7:00 p.m., ESPN+		at No. 15т Baylor	L 49–67	6–9 (1–5)	Ferrell Center (4,078); Waco, TX
January 22, 2022; 1:00 p.m., ESPN+		West Virginia	L 58–84	6–10 (1–6)	Gallagher-Iba Arena (2,046); Stillwater, OK
January 26, 2022; 6:00 p.m., BSOK		at No. 18 Oklahoma; Bedlam	L 58–84	6–11 (1–7)	Lloyd Noble Center (2,668); Norman, OK
January 29, 2022; 1:00 p.m., ESPN+		Kansas	L 54–68	6–12 (1–8)	Gallagher-Iba Arena (2,040); Stillwater, OK
February 2, 2022; 7:00 p.m., ESPN+		at Kansas	L 56–65	6–13 (1–9)	Allen Fieldhouse (1,031); Lawrence, KS
February 5, 2022; 6:00 p.m., ESPN+		at No. 11 Iowa State	L 58–76	6–14 (1–10)	Hilton Coliseum (10,443); Ames, IA
February 9, 2022; 6:30 p.m., ESPN+		TCU	W 76–47	7–14 (2–10)	Gallagher-Iba Arena (1,759); Stillwater, OK
February 12, 2022; 7:00 p.m., ESPN+		Texas Tech	W 62–58	8–14 (3–10)	Gallagher-Iba Arena (3,002); Stillwater, OK
February 20, 2022; 3:00 p.m., ESPNU		at Kansas State	L 38–56	8–15 (3–11)	Bramlage Coliseum (5,868); Manhattan, KS
February 23, 2022; 6:30 p.m., ESPN+		No. 5 Baylor	L 58–65	8–16 (3–12)	Gallagher-Iba Arena (423); Stillwater, OK
February 27, 2022; Noon, ESPNU		at West Virginia	L 56–60	8–17 (3–13)	WVU Coliseum (2,220); Morgantown, WV
March 2, 2022; 6:30 p.m., ESPN+		Oklahoma; Bedlam	L 76–79	8–18 (3–14)	Gallagher-Iba Arena (2,450); Stillwater, OK
March 5, 2022; 1:00 p.m., LHN		at No. 9 Texas	L 50–65	8–19 (3–15)	Gallagher-Iba Arena (12,506); Stillwater, OK
Big 12 Women's Tournament
March 10, 2022; 5:30 p.m., ESPN+	(9)	vs. (8) Texas Tech; First Round	W 73–58	9–19	Municipal Auditorium (3,155); Kansas City, MO
March 11, 2022; 1:30 p.m., ESPN	(9)	vs. (1) No. 4 Baylor; Quarterfinals	L 36–76	9–20	Municipal Auditorium (3,642); Kansas City, MO
*Non-conference game. ^{#}Rankings from AP Poll. (#) Tournament seedings in parentheses. All times are in Central Time.

== Rankings ==
Ranking movements Legend: — = Not ranked
	Week																			
Poll	Pre	1	2	3	4	5	6	7	8	9	10	11	12	13	14	15	16	17	18	Final
AP	—	—	—	—	—	—	—	—	—	—	—	—	—	—	—	—	—	—	—	—
Coaches	—	—	—	—	—	—	—	—	—	—	—	—	—	—	—	—	—	—	—	—

The Coaches Poll did not release a Week 2 poll and the AP Poll did not release a poll after the NCAA Tournament.
