= 2022 Big 12 Conference women's basketball tournament =

- Classification: Division I
- Season: 2021–22
- Teams: 10
- Site: Municipal Auditorium; Kansas City, Missouri
- Champions: Texas (2nd title)
- Winning coach: Vic Schaefer (1st title)
- MVP: Rori Harmon (Texas)
- Attendance: 20,415
- Television: ESPN+, ESPNU, ESPN2

2021–22 Big 12 Conference women's basketball standings
	Conf.				Overall
Team	W		L	PCT	W		L	PCT
No. 7 Baylor	15	–	3	.833	28	–	7	.800
No. 10 Iowa State	14	–	4	.778	28	–	7	.800
No. 6 Texas †	13	–	5	.722	29	–	7	.806
No. 22 Oklahoma	12	–	6	.667	25	–	9	.735
Kansas	11	–	7	.611	21	–	10	.677
Kansas State	9	–	9	.500	20	–	13	.606
West Virginia	7	–	11	.389	15	–	15	.500
Texas Tech	4	–	14	.222	11	–	19	.367
Oklahoma State	3	–	15	.167	9	–	20	.310
TCU	2	–	16	.111	6	–	22	.214
† 2022 Big 12 Tournament winner Rankings from AP poll

The 2022 Phillips 66 Big 12 Conference women's basketball tournament is the postseason tournament for the Big 12 Conference that will be held from March 10 to 13, 2021, in Kansas City, Missouri, at the Municipal Auditorium.

== Seeds ==
2021 Big 12 Conference women's basketball tournament seeds and results
Seed	School	Conf.	Over.
1	Baylor ‡#	15–3	25–5
2	Iowa State #	14–4	25–5
3	Texas #	13–5	23–6
4	Oklahoma #	12–6	23–7
5	Kansas #	11–7	20–8
6	Kansas State #	9–9	19–11
7	West Virginia	7–11	14–14
8	Texas Tech	4–14	11–18
9	Oklahoma State	3–15	8–19
10	TCU	2–16	6–21
‡ – Big 12 Conference regular season champions, and tournament No. 1 seed. # - Received a single-bye in the conference tournament. Overall records do not include games played in the Big 12 Conference tournament.

== Schedule ==
Session	Game	Time	Matchup	Television	Attendance
First round – Thursday, March 10
1	1	5:30 pm	No. 9 Oklahoma State 73 vs. No. 8 Texas Tech 58	ESPN+	3,155
1	2	8:00 pm	No. 10 TCU 48 vs. No. 7 West Virginia 68	ESPN+	3,155
Quarterfinals – Friday, March 11
2	3	11:00 am	No. 4 Oklahoma 80 vs. No. 5 Kansas 68	ESPNU/ESPN+	3,642
2	4	1:30 pm	No. 9 Oklahoma State 36 vs. No. 1 Baylor 76	ESPNU/ESPN+	3,642
3	5	5:00 pm	No. 7 West Virginia 60 vs. No. 2 Iowa State 66	ESPN+	5,163
3	6	7:30 pm	No. 6 Kansas State 65 vs. No. 3 Texas 72	ESPN+	5,163
Semifinals – Saturday, March 12
4	7	Noon	No. 4 Oklahoma 76 vs. No. 1 Baylor 91	ESPN+	5,013
4	8	3:00 pm	No. 2 Iowa State 73 vs. No. 3 Texas 82*	ESPN+	5,013
Championship Game – Sunday, March 13
5	9	Noon	No. 1 Baylor 58 vs. No. 3 Texas 67	ESPN2	3,442
Game Times in CT. Rankings denote tournament seed.

== Bracket ==
First round Thursday, March 10
8	Texas Tech	58
9	Oklahoma State	73
7	West Virginia	68
10	TCU	48

Quarterfinals; Friday, March 11
1	Baylor	76
9	Oklahoma State	36
4	Oklahoma	80
5	Kansas	68
2	Iowa State	66
7	West Virginia	60
3	Texas	72
6	Kansas State	65

Semifinals; Saturday, March 12
1	Baylor	91
4	Oklahoma	76
2	Iowa State	73
3	Texas	82*

Championship game Sunday, March 13
1	Baylor	58
3	Texas	67

*denotes overtime
