= 2021–22 Oklahoma Sooners women's basketball team =

Women's college basketball season

2021–22 Oklahoma Sooners women's basketball

NCAA tournament, second round
- Conference: Big 12

Ranking
- Coaches: No. 19
- AP: No. 22
- Record: 25–9 (12–6 Big 12)
- Head coach: Jennie Baranczyk (1st season)
- Assistant coaches: Amy Wright; Michael Neal; Chantel Osahor
- Home arena: Lloyd Noble Center

2021–22 Big 12 Conference women's basketball standings
	Conf.				Overall
Team	W		L	PCT	W		L	PCT
No. 7 Baylor	15	–	3	.833	28	–	7	.800
No. 10 Iowa State	14	–	4	.778	28	–	7	.800
No. 6 Texas †	13	–	5	.722	29	–	7	.806
No. 22 Oklahoma	12	–	6	.667	25	–	9	.735
Kansas	11	–	7	.611	21	–	10	.677
Kansas State	9	–	9	.500	20	–	13	.606
West Virginia	7	–	11	.389	15	–	15	.500
Texas Tech	4	–	14	.222	11	–	19	.367
Oklahoma State	3	–	15	.167	9	–	20	.310
TCU	2	–	16	.111	6	–	22	.214
† 2022 Big 12 Tournament winner Rankings from AP poll

The 2021–22 Oklahoma Sooners women's basketball team represented the University of Oklahoma in the 2021–22 NCAA Division I women's basketball season. The Sooners were led by first year head coach Jennie Baranczyk who appointed in April 2021. The team played its home games at the Lloyd Noble Center in Norman, Oklahoma was a member of the Big 12 Conference.

== Previous season ==
The Sooners finished the previous season 12–12, 9–9 in Big 12 play, to finish in sixth place. At the Big 12 Tournament Sooners lost against Oklahoma State 80–89 in overtime.

== Offseason ==
=== Departures ===
Departures
Name	Number	Pos.	Height	Year	Hometown	Reason for departure
Mandy Simpson	3	F	6'1"	Graduate Student	Boise, ID	Transferred to Boise State

=== Additions ===
Incoming transfers
Name	Number	Pos.	Height	Year	Hometown	Previous school
Kennady Tucker	4	G	5'10"	Junior	Little Rock, AR	North Carolina

=== Recruits ===
==== 2021 recruiting class ====
College recruiting
Name	Hometown	School	Height	Weight	Commit date
Kelbie Washington; G	Norman, OK	Norman HS	5 ft 3 in (1.60 m)	N/A	Apr 8, 2020
Kelbie Washington; G	Recruit ratings: ESPN: (91)				
Kaley Perkins; G	Houston, TX	Langham Creek HS	6 ft 0 in (1.83 m)	N/A	May 2, 2020
Kaley Perkins; G	Recruit ratings: No ratings found				
Bre'yon White; F	Pearland, TX	Shadow Creek HS	5 ft 11 in (1.80 m)	N/A	May 16, 2020
Bre'yon White; F	Recruit ratings: No ratings found				
Emma Svoboda; C	La Quinta, CA	La Quinta HS	6 ft 3 in (1.91 m)	N/A	Sep 1, 2020
Emma Svoboda; C	Recruit ratings: No ratings found				
Overall recruit ranking:
Note: In many cases, Scout, Rivals, 247Sports, On3, and ESPN may conflict in their listings of height and weight.; In these cases, the average was taken. ESPN grades are on a 100-point scale.; Sources: "2021 Player Commits". ESPN. Archived from the original on February 22, 2022.

==== 2022 recruiting class ====
College recruiting (2022)
Name	Hometown	School	Height	Weight	Commit date
Beatrice Culliton; C	Overland Park, KS	Saint Thomas Aquinas HS	6 ft 3 in (1.91 m)	N/A	Jun 16, 2021
Beatrice Culliton; C	Recruit ratings: ESPN: (91)				
Kiersten Johnson; F	Carrollton, TX	Duncanville HS	6 ft 3 in (1.91 m)	N/A	Nov 1, 2021
Kiersten Johnson; F	Recruit ratings: ESPN: (90)				
Kayla Cooper; G	Plano, TX	Plano East HS	5 ft 8 in (1.73 m)	N/A	Jun 4, 2021
Kayla Cooper; G	Recruit ratings: No ratings found				
Reyna Scott; G	New York, NY	Nazareth Regional HS	5 ft 9 in (1.75 m)	N/A	Nov 5, 2021
Reyna Scott; G	Recruit ratings: No ratings found				
Overall recruit ranking:
Note: In many cases, Scout, Rivals, 247Sports, On3, and ESPN may conflict in their listings of height and weight.; In these cases, the average was taken. ESPN grades are on a 100-point scale.; Sources: "2022 Player Commits". ESPN.; "2022 Team Ranking". Rivals.

== Roster ==
2021–22 Oklahoma Sooners women's basketball team
Players
Coaches

Pos.	#	Name	Height	Year	Previous school	Hometown
G	1	Nevaeh Tot	5 ft 2 in (1.57 m)	So	John Paul II	Columbus, OH
G	4	Kennady Tucker	5 ft 10 in (1.78 m)	Jr	North Little Rock; North Carolina	Little Rock, AR
G	10	Kelbie Washington	5 ft 6 in (1.68 m)	Fr	Norman	Norman, OK
G	12	Gabby Gregory	5 ft 11 in (1.8 m)	Jr	Holland Hall	Tulsa, OK
F	13	Jordan Moser	6 ft 1 in (1.85 m)	Jr	Loyola Academy; Loyola–Chicago	Norman, OK
F	14	Bre'yon White	5 ft 11 in (1.8 m)	Fr	Shadow Creek	Pearland, TX
F	21	Nydia Lampkin	6 ft 3 in (1.91 m)	Sr	American Heritage	Palm Bay, FL
G	22	Ana Llanusa	5 ft 11 in (1.8 m)	RS Sr	Choctaw	Choctaw, OK
G	23	Kaley Perkins	6 ft 0 in (1.83 m)	Fr	Langham Creek	Houston, TX
G	24	Skylar Vann	5 ft 11 in (1.8 m)	So	Deer Creek	Edmond, OK
G/F	25	Madi Williams	5 ft 11 in (1.8 m)	Sr	Trinity Valley School	Fort Worth, TX
G	30	Taylor Robertson	5 ft 11 in (1.8 m)	Sr	McPherson	McPherson, KS
C	33	Emma Svoboda	6 ft 3 in (1.91 m)	Fr	La Quinta	La Quinta, CA
F	34	Liz Scott	6 ft 2 in (1.88 m)	Jr	Klein Oak	Tomball, TX

Head coach

- Jennie Baranczyk (Iowa)

Assistant coach(es)

- Amy Wright (Arkansas)
- Michael Neal (Oklahoma)
- Chantel Osahor (Washington)

Legend

- (C) Team captain
- (S) Suspended
- (I) Ineligible
- (W) Walk-on
- Injured
- Current redshirt

Roster
Last update: January 4, 2022

== Schedule ==
Date time, TV	Rank^{#}	Opponent^{#}	Result	Record	High points	High rebounds	High assists	Site (attendance) city, state
Exhibition
October 31, 2021*; 2:00 pm, SSTV		Rogers State	W 93–23	–	16 – Tied	8 – Svoboda	7 – Tied	Lloyd Noble Center (1,001); Norman, OK
Non-conference regular season (11-1)
November 9, 2021*; 7:00 pm, ESPN+		at South Dakota	W 73–71	1–0	19 – Tied	8 – Robertson	3 – Tied	Sanford Coyote Sports Center (3,106); Vermillion, SD
November 12, 2021*; 10:30 am, BSSW		Arkansas State	W 101–89	2–0	18 – Williams	9 – Svoboda	4 – Tied	Lloyd Noble Center (3,751); Norman, OK
November 16, 2021*; 6:00 pm, BSOK		Central Arkansas	W 78–54	3–0	16 – Llanusa	11 – Vann	4 – Llanusa	Lloyd Noble Center (1,333); Norman, OK
November 20, 2021*; 4:00 pm, FloHoops		vs. No. 9 Oregon; Battle 4 Atlantis quarterfinal	L 93–98	3–1	29 – Robertson	9 – Vann	8 – Robertson	Imperial Arena (875); Nassau, Bahamas
November 21, 2021*; 7:30 pm, FloHoops		vs. Buffalo; Battle 4 Atlantis Consolation	W 93–72	4–1	27 – Robertson	12 – Williams	7 – Washington	Imperial Arena (591); Nassau, Bahamas
November 22, 2021*; 4:00 pm		vs. Minnesota; Battle 4 Atlantis 5th place	W 88–69	5–1	19 – Robertson	11 – Williams	8 – Washington	Imperial Arena (267); Nassau, Bahamas
November 30, 2021*; 7:00 pm, ESPN+		at SMU	W 84–72	6–1	25 – Llanusa	8 – Llanusa	10 – Washington	Moody Coliseum (477); Dallas, TX
December 4, 2021*; 2:00 pm, BSOK		Mississippi State; Big 12/SEC Challenge	W 94–63	7–1	22 – Robertson	11 – Williams	5 – Tot	Lloyd Noble Center (1,400); Norman, OK
December 7, 2021*; 5:00 pm, BSOK		Eastern Michigan	W 94–58	8–1	21 – Robertson	10 – Williams	3 – Tied	Lloyd Noble Center (1,267); Norman, OK
December 10, 2021*; 6:00 pm, SSTV		No. 16 BYU	W 99–91 ^{OT}	9–1	25 – Williams	14 – Williams	4 – Tied	Lloyd Noble Center (1,527); Norman, OK
December 21, 2021*; 6:00 pm, BSOK		Utah	W 83–76	10–1	19 – Robertson	7 – Scott	4 – Washington	Lloyd Noble Center (1,705); Norman, OK
December 29, 2021*; 6:00 pm, BSOK		Wichita State	W 89–67	11–1	21 – Vann	12 – Scott	14 – Washington	Lloyd Noble Center (1,809); Norman, OK
Big 12 regular season (12-6)
January 2, 2022; 2:00 pm, ESPN+		at Texas Tech	W 97–91	12–1 (1–0)	24 – Williams	7 – Robertson	7 – Washington	United Supermarkets Arena (4,792); Lubbock, TX
January 5, 2022; 6:00 pm, BSOK	No. 23	No. 12 Iowa State	L 71–81	12–2 (1–1)	26 – Williams	9 – Tied	5 – Tucker	Lloyd Noble Center (1,582); Norman, OK
January 8, 2022; 4:00 pm	No. 23	at Kansas	W 82–68	13–2 (2–1)	24 – Robertson	11 – Williams	9 – Tot	Allen Fieldhouse (1,655); Lawrence, KS
January 12, 2022; 6:00 pm, BSOK	No. 23	No. 14 Baylor	W 83–77	14–2 (3–1)	22 – Vann	7 – Vann	7 – Williams	Lloyd Noble Center (2,002); Norman, OK
January 15, 2022; 1:30 pm, BSOK	No. 23	TCU	W 100–71	15–2 (4–1)	21 – Williams	11 – Williams	7 – Robertson	Lloyd Noble Center (2,460); Norman, OK
January 19, 2022; 6:00 pm, ESPN+	No. 14	at West Virginia	W 88–76	16–2 (5–1)	23 – Williams	9 – Williams	8 – Tot	WVU Coliseum (1,084); Morgantown, WV
January 23, 2022; 1:00 pm, ESPNU	No. 14	at Kansas State	L 65–94	16–3 (5–2)	19 – Robertson	7 – Svoboda	4 – Tied	Bramlage Coliseum (4,347); Manhattan, KS
January 26, 2022; 6:00 pm, BSOK	No. 18	Oklahoma State	W 84–58	17–3 (6–2)	22 – Scott	7 – Williams	6 – Washington	Lloyd Noble Center (2,668); Norman, OK
January 29, 2022; 2:00 pm, BSOK	No. 18	No. 9 Texas	W 65–63	18–3 (7–2)	23 – Williams	10 – Robertson	4 – Tot	Lloyd Noble Center (3,315); Norman, OK
February 2, 2022; 7:00 pm, ESPN+	No. 18	at No. 9 Baylor	W 78–77	19–3 (8–2)	20 – Williams	8 – Williams	5 – Williams	Ferrell Center (4,274); Waco, TX
February 5, 2022; 3:00 pm, BSOK	No. 18	West Virginia	W 101–99 ^{2OT}	20–3 (9–2)	26 – Robertson	9 – Williams	7 – Washington	Lloyd Noble Center (2,404); Norman, OK
February 12, 2022; 7:00 pm, LHN	No. 12	at No. 16 Texas	L 63–78	20–4 (9–3)	16 – Williams	5 – Williams	2 – Tied	Frank Erwin Center (3,793); Austin, TX
February 16, 2022; 6:00 pm, SSTV	No. 15	Texas Tech	L 87–97	20–5 (9–4)	17 – Vann	6 – Tied	4 – Tot	Lloyd Noble Center (1,769); Norman, OK
February 19, 2022; 6:00 pm, ESPN+	No. 15	at No. 6 Iowa State	L 67–89	20–6 (9–5)	20 – Williams	7 – Robertson	4 – Tot	Hilton Coliseum (11,321); Ames, IA
February 23, 2022; 6:30 pm, ESPN+	No. 20	at TCU	W 92–57	21–6 (10–5)	17 – Vann	6 – Scott	6 – Washington	Schollmaier Arena (1,466); Fort Worth, TX
February 26, 2022; 4:00 pm, BSOK	No. 20	Kansas State	W 72–69	22–6 (11–5)	18 – Williams	10 – Williams	3 – Scott	Lloyd Noble Center; Norman, OK
March 2, 2022; 6:30 pm, ESPN+	No. 19	at Oklahoma State	W 79–76	23–6 (12–5)	19 – Tied	11 – Robertson	4 – Tied	Gallagher-Iba Arena (2,450); Stillwater, OK
March 5, 2022; 2:00 pm, BSOK	No. 19	Kansas	L 67–73	23–7 (12–6)	17 – Vann	9 – Williams	4 – Tied	Lloyd Noble Center (3,104); Norman, OK
Big 12 Women's Tournament (1-1)
March 11, 2022; 11:00 a.m., ESPN+/ESPNU	(4) No. 21	vs. (5) Kansas; Quarterfinals	W 80–68	24–7	19 – Tied	11 – Williams	7 – Williams	Municipal Auditorium; Kansas City, MO
March 12, 2022; Noon, ESPN+	(4) No. 21	vs. (1) No. 4 Baylor; Semifinals	L 76–91	24–8	33 – Williams	8 – Williams	4 – Tot	Municipal Auditorium; Kansas City, MO
NCAA tournament (1-1)
March 19, 2022*; 9:00 p.m., ESPNU	(4 B) No. 22	(13 B) IUPUI; First Round	W 78–72	25–8	22 – Robertson	8 – Tot	4 – Robertson	Lloyd Noble Center (3,952); Norman, OK
March 21, 2022*; 5:00 p.m., ESPN2	(4 B) No. 22	(5 B) No. 21 Notre Dame; Second Round	L 64–108	25–9	19 – Robertson	9 – Vann	4 – Tucker	Lloyd Noble Center (3,258); Norman, OK
*Non-conference game. ^{#}Rankings from AP Poll. (#) Tournament seedings in parentheses. All times are in Central Time.

== Rankings ==
Ranking Movement Legend: ██ Increase in ranking. ██ Decrease in ranking. ██ Not ranked previous week. NR = Not ranked. RV = Received votes.
Poll	Pre	Wk 2	Wk 3	Wk 4	Wk 5	Wk 6	Wk 7	Wk 8	Wk 9	Wk 10	Wk 11	Wk 12	Wk 13	Wk 14	Wk 15	Wk 16	Wk 17	Wk 18	Final
AP	RV	RV	RV	RV	RV	RV	RV	RV	23	23	14	18	18	12	15	20	19	21	22
Coaches	RV	-	RV	RV	RV	RV	RV	RV	25	25	19	21	18	15	15	19	19	19	

Coaches' Poll did not release a second poll at the same time as the AP.

== See also ==
- 2021–22 Oklahoma Sooners men's basketball team
