= 2021–22 Texas Tech Lady Raiders basketball team =

Women's college basketball season

2021–22 Texas Tech Lady Raiders basketball
- Conference: Big 12 Conference
- Record: 11–19 (4–14 Big 12)
- Head coach: Krista Gerlich (2nd season)
- Assistant coaches: JC Carter; Ashley Crawford; Eric Ely
- Home arena: United Supermarkets Arena

2021–22 Big 12 Conference women's basketball standings
| | Conf. | | | | Overall |
| Team | W | | L | PCT | W | | L | PCT |
|---|---|---|---|---|---|---|---|---|
| No. 7 Baylor | 15 | – | 3 | .833 | 28 | – | 7 | .800 |
| No. 10 Iowa State | 14 | – | 4 | .778 | 28 | – | 7 | .800 |
| No. 6 Texas † | 13 | – | 5 | .722 | 29 | – | 7 | .806 |
| No. 22 Oklahoma | 12 | – | 6 | .667 | 25 | – | 9 | .735 |
| Kansas | 11 | – | 7 | .611 | 21 | – | 10 | .677 |
| Kansas State | 9 | – | 9 | .500 | 20 | – | 13 | .606 |
| West Virginia | 7 | – | 11 | .389 | 15 | – | 15 | .500 |
| Texas Tech | 4 | – | 14 | .222 | 11 | – | 19 | .367 |
| Oklahoma State | 3 | – | 15 | .167 | 9 | – | 20 | .310 |
| TCU | 2 | – | 16 | .111 | 6 | – | 22 | .214 |
† 2022 Big 12 Tournament winner Rankings from AP poll

The 2021–22 Texas Tech Lady Raiders basketball team represented Texas Tech University in the 2021–22 NCAA Division I women's basketball season. The Lady Raiders were led by second-year head coach Krista Gerlich. They played their homes games at United Supermarkets Arena and competed as members of the Big 12 Conference.

== Previous season ==
The Lady Raiders finished the season 10-15, 5-13 in Big 12 play to finish in seventh place. They lost to Kansas State in the Big 12 Tournament. They were not invited to the NCAA tournament or the WNIT.

== Roster ==
2021–22 Texas Tech Lady Raiders women's basketball team
Players
Coaches

| Pos. | # | Name | Height | Year | Previous school | Hometown |
|---|---|---|---|---|---|---|
| G | 0 | Bre'Amber Scott | 5 ft 11 in (1.8 m) | Jr | Little Rock Central; Mississippi State; Little Rock | Little Rock, AR |
| C | 1 | Ella Tofaeono | 6 ft 3 in (1.91 m) | Jr | Midland; Texas A&M | Sydney, Australia |
| G | 4 | Lexy Hightower | 5 ft 8 in (1.73 m) | Sr | Amarillo; West Texas A&M | Amarillo, TX |
| G | 5 | Rhyle McKinney | 5 ft 9 in (1.75 m) | Fr | Argyle; SMU | Argyle, TX |
| F | 10 | Bryn Gerlich | 6 ft 0 in (1.83 m) | Jr | Colleyville Heritage; Oklahoma State | Colleyville, TX |
| G | 11 | Saga Ukkonen | 5 ft 9 in (1.75 m) | Fr | Mäkelänrinne | Helsinki, Finland |
| G | 12 | Vivian Gray | 6 ft 1 in (1.85 m) | Sr | Argyle; Fort Lewis; Oklahoma State | Argyle, TX |
| F | 14 | Lana Wenger | 6 ft 4 in (1.93 m) | Fr | Futures Academy | Hersberg, Switzerland |
| C | 23 | Khadija Faye | 6 ft 4 in (1.93 m) | Fr | Father Lopez Catholic | Dakar, Senegal |
| F | 24 | Taylah Thomas | 6 ft 1 in (1.85 m) | Sr | Mansfield Timberview; Arkansas | Arlington, TX |
| G | 32 | Tatum Veitenheimer | 5 ft 8 in (1.73 m) | Jr | Windthorst; Oklahoma | Windthorst, TX |
| F | 33 | Chantae Embry | 6 ft 1 in (1.85 m) | Fr | Norman | Norman, OK |

Head coach

- Krista Gerlich (Texas Tech)

Assistant coach(es)

- JC Carter (Southwest Baptist)
- Ashley Crawford (Lamar)
- Eric Ely (Northwest Nazarene)

Legend

- (C) Team captain
- (S) Suspended
- (I) Ineligible
- (W) Walk-on
- Injured
- Current redshirt

Roster

== Schedule ==
| Date time, TV | Rank^{#} | Opponent^{#} | Result | Record | Site (attendance) city, state |
Regular season
| November 11, 2021*; 7:00 p.m., ESPN+ | | Southeastern Louisiana | W 67–45 | 1–0 | United Supermarkets Arena (3,511); Lubbock, TX |
| November 16, 2021*; 7:00 p.m., ESPN+ | | Weber State | W 62–44 | 2–0 | United Supermarkets Arena (3,372); Lubbock, TX |
| November 19, 2021*; 7:00 p.m., ESPN+ | | Lamar | W 72–68 | 3–0 | United Supermarkets Arena (4,339); Lubbock, TX |
| November 22, 2021*; 7:00 p.m., ESPN+ | | Texas State | W 83–57 | 4–0 | United Supermarkets Arena (4,066); Lubbock, TX |
| November 26, 2021*; 4:00 p.m. | | vs. Ball State; Van Chancellor Classic | W 71–67 | 5–0 | Merrell Center (N/A); Katy, TX |
| November 27, 2021*; 1:30 p.m. | | vs. Old Dominion; Van Chancellor Classic | L 45–59 | 5–1 | Merrell Center (N/A); Katy, TX |
| November 28, 2021*; 4:00 p.m. | | vs. New Mexico; Van Chancellor Classic | W 82–75 | 6–1 | Merrell Center (N/A); Katy, TX |
| December 2, 2021*; 11:00 a.m., ESPNU | | No. 20 Georgia; Big 12/SEC Challenge | L 56–66 | 6–2 | United Supermarkets Arena (8,163); Lubbock, TX |
| December 12, 2021*; 2:00 p.m., ESPN+ | | vs. UNLV | W 68–61 | 7–2 | First United Bank Center (1,883); Canyon, TX |
| December 20, 2021*; 12:15 p.m. | | vs. Ole Miss; West Palm Invitational | L 50–65 | 7–3 | Palm Beach State College; Lake Worth, FL |
| December 21, 2021*; 2:30 p.m. | | vs. No. 21 LSU; West Palm Invitational | L 60–74 | 7–4 | Palm Beach State College (915); Lake Worth, FL |
| December 29, 2021*; 7:00 p.m. | | Incarnate Word | Postponed | | United Supermarkets Arena; Lubbock, TX |
| January 2, 2022; 2:00 p.m. | | Oklahoma | L 91–97 | 7–5 (0–1) | United Supermarkets Arena (4,792); Lubbock, TX |
| January 5, 2022; 7:00 p.m. | | at No. 9 Texas | W 74–61 | 8–5 (1–1) | Frank Erwin Center (2,723); Austin, TX |
| January 8, 2022; 7:30 p.m. | | Oklahoma State | L 55-57 | 8–6 (1–2) | United Supermarkets Arena (4,910); Lubbock, TX |
| January 12, 2022; 6:00 p.m. | | at West Virginia | L 53-64 | 8–7 (1–3) | WVU Coliseum (1,075); Morgantown, WV |
| January 15, 2022; 2:00 p.m., ESPN+ | | No. 25 Kansas State | W 64–45 | 9–7 (2–3) | United Supermarkets Arena (5,015); Lubbock, TX |
| January 19, 2022; 6:30 p.m., ESPN+ | | at TCU | L 50-51 | 9–8 (2–4) | Schollmaier Arena (1,944); Fort Worth, TX |
| January 22, 2022; 4:00 p.m., ESPN+ | | at Kansas | L 57–71 | 9–9 (2–5) | Allen Fieldhouse (1,176); Lawrence, KS |
| January 26, 2022; 7:00 p.m., ESPN+ | | No. 11 Baylor | L 80–88 | 9–10 (2–6) | United Supermarkets Arena (4,504); Lubbock, TX |
| January 29, 2022; 12:30 p.m., ESPN+ | | No. 13 Iowa State | L 65–86 | 9–11 (2–7) | United Supermarkets Arena (4,057); Lubbock, TX |
| February 5, 2022; 6:30 p.m. | | at No. 25 Kansas State | L 75–82 | 9–12 (2–8) | Bramlage Coliseum (5,588); Manhattan, KS |
| February 9, 2022; 7:00 p.m., ESPN+ | | No. 16 Texas | L 56–61 | 9–13 (2–9) | United Supermarkets Arena (4,821); Lubbock, TX |
| February 12, 2022; 7:00 p.m. | | at Oklahoma State | L 58–62 | 9–14 (2–10) | Gallagher-Iba Arena (3,002); Stillwater, OK |
| February 16, 2022; 6:00 p.m. | | at No. 15 Oklahoma | W 97-87 | 10–14 (3–10) | Lloyd Noble Center (1,769); Norman, OK |
| February 19, 2022; 2:00 p.m., ESPN+ | | Kansas | L 68–71 | 10–15 (3–11) | United Supermarkets Arena (5,291); Lubbock, TX |
| February 23, 2022; 7:00 p.m., ESPN+ | | West Virginia | L 62–73 | 10–16 (3–12) | United Supermarkets Arena (3,410); Lubbock, TX |
| February 26, 2022; 1:00 p.m. | | at No. 9 Iowa State | L 55–71 | 10–17 (3–13) | Hilton Coliseum (10,871); Ames, IA |
| March 2, 2022; 7:00 p.m., ESPN+ | | TCU | W 83-79 | 11–17 (4–13) | United Supermarkets Arena (4,032); Lubbock, TX |
| March 6, 2022; 2:00 p.m. | | at No. 5 Baylor | L 57–82 | 11–18 (4–14) | Ferrell Center (5,110); Waco, TX |
Big 12 Women's Tournament
| March 10, 2021; 5:30 p.m., ESPN+ | (8) | vs. (9) Oklahoma State; First Round | L 58–73 | 11–19 | Municipal Auditorium (3,155); Kansas City, Missouri |
*Non-conference game. ^{#}Rankings from AP Poll. (#) Tournament seedings in parentheses. All times are in Central Time.

== Rankings ==
Regular season polls
| Poll | Pre- season | Week 2 | Week 3 | Week 4 | Week 5 | Week 6 | Week 7 | Week 8 | Week 9 | Week 10 | Week 11 | Week 12 | Week 13 | Week 14 | Week 15 | Week 16 | Final |
|---|---|---|---|---|---|---|---|---|---|---|---|---|---|---|---|---|---|
| AP | | | | | | | | | | | | | | | | | |
| Coaches | | | | | | | | | | | | | | | | | |

Legend
| | Increase in ranking |
| | Decrease in ranking |
| | Not ranked previous week |
| (RV) | ReceivedvVotes |
| (NR) | Not ranked and did not receive votes |

The Coaches Poll did not release a Week 2 poll, and the AP Poll did not release a poll after the NCAA Tournament.

== See also ==
- 2021–22 Texas Tech Red Raiders basketball team
