= 2021–22 West Virginia Mountaineers women's basketball team =

Intercollegiate basketball season

2021–22 West Virginia Mountaineers women's basketball
- Conference: Big 12 Conference
- Record: 15–15 (7–11 Big 12)
- Head coach: Mike Carey (21st season)
- Assistant coaches: Bett Shelby; Craig Carey; Nitra Perry
- Home arena: WVU Coliseum

2021–22 Big 12 Conference women's basketball standings
	Conf.				Overall
Team	W		L	PCT	W		L	PCT
No. 7 Baylor	15	–	3	.833	28	–	7	.800
No. 10 Iowa State	14	–	4	.778	28	–	7	.800
No. 6 Texas †	13	–	5	.722	29	–	7	.806
No. 22 Oklahoma	12	–	6	.667	25	–	9	.735
Kansas	11	–	7	.611	21	–	10	.677
Kansas State	9	–	9	.500	20	–	13	.606
West Virginia	7	–	11	.389	15	–	15	.500
Texas Tech	4	–	14	.222	11	–	19	.367
Oklahoma State	3	–	15	.167	9	–	20	.310
TCU	2	–	16	.111	6	–	22	.214
† 2022 Big 12 Tournament winner Rankings from AP poll

The 2021–22 West Virginia Mountaineers women's basketball team represented West Virginia University during the 2021–22 NCAA Division I women's basketball season. The Mountaineers were coached by twenty first-year head coach Mike Carey, played their home games at WVU Coliseum and were members of the Big 12 Conference.

They finished the season 15–15 overall and, 7–11 in Big 12 play to finish in seventh place. As the seventh seed in the Big 12 Tournament, they defeated TCU in the First Round before losing to Iowa State in the Second Round. They were not invited to the NCAA tournament or the WNIT.

== Previous season ==
The Mountaineers finished the season 22–7, 13–5 in Big 12 play to finish in a tie for second place. As the second seed in the Big 12 Tournament, they defeated Kansas State and Oklahoma State before losing to Baylor in the Final. They received an at-large bid to the NCAA tournament. As the four seed in the HemisFair Regional they defeated Lehigh before losing to Georgia Tech in the Second Round to end their season.

== Roster ==
2021–22 West Virginia Mountaineers women's basketball team
Players
Coaches

Pos.	#	Name	Height	Year	Previous school	Hometown
G	00	Jayla Hemingway	5 ft 11 in (1.8 m)	Jr	Houston; Mississippi State	Collierville, TN
G	2	Winter Rogers	5 ft 11 in (1.8 m)	Fr	Little Rock Christian Academy	Little Rock, AR
G	3	Kirsten Deans	5 ft 8 in (1.73 m)	Jr	Connections Academy	Greensboro, NC
G	5	Jasmine Carson	5 ft 10 in (1.78 m)	Sr	McEachern; Georgia Tech	Memphis, TN
G	11	JJ Quinerly	5 ft 8 in (1.73 m)	Fr	Lake Taylor	Norfolk, VA
F	12	Esmery Martínez	6 ft 2 in (1.88 m)	Jr	Hamilton Heights Christian	Hato Mayor del Rey, Dominican Republic
F	13	Messiah Hunter	6 ft 2 in (1.88 m)	Fr	TPLS Christian Academy	Hopewell, VA
F	14	Kari Niblack	6 ft 1 in (1.85 m)	Sr	Wildwood	Leesburg, FL
C	20	Yemiyah Morris	6 ft 6 in (1.98 m)	GS	Canyon Springs HS; Mississippi State	San Bernardino, CA
C	22	Blessing Ejiofor	6 ft 5 in (1.96 m)	GS	Paterson Eastside; Chipola CC	Ebonyi, Nigeria
F	23	Isis Beh	6 ft 3 in (1.91 m)	RS So	Murray; Salt Lake City CC	Murray, UT
G	24	Savannah Samuel	6 ft 1 in (1.85 m)	So	St. Francis HS; Oregon State	Woodstock, GA
G	30	Madisen Smith	5 ft 5 in (1.65 m)	Sr	Greenville Senior	Greenville, SC
C	33	Jeanna Cunningham	6 ft 4 in (1.93 m)	So	St. Francis Prep	Brentwood, NY

Head coach

- Mike Carey (Salem)

Assistant coach(es)

- Bett Shelby (Greensboro)
- Craig Carey (West Virginia)
- Nitra Perry (Mississippi State)

Legend

- (C) Team captain
- (S) Suspended
- (I) Ineligible
- (W) Walk-on
- Injured
- Current redshirt

Roster
Last update: April 11, 2022

== Schedule ==
Date time, TV	Rank^{#}	Opponent^{#}	Result	Record	Site (attendance) city, state
Exhibition
October 28, 2021*; 7:00 p.m.	No. 19	West Virginia Tech	W 113–33	–	WVU Coliseum; Morgantown, WV
Non-conference regular season
November 16, 2021*; 7:00 p.m.	No. 22	Saint Francis	W 86–33	1–0	WVU Coliseum (1,107); Morgantown, WV
November 19, 2021*; Noon	No. 22	Kennesaw State	W 78–58	2–0	WVU Coliseum (1,067); Morgantown, WV
November 21, 2021*; 2:00 p.m.	No. 22	Radford	W 83–31	3–0	WVU Coliseum (1,306); Morgantown, WV
November 25, 2021*; 5:00 p.m., FloHoops	No. 22	vs. Purdue; St. Pete Showcase	W 65–57	4–0	McArthur Gymnasium (401); St. Petersburg, FL
November 27, 2021*; 1:00 p.m., FloHoops	No. 22	vs. BYU; St. Pete Showcase	L 57–58	4–1	McArthur Gymnasium (387); St. Petersburg, FL
December 1, 2021*; 7:00 p.m., SECN+		at No. 16 Kentucky; Big 12/SEC Challenge	L 60–83	4–2	Memorial Coliseum (3,587); Lexington, KY
December 7, 2021*; 7:00 p.m.		Charlotte	W 65–54	5–2	WVU Coliseum (1,205); Morgantown, WV
December 12, 2021*; 2:00 p.m.		at James Madison	W 75–68 ^{OT}	6–2	Atlantic Union Bank Center (2,606); Harrisonburg, VA
December 20, 2021*; 1:15 p.m., FloHoops		vs. No. 16 USF; West Palm Beach Invitational	L 55–77	6–3	Massimino Court; West Palm Beach, FL
December 21, 2021*; 11:00 a.m., FloHoops		vs. Michigan State; West Palm Beach Invitational	W 74–54	7–3	Massimino Court; West Palm Beach, FL
December 29, 2021*; 7:00 p.m.		Maryland Eastern Shore	Canceled		WVU Coliseum; Morgantown, WV
Big 12 Regular season
January 2, 2022; 3:00 p.m.		at No. 14 Iowa State	L 72–88	7–4 (0–1)	Hilton Coliseum (9,092); Ames, IA
January 8, 2022; 7:00 p.m.		Kansas State	L 61–71	7–5 (0–2)	WVU Coliseum (1,639); Morgantown, WV
January 12, 2022; 7:00 p.m.		Texas Tech	W 64–53	8–5 (1–2)	WVU Coliseum (1,075); Morgantown, WV
January 15, 2022; 7:00 p.m.		at No. 13 Texas	L 57–73	8–6 (1–3)	Frank Erwin Center (2,843); Austin, TX
January 19, 2022; 7:00 p.m.		No. 14 Oklahoma	L 76–88	8–7 (1–4)	WVU Coliseum (1,084); Morgantown, WV
January 22, 2022; 1:00 p.m.		at Oklahoma State	W 61–57	9–7 (2–4)	Gallagher-Iba Arena (2,046); Stillwater, OK
January 25, 2022; 7:00 p.m.		TCU	W 66–54	10–7 (3–4)	WVU Coliseum (1,126); Morgantown, WV
January 29, 2022; 2:00 p.m.		No. 11 Baylor	L 54–87	10–8 (3–5)	WVU Coliseum (3,836); Morgantown, WV
February 2, 2022; 4:30 p.m.		at TCU	W 70–62	11–8 (4–5)	Schollmaier Arena (1,265); Fort Worth, TX
February 5, 2022; 3:00 p.m.		at No. 18 Oklahoma	L 99–101 ^{2OT}	11–9 (4–6)	Lloyd Noble Center (2,404); Norman, OK
February 9, 2022; 7:00 p.m.		Kansas	L 47–65	11–10 (4–7)	WVU Coliseum (1,151); Morgantown, WV
February 12, 2022; 5:00 p.m.		at No. 10 Baylor	L 57–75	11–11 (4–8)	Ferrell Center (5,240); Waco, TX
February 15, 2022; 7:00 p.m.		at Kansas	L 63–74	11–12 (4–9)	Allen Fieldhouse (854); Lawrence, KS
February 20, 2022; Noon		No. 14 Texas	L 58–67	11–13 (4–10)	WVU Coliseum (2,392); Morgantown, WV
February 23, 2022; 7:00 p.m.		at Texas Tech	W 73–62	12–13 (5–10)	United Supermarkets Arena (3,410); Lubbock, TX
February 27, 2022; 1:00 p.m.		Oklahoma State	W 60–56	13–13 (6–10)	WVU Coliseum (2,200); Morgantown, WV
March 2, 2022; 6:30 p.m.		at Kansas State	W 74–62 ^{2OT}	14–13 (7–10)	Bramlage Coliseum (3,478); Manhattan, KS
March 5, 2022; 7:00 p.m.		Iowa State	L 57–74	14–14 (7–11)	WVU Coliseum (1,823); Morgantown, WV
Big 12 Women's Tournament
March 10, 2022; 9:00 p.m., ESPN+	(7)	vs. (10) TCU; Fist Round	W 68–48	15–14	Municipal Auditorium; Kansas City, MO
March 11, 2022; 6:00 p.m., ESPN+	(7)	vs. (2) No. 10 Iowa State; Quarterfinals	L 60–66	15–15	Municipal Auditorium; Kansas City, MO
*Non-conference game. ^{#}Rankings from AP Poll. (#) Tournament seedings in parentheses. All times are in Eastern Time.

== Rankings ==
Ranking movements Legend: ██ Increase in ranking ██ Decrease in ranking — = Not ranked RV = Received votes
	Week																			
Poll	Pre	1	2	3	4	5	6	7	8	9	10	11	12	13	14	15	16	17	18	Final
AP	19	22	22	RV	RV	RV	—	—	—	—	—	—	—	—	—	—	—	—	—	—
Coaches	23	23	RV	RV	RV	—	—	—	—	—	—	—	—	—	—	—	—	—	—	—
