= 2021 NCAA Women's Basketball All-Americans =

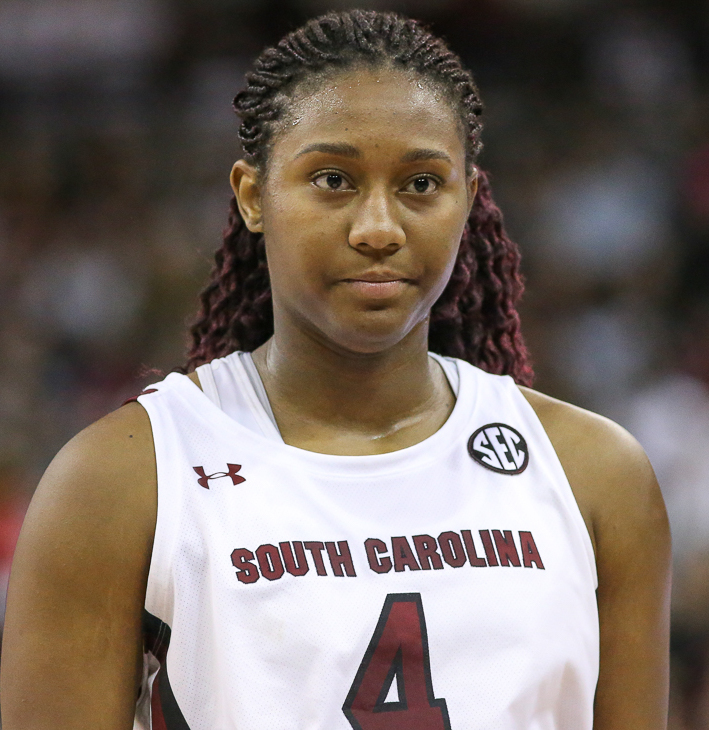
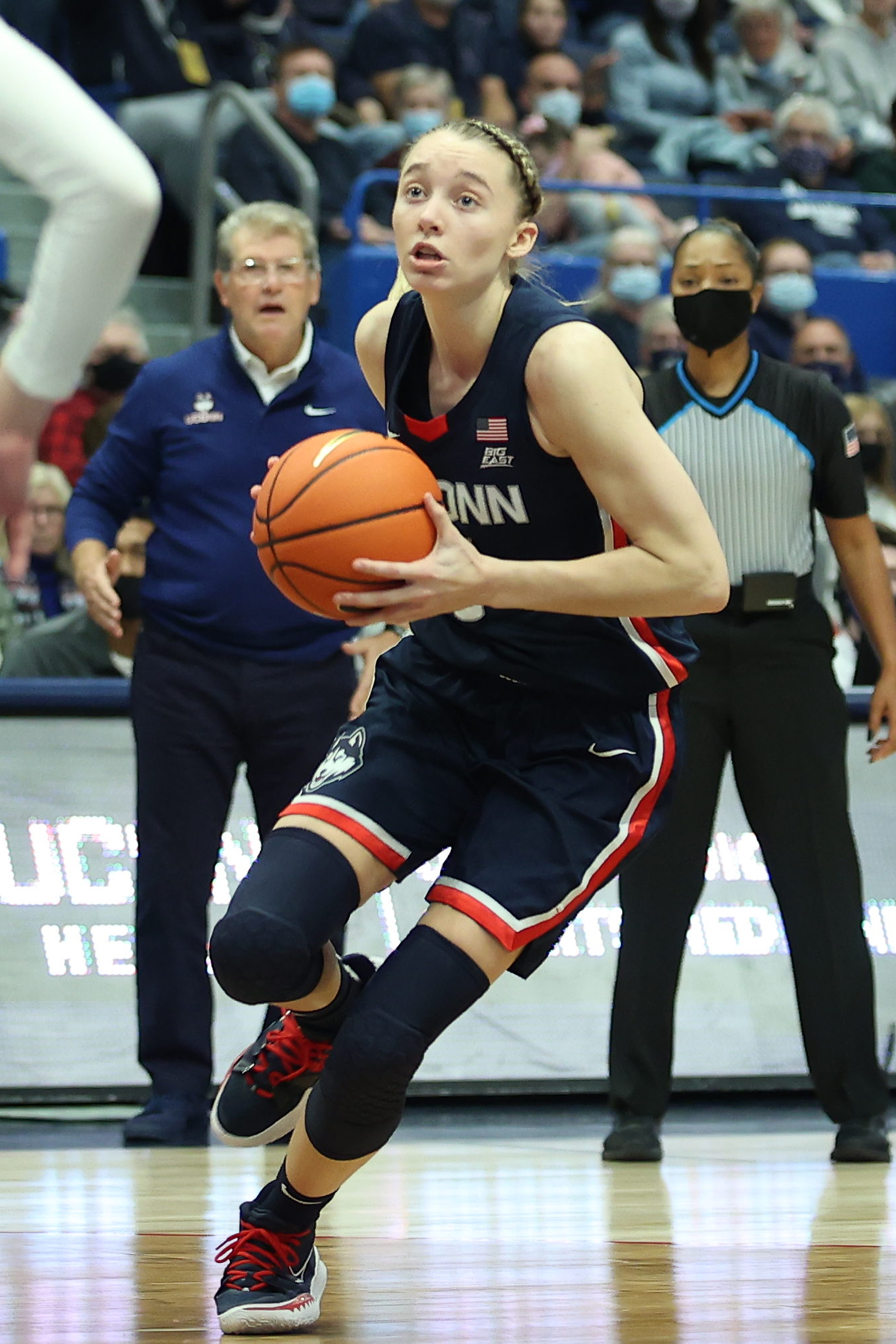
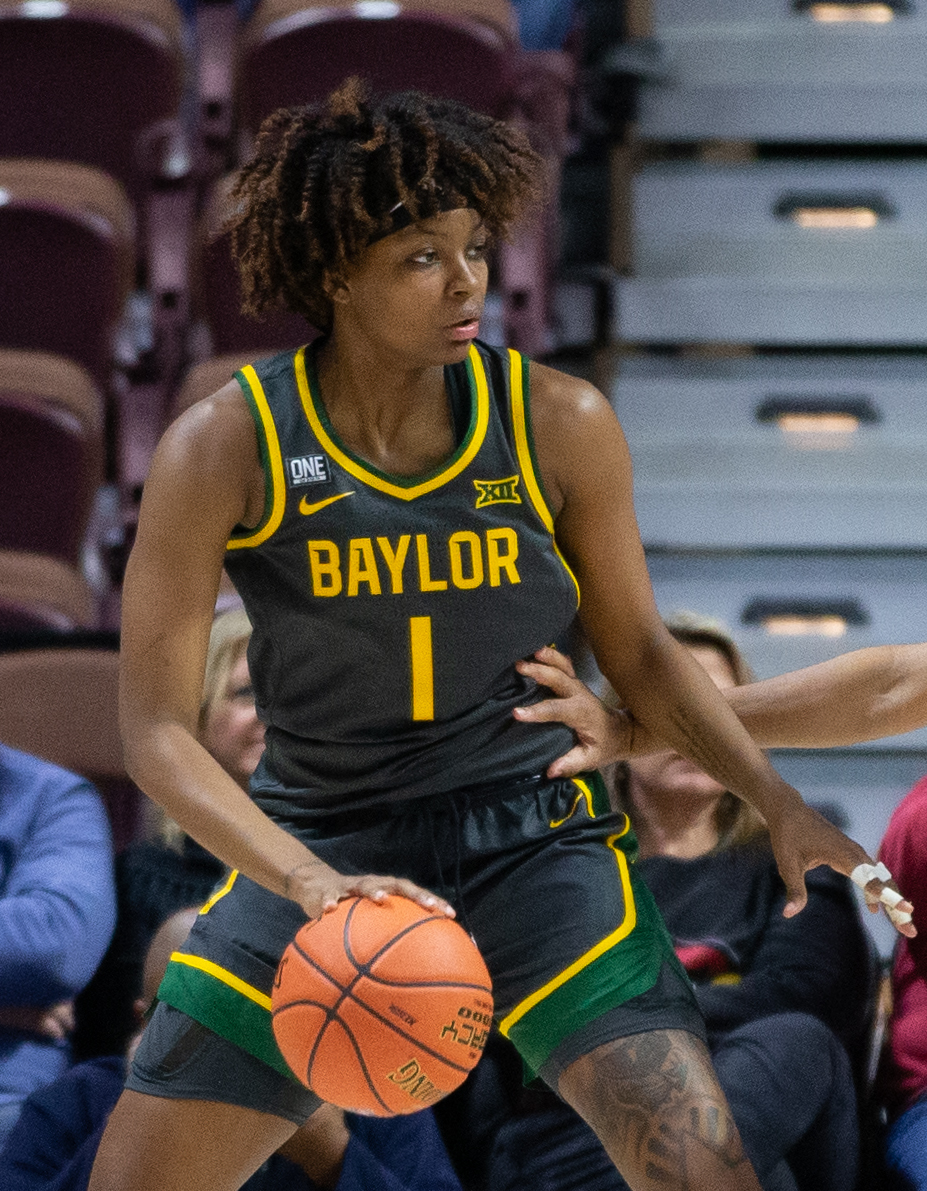
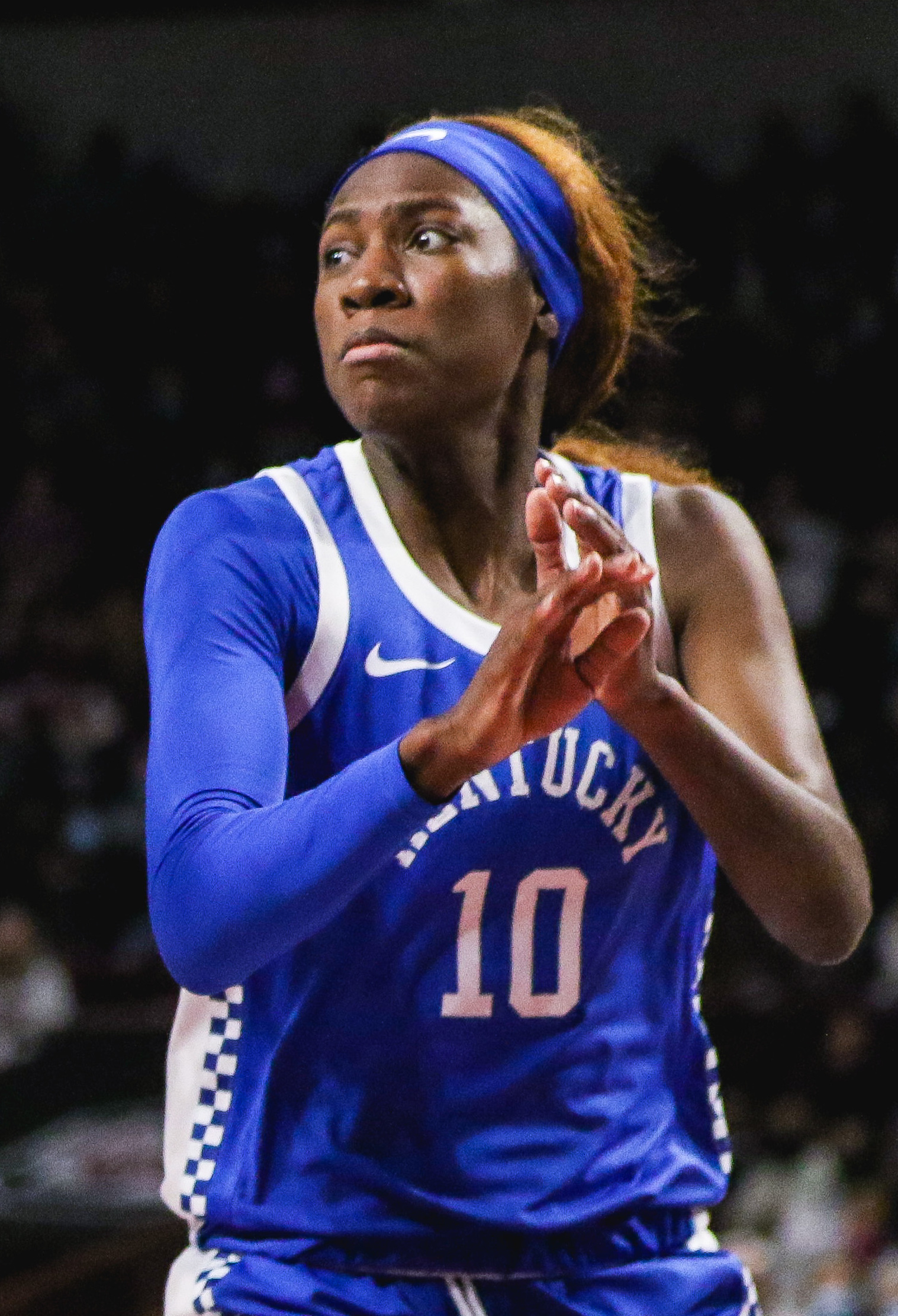
- Members of the 2021 All-America first team (AP, USBWA). Clockwise from upper left: Boston, Bueckers, Howard, and Smith. Dana Evans not pictured.
- Awarded for: 2020–21 NCAA Division I women's basketball season

An All-American team is an honorary sports team composed of the best amateur players of a specific season for each team position—who in turn are given the honorific "All-America" and typically referred to as "All-American athletes", or simply "All-Americans". Although the honorees generally do not compete together as a unit, the term is used in U.S. team sports to refer to players who are selected by members of the national media. Walter Camp selected the first All-America team in the early days of American football in 1889. The 2021 NCAA Women's Basketball All-Americans are honorary lists that include All-American selections from the Associated Press (AP), the United States Basketball Writers Association (USBWA), and the Women's Basketball Coaches Association (WBCA) for the 2020–21 NCAA Division I women's basketball season. Both AP and USBWA choose three teams, while WBCA lists 10 honorees.

A consensus All-America team in women's basketball has never been organized. This differs from the practice in men's basketball, in which the NCAA uses a combination of selections by AP, USBWA, the National Association of Basketball Coaches (NABC), and Sporting News to determine a consensus All-America team. The selection of a consensus All-America men's basketball team is possible because all four organizations select at least a first and second team, with only the USBWA not selecting a third team.

Before the 2017–18 season, it was impossible for a consensus women's All-America team to be determined because the AP had been the only body that divided its women's selections into separate teams. The USBWA first named separate teams in 2017–18. The women's counterpart to the NABC, the Women's Basketball Coaches Association (WBCA), continues the USBWA's former practice of selecting a single 10-member (plus ties) team. Before the 2023–24 season, Sporting News did not select an All-America team in women's basketball.

== By selector ==
=== Associated Press (AP) ===
Announced on March 17, 2021.

First team		Second team		Third team	
Player	School	Player	School	Player	School
Aliyah Boston	South Carolina	Caitlin Clark	Iowa	Chelsea Dungee	Arkansas
Paige Bueckers	UConn	Charli Collier	Texas	Natasha Mack	Oklahoma State
Dana Evans	Louisville	Elissa Cunane	NC State	Michaela Onyenwere	UCLA
Rhyne Howard	Kentucky	Naz Hillmon	Michigan	Ashley Owusu	Maryland
NaLyssa Smith	Baylor	Aari McDonald	Arizona	Kiana Williams	Stanford

==== AP Honorable Mention ====
- Kierstan Bell, Florida Gulf Coast
- Katie Benzan, Maryland
- Jakia Brown-Turner, NC State
- Rennia Davis, Tennessee
- Kysre Gondrezick, West Virginia
- Arella Guirantes, Rutgers

- Lauren Gustin, BYU
- Mackenzie Holmes, Indiana
- Cece Hooks, Ohio
- Ashley Joens, Iowa State
- Haley Jones, Stanford
- N'dea Jones, Texas A&M

- Olivia Nelson-Ododa, UConn
- Aisha Sheppard, Virginia Tech
- Jill Townsend, Gonzaga
- Christyn Williams, UConn
- Aaliyah Wilson, Texas A&M
- Jenn Wirth, Gonzaga

=== United States Basketball Writers Association (USBWA) ===
Announced on April 2, 2021.

First team		Second team		Third team	
Player	School	Player	School	Player	School
Aliyah Boston	South Carolina	Charli Collier	Texas	Chelsea Dungee	Arkansas
Paige Bueckers	UConn	Elissa Cunane	NC State	Ashley Joens	Iowa State
Caitlin Clark	Iowa	Aari McDonald	Arizona	Natasha Mack	Oklahoma State
Dana Evans	Louisville	NaLyssa Smith	Baylor	Michaela Onyenwere	UCLA
Naz Hillmon	Michigan	Kiana Williams	Stanford	Ashley Owusu	Maryland
Rhyne Howard	Kentucky				

=== Women's Basketball Coaches Association (WBCA) ===
Announced on April 3, 2021.

Player	School
Aliiyah Boston	South Carolina
Paige Bueckers	UConn
Caitlin Clark	Iowa
Chelsea Dungee	Arkansas
Dana Evans	Louisville
Naz Hillmon	Michigan
Rhyne Howard	Kentucky
Aari McDonald	Arizona
NaLyssa Smith	Baylor
Kiana Williams	Stanford

== By player ==
Player	School	Year	AP	USBWA	WBCA	Notes
Aliyah Boston	South Carolina		1	1	1	
Paige Bueckers	UConn		1	1	1	
Dana Evans	Louisville		1	1	1	
Rhyne Howard	Kentucky		1	1	1	
NaLyssa Smith	Baylor		1	2	1	

== Academic All-Americans ==
The College Sports Information Directors of America (CoSIDA) announced its 15-member 2021 Academic All-America team on May 28, 2021, divided into first, second and third teams, with Aliyah Boston of South Carolina chosen as women's college basketball Academic All-American of the Year, also becoming the first sophomore so honored in D-I women's basketball.

First Team
Player	School	Class	GPA and major
Aliyah Boston	South Carolina	So.	3.81, Mass Communications
Kailey Coffey	Northern Kentucky	Sr.	4.00, Chemistry/Biochemistry
Vivian Gray (Note: Third team in 2019–20.)	Texas Tech	GS	3.58/4.00, Interdisciplinary Studies
Lexie Hull	Stanford	Jr.	3.92, Management Science & Engineering
Sam Thomas	Arizona	GS	3.97/4.00, Psychology (UG) / Organizational Leadership (G)

Second Team
Player	School	Class	GPA and major
Dana Evans	Louisville	Sr.	3.49, Sport Administration
Ayoka Lee	Kansas State	Jr.	3.88, Psychology
Ali Patberg	Indiana	GS	3.71/4.00, Finance (UG) / Recreational Administration (G)
Myah Selland	South Dakota State	Jr.	3.97, Exercise Science / Community & Public Health
Kiana Williams	Stanford	Sr.	3.38, Science, Technology & Society

Third Team
Player	School	Class	GPA and major
Laura Bagwell Katalinich	Minnesota	GS	3.93/4.00, Communications (UG) / Sport Management (G)
Conley Chinn	Belmont	Sr.	4.00, Psychology
Elissa Cunane	NC State	Jr.	3.34, Fisheries, Wildlife & Conservation Biology
Lainey Gosnell	Appalachian State	GS	4.00/4.00, Psychology
Dariauna Lewis	Alabama A&M	Jr.	3.77, Biology

== Senior All-Americans ==
The 10 finalists for the Senior CLASS Award, called Senior All-Americans, were announced on February 22, 2021. Rennia Davis of Tennessee was named the recipient on April 2, with the first and second teams also being announced at that time.

=== First team ===
Player	Position	School
Rennia Davis	Guard	Tennessee
Dana Evans	Guard	Louisville
Blanca Millán	Guard	Maine
Michaela Onyenwere	Forward	UCLA
Jill Townsend	Guard	Gonzaga

=== Second team ===
Player	Position	School
Arella Guirantes	Guard	Rutgers
Nancy Mulkey	Center	Rice
IImar’I Thomas	Forward	Cincinnati
Unique Thompson	Forward	Auburn
Mariah White	Guard	Cleveland State
