= 2020–21 TCU Horned Frogs women's basketball team =

Intercollegiate basketball season

2020–21 TCU Horned Frogs women's basketball
- Conference: Big 12 Conference
- Record: 10–15 (4–14 Big 12)
- Head coach: Raegan Pebley (7th season)
- Assistant coaches: Hanna Howard; Britney Brown; Abi Olajuwon
- Home arena: Schollmaier Arena

2020–21 Big 12 Conference women's basketball standings
| | Conf. | | | | Overall |
| Team | W | | L | PCT | W | | L | PCT |
|---|---|---|---|---|---|---|---|---|
| No. 5 Baylor† | 17 | – | 1 | .944 | 28 | – | 2 | .933 |
| No. 17 West Virginia | 13 | – | 5 | .722 | 22 | – | 7 | .759 |
| Oklahoma State | 13 | – | 5 | .722 | 19 | – | 9 | .679 |
| Iowa State | 12 | – | 6 | .667 | 17 | – | 11 | .607 |
| Texas | 11 | – | 7 | .611 | 20 | – | 9 | .690 |
| Oklahoma | 9 | – | 9 | .500 | 12 | – | 12 | .500 |
| Texas Tech | 5 | – | 13 | .278 | 10 | – | 15 | .400 |
| TCU | 4 | – | 14 | .222 | 10 | – | 15 | .400 |
| Kansas State | 3 | – | 15 | .167 | 9 | – | 18 | .333 |
| Kansas | 3 | – | 15 | .167 | 7 | – | 18 | .280 |
† 2021 Big 12 Tournament winner As of March 28, 2021; Rankings from AP poll

The 2020–21 TCU Horned Frogs women's basketball team represented Texas Christian University in the 2020–21 NCAA Division I women's basketball season. This was head coach Raegan Pebley's seventh season at TCU. The Horned Frogs were members of the Big 12 Conference and played their home games in Schollmaier Arena.

The Horned Frogs finished the season 10–15, 4–14 in Big 12 play, to finish in eight place. In the Big 12 tournament, they defeated Kansas in the first round, before losing to eventual champion Baylor in the quarterfinals. They were not invited to the NCAA tournament or the WNIT.

== Previous season ==
The Horned Frogs finished the season 22–7, 13–5 in Big 12 play, to finish in second place. The Big 12 tournament, NCAA women's basketball tournament and WNIT were all cancelled before they began, due to the COVID-19 pandemic.

== Roster ==
2020–21 TCU Horned Frogs women's basketball team
Players
Coaches

| Pos. | # | Name | Height | Year | Previous school | Hometown |
|---|---|---|---|---|---|---|
| G | 0 | Caroline Germond | 5 ft 7 in (1.7 m) | Jr | South Plains CC | Angers, France |
| G | 1 | Aahliyah Jackson | 5 ft 10 in (1.78 m) | GS | Northside | Fort Smith, AR |
| G | 4 | Amari Conn | 5 ft 7 in (1.7 m) | Fr | Lincoln Prep | Kansas City, MO |
| F | 5 | Yummy Morris | 6 ft 3 in (1.91 m) | Jr | North Little Rock | North Little Rock, AR |
| G | 10 | Emma Schmidt | 5 ft 9 in (1.75 m) | Sr | Waukee | Waukee, IA |
| G/F | 11 | Maddi Puli | 6 ft 2 in (1.88 m) | So | MacKillop College | Werribee, Australia |
| F | 12 | Aaliyah Morgan | 6 ft 1 in (1.85 m) | Fr | Lee | Tyler, TX |
| G | 13 | Tavy Diggs | 6 ft 2 in (1.88 m) | So | Plano East | Richardson, TX |
| G | 15 | Aja Holmes | 5 ft 8 in (1.73 m) | Fr | Steele | Cibolo, TX |
| G | 20 | Lauren Heard | 5 ft 9 in (1.75 m) | Sr | Guyer | Denton, TX |
| C | 22 | Kayla Mokwuah | 6 ft 4 in (1.93 m) | Jr | Wilbraham & Monson | Longmeadow, MA |
| F | 23 | Michelle Berry | 6 ft 2 in (1.88 m) | GS | Miami Country Day; Virginia Tech | Miami, FL |
| F | 24 | Adhel Tac | 5 ft 11 in (1.8 m) | Fr | Sachse | Garland, TX |
| F | 32 | Patricia Morris | 6 ft 7 in (2.01 m) | Jr | Duarte | Duarte, CA |

Head coach

- Raegan Pebley (Colorado)

Assistant coach(es)

- Hanna Howard (Portland)
- Britney Brown (Oklahoma)
- Abi Olajuwon (Oklahoma)

Legend

- (C) Team captain
- (S) Suspended
- (I) Ineligible
- (W) Walk-on
- Injured
- Current redshirt

Roster
Last update: June 14, 2021

== Schedule and results ==
| Date time, TV | Rank^{#} | Opponent^{#} | Result | Record | Site (attendance) city, state |
Regular season
| November 25, 2020*; 1:00 p.m., ESPN+ | | Incarnate Word | W 84–59 | 1–0 | Schollmaier Arena (844); Fort Worth, TX |
| November 28, 2021*; 1:00 p.m., ESPN+ | | Central Arkansas | W 65–48 | 2–0 | Schollmaier Arena (802); Fort Worth, TX |
| December 2, 2020; 6:30 p.m., ESPN+ | | No. 23 Iowa State | L 68–91 | 2–1 (0–1) | Schollmaier Arena (715); Fort Worth, TX |
| December 6, 2020*; 2:00 p.m., SECN+ | | at Missouri; Big 12/SEC Women's Challenge | Canceled | | Mizzou Arena; Columbia, MO |
| December 9, 2020*; 11:00 a.m., ESPN+ | | Lamar | W 79–53 | 3–1 | Schollmaier Arena (768); Fort Worth, TX |
| December 13, 2020*; 1:00 p.m., ESPN+ | | Middle Tennessee | W 83–77 | 4–1 | Schollmaier Arena (736); Fort Worth, TX |
| December 19, 2020; 2:00 p.m., ESPN+ | | at Texas Tech | L 72–78 | 4–2 (0–2) | United Supermarkets Arena (2,612); Lubbock, TX |
| December 22, 2020*; 1:00 p.m., ESPN+ | | Oral Roberts | W 62–48 | 5–2 | Schollmaier Arena (841); Fort Worth, TX |
| January 2, 2021; 1:00 p.m., ESPN+ | | No. 7 Baylor | L 50–74 | 5–3 (0–3) | Schollmaier Arena (1,605); Fort Worth, TX |
| January 6, 2021; 6:30 p.m., ESPN+ | | Oklahoma State | L 53–78 | 5–4 (0–4) | Schollmaier Arena (760); Fort Worth, TX |
| January 9, 2021; 2:00 p.m., ESPN+ | | at Oklahoma State | L 50–69 | 5–5 (0–5) | Gallagher-Iba Arena (1,059); Stillwater, OK |
| January 17, 2021; 1:00 p.m., ESPN+ | | Kansas | W 81–75 ^{OT} | 6–5 (1–5) | Schollmaier Arena (914); Fort Worth, TX |
| January 20, 2021; 7:00 p.m., LHN | | at Texas | L 54–71 | 6–6 (1–6) | Frank Erwin Center (0); Austin, TX |
| January 23, 2021; 1:00 p.m., ESPN+ | | Texas Tech | W 61–53 | 7–6 (2–6) | Schollmaier Arena (1,165); Fort Worth, TX |
| January 26, 2021; 7:00 p.m., ESPN+ | | at No. 9 Baylor | L 49–82 | 7–7 (2–7) | Ferrell Center (2,261); Waco, TX |
| January 30, 2021; 1:00 p.m., ESPN+ | | No. 24 West Virginia | L 70–79 | 7–8 (2–8) | Schollmaier Arena (904); Fort Worth, TX |
| February 7, 2021; 1:30 p.m., ESPN+ | | at Kansas | L 72–82 | 7–9 (2–9) | Allen Fieldhouse (352); Lawrence, KS |
| February 10, 2021; 6:30 p.m., ESPN+ | | Kansas State | W 78–67 | 8–9 (3–9) | Schollmaier Arena (824); Fort Worth, TX |
| February 13, 2021; 7:00 p.m., ESPN+ | | at Iowa State | L 81–92 | 8–10 (3–10) | Hilton Coliseum (762); Ames, IA |
| February 20, 2021; 1:00 p.m., ESPN+ | | at No. 19 West Virginia | L 78–81 | 8–11 (3–11) | WVU Coliseum (1,236); Morgantown, WV |
| February 24, 2021; 6:30 p.m., ESPN+ | | Oklahoma | L 60–76 | 8–12 (3–12) | Schollmaier Arena (854); Fort Worth, TX |
| March 1, 2021; 6:30 p.m., ESPN+ | | at Kansas State | L 76–79 ^{OT} | 8–13 (3–13) | Bramlage Coliseum (503); Manhattan, KS |
| March 4, 2021; 5:00 p.m., BSO | | at Oklahoma | W 83–79 | 9–13 (4–13) | Lloyd Noble Center (423); Norman, OK |
| March 7, 2021; 5:00 p.m., ESPN+ | | Texas | L 60–69 | 9–14 (4–14) | Schollmaier Arena (1,091); Fort Worth, TX |
Big 12 women's tournament
| March 11, 2021; 5:00 p.m., ESPN+ | (8) | vs. (9) Kansas; First round | W 75–72 | 10–14 | Municipal Auditorium (662); Kansas City, MO |
| March 12, 2021; 1:30 p.m., ESPNU | (8) | vs. (1) No. 6 Baylor; Quarterfinals | L 55–92 | 10–15 | Municipal Auditorium (788); Kansas City, MO |
*Non-conference game. ^{#}Rankings from AP poll. (#) Tournament seedings in parentheses. All times are in Central Time.

== Rankings ==
Regular-season polls
| Poll | Pre- season | Week 2 | Week 3 | Week 4 | Week 5 | Week 6 | Week 7 | Week 8 | Week 9 | Week 10 | Week 11 | Week 12 | Week 13 | Week 14 | Week 15 | Week 16 | Final |
|---|---|---|---|---|---|---|---|---|---|---|---|---|---|---|---|---|---|
| AP | | | | | | | | | | | | | | | | | |
| Coaches | | | | | | | | | | | | | | | | | |

Legend
| | Increase in ranking |
| | Decrease in ranking |
| | Not ranked previous week |
| (RV) | Received votes |
| (NR) | Not ranked and did not receive votes |

The Coaches Poll did not release a Week 2 poll, and the AP poll did not release a poll after the NCAA tournament.

== See also ==
- 2020–21 TCU Horned Frogs men's basketball team
