= Jeff Mittie =

American basketball coach

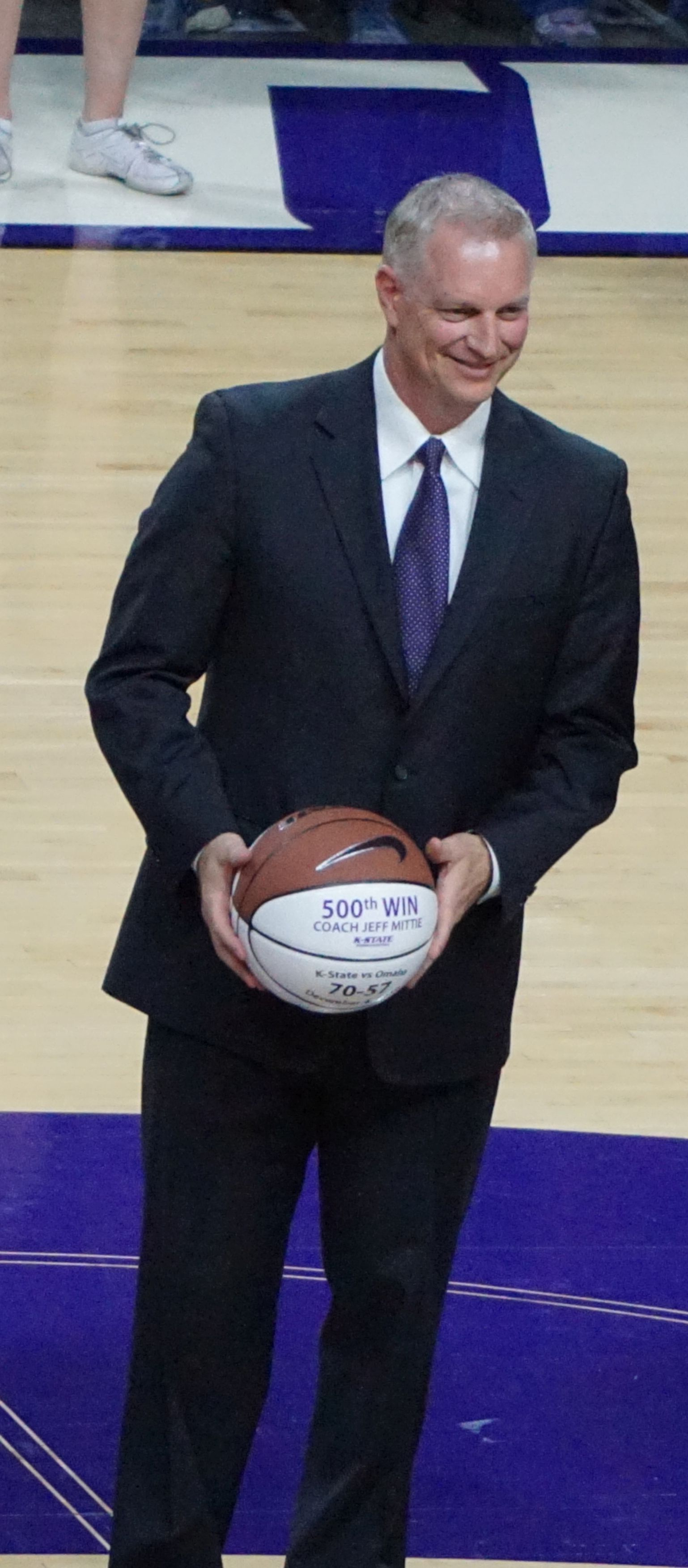
- Mittie in 2016

Current position
- Title: Head coach
- Team: Kansas State
- Conference: Big 12
- Record: 237–161 (.595)

Biographical details
- Born: June 24, 1966 (age 60); Blue Springs, Missouri, U.S.
- Education: Missouri Western ('89)

Coaching career (HC unless noted)
- 1992–1995: Missouri Western
- 1995–1999: Arkansas State
- 1999–2014: TCU
- 2014–present: Kansas State

Head coaching record
- Overall: 691–396 (.636)
- Tournaments: 11–15 (NCAA); 9–6 (WNIT); 1–1 (WBIT)

Jeffrey Dean Mittie (born June 24, 1966) is the current head coach of the Kansas State University women's basketball team.

== Career ==
Prior to joining the Wildcats, he was the head coach of TCU Horned Frogs women's basketball team.

He is the all-time wins leader at TCU with 303 wins.

== Head coaching record ==
Record table
Season	Team	Overall	Conference	Standing	Postseason
Missouri Western Griffons (Mid-America Intercollegiate Athletic Association) (1992–1995)
1992–93	Missouri Western	16–11	9–7	3rd	
1993–94	Missouri Western	29–3	16–0	1st	NCAA DII Elite Eight
1994–95	Missouri Western	31–3	15–1	1st	NCAA DII Final Four
Missouri Western:		76–17 (.817)	40–8 (.833)		
Arkansas State Red Wolves (Sun Belt Conference) (1995–1999)
1995–96	Arkansas State	17–10	9–5	3rd	
1996–97	Arkansas State	20–8	10–4	3rd	
1997–98	Arkansas State	20–10	11–3	3rd	
1998–99	Arkansas State	18–14	7–5	4th	WNIT Quarterfinals
Arkansas State:		75–42 (.641)	37–17 (.685)		
TCU Horned Frogs (Western Athletic Conference) (1999–2001)
1999–00	TCU	16–14	7–7	5th	
2000–01	TCU	25–8	13–3	1st	NCAA Second Round
TCU Horned Frogs (Conference USA) (2001–2005)
2001–02	TCU	24–7	12–2	1st	NCAA Second Round
2002–03	TCU	20–14	8–6	T–5th	NCAA Second Round
2003–04	TCU	25–7	11–3	T–2nd	NCAA Second Round
2004–05	TCU	23–10	10–4	T–3rd	NCAA First Round
TCU Horned Frogs (Mountain West Conference) (2005–2012)
2005–06	TCU	19–12	11–5	T–3rd	NCAA Second Round
2006–07	TCU	21–11	11–5	T–2nd	NCAA First Round
2007–08	TCU	23–12	13–3	2nd	WNIT Quarterfinals
2008–09	TCU	20–11	12–4	3rd	NCAA First Round
2009–10	TCU	22–9	12–4	1st	NCAA First Round
2010–11	TCU	22–11	13–3	2nd	WNIT First Round
2011–12	TCU	16–14	9–5	T–3rd	
TCU Horned Frogs (Big 12 Conference) (2012–2014)
2012–13	TCU	9–21	2–16	10th	
2013–14	TCU	18–15	8–10	7th	WNIT First Round
TCU:		303–176 (.633)	152–80 (.655)		
Kansas State Wildcats (Big 12 Conference) (2014–present)
2014–15	Kansas State	19–14	7–11	T–7th	WNIT Second Round
2015–16	Kansas State	19–13	8–10	T–6th	NCAA Second Round
2016–17	Kansas State	23–11	11–7	4th	NCAA Second Round
2017–18	Kansas State	18–16	7–11	T–7th	WNIT Third Round
2018–19	Kansas State	21–12	11–7	4th	NCAA First Round
2019–20	Kansas State	16–13	10–8	T-4th	Cancelled due to Covid-19
2020–21	Kansas State	9–18	3–15	10th	
2021–22	Kansas State	20–13	9–9	6th	NCAA Second Round
2022–23	Kansas State	19–17	5–13	9th	WNIT Super 16
2023–24	Kansas State	26–8	13–5	3rd	NCAA Second Round
2024–25	Kansas State	28–8	13–5	T-4th	NCAA Sweet Sixteen
2025–26	Kansas State	19–18	8–10	T–11th	WBIT Second Round
Kansas State:		237–161 (.595)	105–111 (.486)		
Total:		691–396 (.636)			
National champion Postseason invitational champion Conference regular season champion Conference regular season and conference tournament champion Division regular season champion Division regular season and conference tournament champion Conference tournament champion

== See also ==
- List of college women's basketball career coaching wins leaders
