= 2020–21 Oklahoma Sooners women's basketball team =

Women's college basketball season

2020–21 Oklahoma Sooners women's basketball
- Conference: Big 12
- Record: 12–12 (9–9 Big 12)
- Head coach: Sherri Coale (25th season)
- Assistant coaches: Courtney Paris; Colton Coale; Jackie Stiles
- Home arena: Lloyd Noble Center

2020–21 Big 12 Conference women's basketball standings
	Conf.				Overall
Team	W		L	PCT	W		L	PCT
No. 5 Baylor†	17	–	1	.944	28	–	2	.933
No. 17 West Virginia	13	–	5	.722	22	–	7	.759
Oklahoma State	13	–	5	.722	19	–	9	.679
Iowa State	12	–	6	.667	17	–	11	.607
Texas	11	–	7	.611	20	–	9	.690
Oklahoma	9	–	9	.500	12	–	12	.500
Texas Tech	5	–	13	.278	10	–	15	.400
TCU	4	–	14	.222	10	–	15	.400
Kansas State	3	–	15	.167	9	–	18	.333
Kansas	3	–	15	.167	7	–	18	.280
† 2021 Big 12 Tournament winner As of March 28, 2021; Rankings from AP poll

The 2020–21 Oklahoma Sooners women's basketball team represented the University of Oklahoma in the 2020–21 NCAA Division I women's basketball season. The Sooners were led by twenty-fifth-year head coach Sherri Coale. The team played its home games at the Lloyd Noble Center in Norman, Oklahoma, as a member of the Big 12 Conference.

After the season, Sherri Coale retired after twenty-five seasons as head coach of the Sooners. Jennie Baranczyk was announced as the new head coach in April 2021.

The Sooners finished the season 12–12, 9–9 in Big 12 play to finish in sixth place. In the Big 12 Tournament, they lost to Oklahoma State in the Quarterfinals. They were not invited to the NCAA tournament or the WNIT.

== Previous season ==
The Sooners ended the season 12–18, 5–13 in Big 12 play to finish in ninth place. The Big 12 Tournament, NCAA women's basketball tournament and WNIT were all cancelled before they began, due to the COVID-19 pandemic.

== Roster ==
2020–21 Oklahoma Sooners women's basketball team
Players
Coaches

Pos.	#	Name	Height	Year	Previous school	Hometown
G	1	Nevaeh Tot	5 ft 3 in (1.6 m)	Fr	John Paul II	McKinney, TX
F	3	Mandy Simpson	6 ft 1 in (1.85 m)	Sr	Boise	Boise, ID
G	12	Gabby Gregory	6 ft 0 in (1.83 m)	So	Holland Hall	Tulsa, OK
F	15	Heavenly Greer	6 ft 3 in (1.91 m)	Fr	Ganesha	Phoenix, AZ
G	22	Ana Llanusa	6 ft 0 in (1.83 m)	Sr	Choctaw	Choctaw, OK
G	24	Skylar Vann	5 ft 10 in (1.78 m)	Fr	Deer Creek	Edmond, OK
G/F	25	Madi Williams	6 ft 0 in (1.83 m)	Jr	Trinity Valley School	Fort Worth, TX
G	30	Taylor Robertson	5 ft 7 in (1.7 m)	Jr	McPherson	McPherson, KS
G	32	Tatum Veitenheimer	5 ft 8 in (1.73 m)	Jr	Windthorst	Windthorst, TX
F	34	Liz Scott	6 ft 2 in (1.88 m)	So	Klein Oak	Tomball, TX

Head coach

- Sherri Coale (Oklahoma Christian)

Assistant coach(es)

- Courtney Paris (Oklahoma)
- Colton Coale (Oklahoma)
- Jackie Stiles (Missouri State)

Legend

- (C) Team captain
- (S) Suspended
- (I) Ineligible
- (W) Walk-on
- Injured
- Current redshirt

Roster
Last update: June 8, 2021

== Schedule ==
Date time, TV	Rank^{#}	Opponent^{#}	Result	Record	Site (attendance) city, state
Regular season
November 25, 2020*; Noon, BSSW		Houston	L 85–97	0–1	Lloyd Noble Center (657); Norman, OK
November 28, 2020*; 5:00 p.m., FloHoops		vs. Gonzaga; Crossover Classic	Canceled		Sanford Pentagon; Sioux Falls, SD
November 29, 2020*; 2:30 p.m., FloHoops		vs. South Carolina; Crossover Classic	Canceled		Sanford Pentagon; Sioux Falls, SD
November 30, 2020*; 5:00 p.m., FloHoops		vs. South Dakota; Crossover Classic	Canceled		Sanford Pentagon; Sioux Falls, SD
December 6, 2020*; 11:00 a.m., SECN		at Georgia; Big 12/SEC Women's Challenge	L 80–93	0–2	Stegeman Coliseum (595); Athens, GA
December 10, 2020; 7:00 p.m., ESPN+		at Kansas	L 67–74	0–3 (0–1)	Allen Fieldhouse (331); Lawrence, KS
December 13, 2020*; 2:00 p.m., BSO		Texas State	W 52–40	1–3	Lloyd Noble Center (597); Norman, OK
December 15, 2020; 7:00 p.m., BSO		Oklahoma State; Bedlam	L 53–66	1–4 (0–2)	Lloyd Noble Center (676); Norman, OK
December 20, 2020*; 2:00 p.m., BSO		South Dakota	W 80–73	2–4	Lloyd Noble Center (608); Norman, OK
December 29, 2020*; 7:00 p.m., BSO		Arkansas–Pine Bluff	W 107–64	3–4	Lloyd Noble Center (583); Norman, OK
January 2, 2021; 7:00 p.m., BSO		Kansas State	Postponed		Lloyd Noble Center; Norman, OK
January 3, 2021; 2:00 p.m.		West Virginia	L 72–90	3–5 (0–3)	Lloyd Noble Center (417); Norman, OK
January 6, 2021; 6:00 p.m., ESPN+		at Texas Tech	W 75–74	4–5 (1–3)	United Supermarkets Arena (2,493); Lubbock, TX
January 9, 2021; 3:00 p.m., BSO		TCU	Postponed		Lloyd Noble Center; Norman, OK
January 12, 2021; 7:00 p.m., LHN		at Texas	Postponed		Frank Erwin Center; Austin, TX
January 19, 2021; 6:30 p.m., ESPN+		at No. 24 Iowa State	L 63–67	4–6 (1–4)	Hilton Coliseum (695); Ames, IA
January 23, 2021; 7:00 p.m., ESPN+		at No. 9 Baylor	L 61–84	4–7 (1–5)	Ferrell Center (2,274); Waco, TX
January 27, 2021; 7:00 p.m., ESPN+		Kansas	W 84–81	5–7 (2–5)	Lloyd Noble Center (678); Norman, OK
January 31, 2021; 1:00 p.m., ESPN+		at Kansas State	W 80–78	6–7 (3–5)	Bramlage Coliseum (740); Manhattan, KS
February 3, 2021; 7:00 p.m., BSO		Texas	L 58–69	6–8 (3–6)	Lloyd Noble Center (717); Norman, OK
February 6, 2021; 7:00 p.m., ESPN+		at Oklahoma State; Bedlam	L 64–91	6–9 (3–7)	Gallagher-Iba Arena (2,219); Stillwater, OK
February 9, 2021; 7:00 p.m., BSO		Iowa State	W 67–61	7–9 (4–7)	Lloyd Noble Center (678); Norman, OK
February 13, 2021; 6:00 p.m.		at No. 19 West Virginia	W 72–71	8–9 (5–7)	WVU Coliseum (1,112); Morgantown, WV
February 17, 2021; 7:00 p.m., BSO		Texas Tech	Postponted		Lloyd Noble Center; Norman, OK
February 21, 2021; 1:00 p.m., BSO		No. 7 Baylor	L 66–77	8–10 (5–8)	Lloyd Noble Center (857); Norman, OK
February 24, 2021; 6:30 p.m., ESPN+		at TCU	W 76–60	9–10 (6–8)	Schollmaier Arena (854); Fort Worth, TX
February 27, 2021; 1:00 p.m., LHN		at Texas	W 68–63 ^{OT}	10–10 (7–8)	Frank Erwin Center (978); Austin, TX
March 1, 2021; 6:00 p.m., BSO		Texas Tech	W 88–79	11–10 (8–8)	Lloyd Noble Center (487); Norman, OK
March 4, 2021; 5:00 p.m., BSO		TCU	L 79–83	11–11 (8–9)	Lloyd Noble Center (423); Norman, OK
March 7, 2021; 3:00 p.m., BSO		Kansas State	W 90–81	12–11 (9–9)	Lloyd Noble Center (709); Norman, OK
Big 12 Women's Tournament
March 12, 2021; 8:30 p.m., ESPN+	(6)	vs. (3) Oklahoma State; First Round/Bedlam	L 80–89	12–12	Municipal Auditorium (765); Kansas City, Missouri
*Non-conference game. ^{#}Rankings from AP Poll. (#) Tournament seedings in parentheses. All times are in Central Time.

== Rankings ==
Regular season polls
Poll	Pre- season	Week 2	Week 3	Week 4	Week 5	Week 6	Week 7	Week 8	Week 9	Week 10	Week 11	Week 12	Week 13	Week 14	Week 15	Week 16	Final
AP																	
Coaches																	

Legend
	Increase in ranking
	Decrease in ranking
	Not ranked previous week
(RV)	Received votes
(NR)	Not ranked and did not receive votes

The Coaches Poll did not release a Week 2 poll, and the AP Poll did not release a poll after the NCAA Tournament.

== See also ==
- 2020–21 Oklahoma Sooners men's basketball team
