= 2021 Big 12 Conference women's basketball tournament =

- Classification: Division I
- Season: 2020–21
- Teams: 10
- Site: Municipal Auditorium; Kansas City, Missouri
- Champions: Baylor (11th title)
- Winning coach: Kim Mulkey (11th title)
- MVP: NaLyssa Smith (Baylor)
- Television: ESPN+, ESPN2

2020–21 Big 12 Conference women's basketball standings
| | Conf. | | | | Overall |
| Team | W | | L | PCT | W | | L | PCT |
|---|---|---|---|---|---|---|---|---|
| No. 5 Baylor† | 17 | – | 1 | .944 | 28 | – | 2 | .933 |
| No. 17 West Virginia | 13 | – | 5 | .722 | 22 | – | 7 | .759 |
| Oklahoma State | 13 | – | 5 | .722 | 19 | – | 9 | .679 |
| Iowa State | 12 | – | 6 | .667 | 17 | – | 11 | .607 |
| Texas | 11 | – | 7 | .611 | 20 | – | 9 | .690 |
| Oklahoma | 9 | – | 9 | .500 | 12 | – | 12 | .500 |
| Texas Tech | 5 | – | 13 | .278 | 10 | – | 15 | .400 |
| TCU | 4 | – | 14 | .222 | 10 | – | 15 | .400 |
| Kansas State | 3 | – | 15 | .167 | 9 | – | 18 | .333 |
| Kansas | 3 | – | 15 | .167 | 7 | – | 18 | .280 |
† 2021 Big 12 Tournament winner As of March 28, 2021; Rankings from AP poll

The 2021 Phillips 66 Big 12 Conference women's basketball tournament was a postseason tournament for the Big 12 Conference that was held March 11 to 14 in Kansas City, Missouri, at the Municipal Auditorium. Baylor won the tournament, its eleventh title.

== Seeds ==
2021 Big 12 Conference women's basketball tournament seeds and results
| Seed | School | Conf. | Over. | Tiebreaker |
| 1 | Baylor ‡# | 17–1 | 22–2 | |
| 2 | West Virginia # | 13–5 | 19–5 | 2–0 vs. Texas |
| 3 | Oklahoma State # | 13–5 | 17–7 | 1–1 vs. Texas |
| 4 | Iowa State # | 12–6 | 16–9 | |
| 5 | Texas # | 11–7 | 17–8 | |
| 6 | Oklahoma # | 9–9 | 12–11 | |
| 7 | Texas Tech | 5–13 | 10–14 | |
| 8 | TCU | 4–14 | 9–14 | |
| 9 | Kansas | 3–15 | 7–17 | 1–1 vs. OU |
| 10 | Kansas State | 3–15 | 8–17 | 0–2 vs. OU |
‡ – Big 12 Conference regular season champions, and tournament No. 1 seed. # - Received a single-bye in the conference tournament. Overall records include all games played in the Big 12 Conference tournament.

== Schedule ==
| Session | Game | Time | Matchup | Television | Attendance |
First round – Thursday, March 11
| 1 | 1 | 5:00 pm | No. 8 TCU 75 vs. No. 9 Kansas 72 | ESPN+ | 662 |
| 1 | 2 | 8:00 pm | No. 10 Kansas State 75 vs. No. 7 Texas Tech 65 | ESPN+ | 662 |
Quarterfinals – Friday, March 12
| 2 | 3 | 10:30 am | No. 4 Iowa State 82 vs. No. 5 Texas 84^{OT} | ESPN+ | 788 |
| 2 | 4 | 1:30 pm | No. 8 TCU 55 vs. No. 1 Baylor 92 | ESPN+ | 788 |
| 3 | 5 | 5:30 pm | No. 10 Kansas State 56 vs. No. 2 West Virginia 58 | ESPN+ | 765 |
| 3 | 6 | 8:30 pm | No. 6 Oklahoma 80 vs. No. 3 Oklahoma State 89 | ESPN+ | 765 |
Semifinals – Saturday, March 13
| 4 | 7 | Noon | No. 5 Texas 55 vs. No. 1 Baylor 66 | ESPN+ | 848 |
| 4 | 8 | 3:00 pm | No. 2 West Virginia 59 vs. No. 3 Oklahoma State 50 | ESPN+ | 848 |
Championship Game – Sunday, March 14
| 5 | 9 | Noon | No. 1 Baylor 76 vs. No. 2 West Virginia 50 | ESPN2 | 720 |
Game Times in CT. Rankings denote tournament seed.

== Bracket ==
First round Thursday, March 11
8 | TCU | 75
9 | Kansas | 72
7 | Texas Tech | 65
10 | Kansas State | 75

Quarterfinals; Friday, March 12
1 | Baylor | 92
8 | TCU | 55
4 | Iowa State | 82*
5 | Texas | 84
2 | West Virginia | 58
10 | Kansas State | 56
3 | Oklahoma State | 89
6 | Oklahoma | 80

Semifinals; Saturday, March 13
1 | Baylor | 66
5 | Texas | 55
2 | West Virginia | 59
3 | Oklahoma State | 50

Championship game Sunday, March 14
1 | Baylor | 76
2 | West Virginia | 50

*denotes overtime
