= 2020–21 Kansas Jayhawks women's basketball team =

Women's college basketball season

2020–21 Kansas Jayhawks women's basketball
- Conference: Big 12 Conference
- Record: 7–18 (3–15 Big 12)
- Head coach: Brandon Schneider (6th season)
- Assistant coach: Terry Nooner
- Home arena: Allen Fieldhouse

2020–21 Big 12 Conference women's basketball standings
	Conf.				Overall
Team	W		L	PCT	W		L	PCT
No. 5 Baylor†	17	–	1	.944	28	–	2	.933
No. 17 West Virginia	13	–	5	.722	22	–	7	.759
Oklahoma State	13	–	5	.722	19	–	9	.679
Iowa State	12	–	6	.667	17	–	11	.607
Texas	11	–	7	.611	20	–	9	.690
Oklahoma	9	–	9	.500	12	–	12	.500
Texas Tech	5	–	13	.278	10	–	15	.400
TCU	4	–	14	.222	10	–	15	.400
Kansas State	3	–	15	.167	9	–	18	.333
Kansas	3	–	15	.167	7	–	18	.280
† 2021 Big 12 Tournament winner As of March 28, 2021; Rankings from AP poll

The 2020–21 Kansas Jayhawks women's basketball team represented the University of Kansas in the 2020–21 NCAA Division I women's basketball season. The Jayhawks were led by sixth-year head coach Brandon Schneider. They played their home games at Allen Fieldhouse in Lawrence, Kansas as members of the Big 12 Conference.

They finished the season 7–18, 3–15 in Big 12 play to finish in a tie for ninth place. As the ninth seed in the Big 12 Tournament, they lost to TCU in the first round. They were not invited to the NCAA tournament or the WNIT.

== Previous season ==
The Jayhawks finished the season 15–14, 4–14 in Big 12 play to finish in last place. The Big 12 Tournament, NCAA women's basketball tournament and WNIT were all cancelled before they began, due to the COVID-19 pandemic.

== Roster ==
2020–21 Kansas Jayhawks women's basketball team
Players
Coaches

Pos.	#	Name	Height	Year	Previous school	Hometown
G	0	Erica Haynes-Overton	5 ft 5 in (1.65 m)	Sr	East Nashville Magnetl; East Tennessee State	Nashville, TN
F	1	Tina Stephens	6 ft 2 in (1.88 m)	Sr	Palmetto; Florida Southwestern State	Palmetto, FL
G	4	Mia Vuksic	5 ft 10 in (1.78 m)	Fr	ŽKK Šibenik	Šibenik, Croatia
G	5	Aniya Thomas	5 ft 7 in (1.7 m)	Jr	Duncanville	Duncanville, TX
C	10	Emma Merriweather	6 ft 5 in (1.96 m)	RS Jr	Lakeside; Texas Tech	Buena Park, CA
F	11	Ioanna Chatzileonti	6 ft 2 in (1.88 m)	Fr	Illioupolis GS	Athens, Greece
F	12	Katrine Jessen	6 ft 3 in (1.91 m)	Fr	Borupgaard Gymnasium	Skovlunde, Denmark
G	13	Holly Kersgieter	5 ft 10 in (1.78 m)	So	Charles Page	Sand Springs, OK
G	15	Zakiyah Franklin	5 ft 7 in (1.7 m)	So	Winter Haven	Lakeland, FL
G	20	Julie Brosseau	5 ft 9 in (1.75 m)	RS Sr	Collège Montmorency; Maine; Utah	Repentigny, QC
G	21	Brooklyn Mitchell	5 ft 6 in (1.68 m)	Jr	Ursuline Academy	New Orleans, LA
G	25	Chandler Prater	5 ft 11 in (1.8 m)	RS So	Kansas City	Kansas City, MO
C	31	Brittany Franklin	6 ft 5 in (1.96 m)	RS Jr	Plymouth	Plymouth, NC
C	35	Bailey Helgren	6 ft 5 in (1.96 m)	Sr	Edina	Edina, MN
C	45	Chisom Ajekwu	6 ft 3 in (1.91 m)	So	Lawrence	Lawrence, KS

Head coach

- Brandon Schneider (Wayland Baptist)

Assistant coach(es)

- Terry Nooner (Kansas)

Legend

- (C) Team captain
- (S) Suspended
- (I) Ineligible
- (W) Walk-on
- Injured
- Current redshirt

Roster
Last update: June 16, 2021

== Schedule and results ==
Date time, TV	Rank^{#}	Opponent^{#}	Result	Record	Site (attendance) city, state
Regular season
November 25, 2020*; 6:00 p.m., ESPN+		Northern Colorado	W 78–62	1–0	Allen Fieldhouse (0); Lawrence, KS
November 29, 2020*; 2:00 p.m., ESPN+		Texas A&M–Corpus Christi	W 85–43	2–0	Allen Fieldhouse (1); Lawrence, KS
December 3, 2020*; 7:30 p.m., SECN		at Ole Miss; Big 12/SEC Women's Challenge	L 53–70	2–1	The Pavilion at Ole Miss (840); Oxford, MS
December 6, 2020*; 2:00 p.m., ESPN+		Oral Roberts	W 100–59	3–1	Allen Fieldhouse (0); Lawrence, KS
December 10, 2020; 7:00 p.m., ESPN+		Oklahoma	W 74–64	4–1 (1–0)	Allen Fieldhouse (331); Lawrence, KS
December 21, 2020*; 1:00 p.m., ESPN+		North Dakota State	L 69–72	4–2	Allen Fieldhouse (456); Lawrence, KS
December 29, 2020*; Noon, ESPN+		New Mexico State	W 78–59	5–2	Allen Fieldhouse (348); Lawrence, KS
January 14, 2021; 7:00 p.m., LHN		at Texas	L 72–79	5–3 (1–1)	Frank Erwin Center (0); Austin, TX
January 17, 2021; 1:00 p.m., ESPN+		at TCU	L 78–81	5–4 (1–2)	Schollmaier Arena (914); Fort Worth, TX
January 20, 2021; 7:00 p.m., ESPN+		Texas Tech	L 65–74	5–5 (1–3)	Allen Fieldhouse (333); Lawrence, KS
January 23, 2021; 4:00 p.m., ESPN+		Kansas State; Sunflower Showdown	W 70–63	6–5 (2–3)	Allen Fieldhouse (538); Lawrence, KS
January 27, 2021; 7:00 p.m., ESPN+		at Oklahoma	L 81–84	6–6 (2–4)	Lloyd Noble Center (678); Norman, OK
January 30, 2021; 4:00 p.m., ESPN+		Oklahoma State	L 51–75	6–7 (2–5)	Allen Fieldhouse (0); Lawrence, KS
February 2, 2021; 6:30 p.m., ESPN+		at Oklahoma State	L 55–82	6–8 (2–6)	Gallagher-Iba Arena (1,621); Stillwater, OK
February 4, 2021; 7:00 p.m., ESPN+		at No. 8 Baylor	L 50–83	6–9 (2–7)	Ferrell Center (2,240); Waco, TX
February 7, 2021; 1:30 p.m., ESPN+		TCU	W 82–72	7–9 (3–7)	Allen Fieldhouse (352); Lawrence, KS
February 10, 2021; 6:00 p.m., ESPN+		at No. 19 West Virginia	L 61–69	7–10 (3–8)	WVU Coliseum (648); Morgantown, WV
February 13, 2021; 1:00 p.m., ESPN+		at Kansas State; Sunflower Showdown	L 66–77	7–11 (3–9)	Bramlage Coliseum (515); Manhattan, KS
February 17, 2021; 7:00 p.m., ESPN+		Iowa State	L 82–84	7–12 (3–10)	Allen Fieldhouse (388); Lawrence, KS
February 20, 2021; 3:00 p.m., ESPN+		at Texas Tech	L 98–99 ^{OT}	7–13 (3–11)	United Supermarkets Arena (2,310); Lubbock, TX
February 24, 2021; 7:00 p.m., ESPN+		Texas	L 52–61	7–14 (3–12)	Allen Fieldhouse (362); Lawrence, KS
February 27, 2021; 1:00 p.m., ESPN+		No. 18 West Virginia	L 68–72	7–15 (3–13)	Allen Fieldhouse (0); Lawrence, KS
March 3, 2021; 6:30 p.m., ESPN+		at Iowa State	L 53–83	7–16 (3–14)	Hilton Coliseum (699); Ames, IA
March 6, 2021; 4:00 p.m., ESPN+		No. 6 Baylor	L 67–93	7–17 (3–15)	Allen Fieldhouse (400); Lawrence, KS
Big 12 Tournament
March 11, 2021; 5:00 p.m., ESPN+	(9)	vs. (8) TCU; First Round	L 72–75	7–18	Municipal Auditorium (662); Kansas City, Missouri
*Non-conference game. ^{#}Rankings from AP Poll / Coaches' Poll. (#) Tournament seedings in parentheses. All times are in Central Time.

== Rankings ==
Regular season polls
Poll	Pre- season	Week 2	Week 3	Week 4	Week 5	Week 6	Week 7	Week 8	Week 9	Week 10	Week 11	Week 12	Week 13	Week 14	Week 15	Week 16	Final
AP																	
Coaches																	

Legend
	Increase in ranking
	Decrease in ranking
	Not ranked previous week
(RV)	Received votes
(NR)	Not ranked and did not receive votes

The Coaches Poll did not release a Week 2 poll, and the AP Poll did not release a poll after the NCAA Tournament.

== See also ==
- 2020–21 Kansas Jayhawks men's basketball team
