= 2020–21 Texas Longhorns women's basketball team =

Intercollegiate basketball season

2020–21 Texas Longhorns women's basketball

NCAA tournament, Elite Eight
- Conference: Big 12 Conference

Ranking
- Coaches: No. 17
- Record: 21–10 (11–7 Big 12)
- Head coach: Vic Schaefer (1st season)
- Associate head coach: Dionnah Jackson-Durrett (1st season)
- Assistant coaches: Johnnie Harris; Elena Lovato
- Home arena: Frank Erwin Center

2020–21 Big 12 Conference women's basketball standings
	Conf.				Overall
Team	W		L	PCT	W		L	PCT
No. 5 Baylor†	17	–	1	.944	28	–	2	.933
No. 17 West Virginia	13	–	5	.722	22	–	7	.759
Oklahoma State	13	–	5	.722	19	–	9	.679
Iowa State	12	–	6	.667	17	–	11	.607
Texas	11	–	7	.611	20	–	9	.690
Oklahoma	9	–	9	.500	12	–	12	.500
Texas Tech	5	–	13	.278	10	–	15	.400
TCU	4	–	14	.222	10	–	15	.400
Kansas State	3	–	15	.167	9	–	18	.333
Kansas	3	–	15	.167	7	–	18	.280
† 2021 Big 12 Tournament winner As of March 28, 2021; Rankings from AP poll

The 2020–21 Texas Longhorns women's basketball team represented the University of Texas at Austin in the 2020–21 NCAA Division I women's basketball season. It was head coach Vic Schaefer's first season at Texas after departing from Mississippi State. The Longhorns were members of the Big 12 Conference and played their home games at the Frank Erwin Center.

== Previous season ==
The Longhorns finished the 2019–20 season 19–11, 11–7 in Big 12 play, to finish in third place. Due to the COVID-19 pandemic, there was no post-season play.

== Offseason ==
=== Departures ===
Name	Number	Pos.	Height	Year	Hometown	Reason for departure
Sug Sutton	1	G	5'8"	Senior	St. Louis, MO	Graduated. Drafted in the 3rd round of the WNBA draft by the Washington Mystics.
Isabel Palmer	11	G	5'9"	Freshman	Newcastle, Australia	Transferred to Utah
Sophie Taylor	5	G	5'9"	Senior	Austin, TX	Graduated
Lashann Higgs	10	G	5'9"	Senior	Round Rock, TX	Graduated
Shae Routt	22	G/F	6'0"	Sophomore	Austin, TX	Departed from team
Joyner Holmes	24	F	6'3"	Senior	Cedar Hill, TX	Graduated. Drafted in the 2nd round of the WNBA draft by the Seattle Storm.

=== Recruits ===
College recruiting information
Name	Hometown	School	Height	Weight	Commit date
Ashley Chevalier; PG	Chatsworth, CA	Sierra Canyon High School	5 ft 7 in (1.70 m)	N/A	
Ashley Chevalier; PG	Recruit ratings: ESPN: (94)				
DeYona Gaston; F	Pearland, TX	Pearland High School	6 ft 2 in (1.88 m)	N/A	
DeYona Gaston; F	Recruit ratings: ESPN: (94)				
Shay Holle; G	Austin, TX	Westlake High School	6 ft 0 in (1.83 m)	N/A	
Shay Holle; G	Recruit ratings: ESPN: (92)				
Elyssa Coleman; P	Humble, TX	Atascocita High School	6 ft 2 in (1.88 m)	N/A	
Elyssa Coleman; P	Recruit ratings: ESPN: (90)				
Precious Johnson; P	Baytown, TX	Sterling High School	6 ft 5 in (1.96 m)	N/A	
Precious Johnson; P	Recruit ratings: ESPN: (89)				
Overall recruiting rankings:
Note: In many cases, Scout, Rivals, 247Sports and ESPN may conflict in their listings of height and weight.; In these cases, the average was taken. ESPN grades are on a 100-point scale.; Sources: "2018 Player Commits". ESPN.com.

== Roster ==
2020–21 Texas Longhorns women's basketball team
Players
Coaches

Pos.	#	Name	Height	Year	Previous school	Hometown
G	0	Celeste Taylor	5 ft 11 in (1.8 m)	So	Long Island Lutheran	Valley Stream, NY
F/C	1	Lauren Ebo	6 ft 4 in (1.93 m)	Jr	Riverdale Baptist	Washington, D.C.
G	3	Karisma Ortiz	6 ft 0 in (1.83 m)		Archbishop Mitty	San Jose, CA
G	10	Shay Holle	6 ft 0 in (1.83 m)	Fr	Westlake	Austin, TX
G	11	Joanne Allen-Taylor	5 ft 8 in (1.73 m)	Jr	Cypress Falls High School	Houston, TX
PG	15	Kyra Lambert	5 ft 9 in (1.75 m)	GS	Samuel Clemens	Cibolo, TX
F	20	Elyssa Coleman	6 ft 3 in (1.91 m)	Fr	Atascoctia School	Humble, TX
F	23	Deyona Gaston	6 ft 2 in (1.88 m)	Fr	Pearland	Pearland, TX
G	25	Ashley Chevalier	5 ft 7 in (1.7 m)	Fr	Sierra Canyon	Chatsworth, CA
G/F	35	Audrey Warren	5 ft 9 in (1.75 m)	Jr	Boswell	Fort Worth, TX
F/C	31	Charli Collier	6 ft 5 in (1.96 m)	Jr	Barbers Hill	Mont Belvieu, TX
F/C	51	Precious Johnson	6 ft 5 in (1.96 m)	RS Fr	Sterling	Baytown, TX

Head coach

- Vic Schaefer (Texas A&M)

Assistant coach(es)

- Dionnah Jackson-Durrett (Oklahoma)
- Johnnie Harris (Arkansas Baptist)
- Elena Lovato (Pittsburg State)

Legend

- (C) Team captain
- (S) Suspended
- (I) Ineligible
- (W) Walk-on
- Injured
- Current redshirt

Roster
Last update: September 23, 2024

== Schedule ==
Date time, TV	Rank^{#}	Opponent^{#}	Result	Record	Site city, state
Regular season
November 25, 2020*; 2:00 p.m., LHN		SMU	W 90–51	1–0	Frank Erwin Center (1,020); Austin, TX
November 29, 2020*; 3:00 p.m., LHN		North Texas	W 106–69	2–0	Frank Erwin Center (995); Austin, TX
December 2, 2020*; 8:00 p.m., LHN	No. 25	Louisiana Tech	W 84–57	3–0	Frank Erwin Center (958); Austin, TX
December 12, 2020*; 8:30 p.m., ESPN	No. 25	No. 12 Texas A&M	L 61–66	3–1	Frank Erwin Center (1,069); Austin, TX
December 9, 2018*; 2:00 p.m., LHN	No. 23	Idaho	W 73–48	4–1	Frank Erwin Center (958); Austin, TX
December 18, 2020*; 8:00 p.m., LHN	No. 22	Drake	W 101–80	5–1	Frank Erwin Center (1,002); Austin, TX
December 21, 2020; 8:00 p.m., LHN	No. 20	at Kansas State	W 62–52	6–1 (1–0)	Bramlage Coliseum (623); Manhattan, KS
December 29, 2020*; 5:00 p.m., LHN	No. 19	Lamar	W 77–49	7–1	Frank Erwin Center (0); Austin, TX
January 3, 2021; 3:00 p.m., ESPN2	No. 19	Iowa State	W 74–59	8–1 (2–0)	Frank Erwin Center (0); Austin, TX
Jan 9, 2021; 6:00 p.m., BIG12, ESPN+	No. 17	at West Virginia	L 58–92	8–2 (2–1)	WVU Coliseum (131); Morgantown, WV
January 14, 2021; 8:00 p.m., LHN	No. 21	Kansas	W 79–72	9–2 (3–1)	Frank Erwin Center (0); Austin, TX
January 17, 2021; 4:00 p.m., ESPN+	No. 21	at Texas Tech	L 66–74	9–3 (3–2)	United Supermarkets Arena (2,854); Lubbock, TX
January 20, 2021; 8:00 p.m., LHN		TCU	W 71–54	10–3 (4–2)	Frank Erwin Center (0); Austin, TX
January 23, 2021; 6:00 p.m., ESPNU		at No. 24 Iowa State	W 70–59	11–3 (5–2)	Hilton Coliseum (1,026); Ames, IA
January 27, 2021; 7:30 p.m., ESPN+		at Oklahoma State	L 51–68	11–4 (5–3)	Gallagher-Iba Arena (952); Stillwater, OK
January 30, 2021; 8:00 p.m., LHN		Texas Tech	W 72–53	12–4 (6–3)	Frank Erwin Center (0); Austin, TX
February 3, 2021; 8:00 p.m.		at Oklahoma	W 69–58	13–4 (7–3)	Lloyd Noble Center (717); Norman, OK
February 6, 2021; 8:00 p.m., LHN		West Virginia	L 75–81	13–5 (7–4)	Frank Erwin Center (997); Austin, TX
February 10, 2021; 8:00 p.m.		Oklahoma State	W 64–53	14–5 (8–4)	Frank Erwin Center (990); Austin, TX
February 14, 2021; 5:00 p.m., ESPN2		at No. 7 Baylor	L 35–60	14–6 (8–5)	Ferrell Center (2,350); Waco, TX
February 21, 2021; 3:00 p.m., LHN		Kansas State	W 59–48	15–6 (9–5)	Frank Erwin Center (0); Austin, TX
February 24, 2021; 8:00 p.m.		at Kansas	W 61–52	16–6 (10–5)	Allen Fieldhouse (362); Lawrence, KS
February 27, 2021; 1:00 p.m., LHN		Oklahoma	L 63–68 ^{OT}	16–7 (10–6)	Frank Erwin Center (978); Austin, TX
March 1, 2021; 6:00 p.m., ESPN2		No. 6 Baylor	L 57–64	16–8 (10–7)	Frank Erwin Center (1,028); Austin, TX
March 7, 2021; 1:00 p.m., ESPN+		at TCU	W 69–60	17–8 (11–7)	Schollmaier Arena (1,091); Fort Worth, TX
Big 12 women's tournament
March 12, 2021; 10:30 a.m., ESPNU	(5)	vs. (4) Iowa State; Quarterfinals	W 84–82 ^{OT}	18–8	Municipal Auditorium; Kansas City, MO
March 13, 2021; Noon, ESPN+	(5)	vs. (1) No. 6 Baylor; Semifinals	L 55–66	18–9	Municipal Auditorium; Kansas City, MO
NCAA women's tournament
March 22, 2021*; 8:00 p.m., ESPN2	(6)	vs. (11) Bradley; First round	W 81–62	19–9	Strahan Arena; San Marcos, TX
March 24, 2021*; 8:00 p.m., ESPN2	(6)	vs. (3) No. 9 UCLA; Second round	W 71–62	20–9	Alamodome; San Antonio, TX
March 28, 2021*; 8:00 p.m., ESPN	(6)	vs. (2) No. 7 Maryland; Sweet Sixteen	W 64–61	21–9	Alamodome; San Antonio, TX
March 30, 2021*; 6:00 p.m., ESPN	(6)	vs. (1) No. 6 South Carolina; Elite Eight	L 34–62	21–10	Alamodome; San Antonio, TX

== Rankings ==
Ranking movements Legend: ██ Increase in ranking ██ Decrease in ranking — = Not ranked
	Week																				
Poll	Pre	1	2	3	4	5	6	7	8	9	10	11	12	13	14	15	16	17	18	19	Final
AP	—	—^	25	23	22	20	19	17	21	—	—	—	—	—	—	—	—	—	—	—	—
Coaches	—	—^	—	—	22	19	19	17	20	24	23	—	—	—	—	—	—	—	—	—	17

^AP & Coaches did not release a Week 1 poll.

== 2020–21 media ==
=== Television and radio information ===
Most University of Texas home games were shown on the Longhorn Network, with national telecasts on the Big 12 Conference's television partners. On the radio, women's basketball games aired on KTXX-HD4 "105.3 The Bat", with select games on KTXX-FM 104.9.

== See also ==
- 2020–21 Texas Longhorns men's basketball team
