= 2020–21 Kansas State Wildcats women's basketball team =

Women's college basketball season

2020–21 Kansas State Wildcats women's basketball
- Conference: Big 12 Conference
- Record: 9–18 (3–15 Big 12)
- Head coach: Jeff Mittie (7th season)
- Assistant coaches: Brian Ostermann; Chris Carr; Ebony Haliburton
- Home arena: Bramlage Coliseum

2020–21 Big 12 Conference women's basketball standings
	Conf.				Overall
Team	W		L	PCT	W		L	PCT
No. 5 Baylor†	17	–	1	.944	28	–	2	.933
No. 17 West Virginia	13	–	5	.722	22	–	7	.759
Oklahoma State	13	–	5	.722	19	–	9	.679
Iowa State	12	–	6	.667	17	–	11	.607
Texas	11	–	7	.611	20	–	9	.690
Oklahoma	9	–	9	.500	12	–	12	.500
Texas Tech	5	–	13	.278	10	–	15	.400
TCU	4	–	14	.222	10	–	15	.400
Kansas State	3	–	15	.167	9	–	18	.333
Kansas	3	–	15	.167	7	–	18	.280
† 2021 Big 12 Tournament winner As of March 28, 2021; Rankings from AP poll

The 2020–21 Kansas State Wildcats women's basketball team represented Kansas State University in the 2020–21 NCAA Division I women's basketball season. The Wildcats were led by seventh-year head coach Jeff Mittie. They played their home games at Bramlage Coliseum in Manhattan, Kansas and were members of the Big 12 Conference.

They finished the season 9–18, 3–15 in Big 12 play to finish in a tie for ninth place. As the tenth seed in the Big 12 Tournament, they defeated Texas Tech in the first round before losing to West Virginia in the quarterfinals. They were not invited to the NCAA tournament or the WNIT.

== Previous season ==
The Wildcats finished the season 16–13, 10–8 in Big 12 play to finish in a tie for fourth place. They were scheduled to be the fifth seed in the Big 12 Tournament, but it was cancelled before it began, due to the COVID-19 pandemic. The NCAA women's basketball tournament and WNIT were also canceled.

== Roster ==
2020–21 Kansas State Wildcats women's basketball team
Players
Coaches

Pos.	#	Name	Height	Year	Previous school	Hometown
G	1	Savannah Simmons	6 ft 1 in (1.85 m)	Jr	The John Carroll School	Bel Air, MD
G	2	Cymone Goodrich	5 ft 10 in (1.78 m)	RS Jr	South Shore International Prep	Chicago, IL
G/F	3	Makayla Pippin	6 ft 1 in (1.85 m)	Jr	National Christian; Central Arizona	Indianapolis, IN
G	4	Sydney Goodson	5 ft 9 in (1.75 m)	Sr	Liberty Christian; Arizona State; Texas Tech	Argyle, TX
G	5	Alisa Wiggins	5 ft 8 in (1.73 m)	Jr	Montclair	Montclair, NJ
G	10	Jada Thorpe	5 ft 9 in (1.75 m)	RS Fr	Simeon Career Academy	Chicago, IL
G	12	Rachel Ranke	6 ft 1 in (1.85 m)	RS Jr	Eastview	Burnsville, MN
F	13	Laura Macke	6 ft 2 in (1.88 m)	So	Nemaha Central	Baileyville, KS
G	23	Jada Moore	5 ft 11 in (1.8 m)	Fr	Regis Jesuit	Denver, CO
G	24	Emilee Ebert	6 ft 0 in (1.83 m)	So	Frankfort	Frankfort, KS
C	33	Ashley Ray	6 ft 4 in (1.93 m)	Sr	Girard	Girard, KS
C	41	Taylor Lauterbach	6 ft 7 in (2.01 m)	Fr	Appleton West	Appleton, WI
G	43	Christianna Carr	6 ft 1 in (1.85 m)	Jr	Manhattan	Manhattan, KS
F	44	Emma Chapman	6 ft 3 in (1.91 m)	So	Hickman	Columbia, MO
C	50	Ayoka Lee	6 ft 6 in (1.98 m)	RS So	Byron	Byron, MN

Head coach

- Jeff Mittie (Missouri Western)

Assistant coach(es)

- Brian Ostermann (UW–La Crosse)
- Chris Carr (Southern Illinois)
- Ebony Haliburton (Oral Roberts)

Legend

- (C) Team captain
- (S) Suspended
- (I) Ineligible
- (W) Walk-on
- Injured
- Current redshirt

Roster
Last update: June 15, 2020

== Schedule and results ==
Date time, TV	Rank^{#}	Opponent^{#}	Result	Record	Site (attendance) city, state
Exhibition
November 25, 2020*; 1:00 p.m.		Fort Hays State	Canceled		Bramlage Coliseum; Manhattan, KS
November 27, 2020*; 6:00 p.m.		at Newman	W 63–59	–	Fugate Gymnasium (100); Wichita, KS
Non-conference regular season
November 29, 2020*; 1:00 p.m., ESPN+		Southern	W 66–51	1–0	Bramlage Coliseum (0); Manhattan, KS
December 3, 2020* :00 p.m., ESPN+		No. 11 Kentucky; Big 12/SEC Women's Challenge	L 49–60	1–1	Bramlage Coliseum (502); Manhattan, KS
December 5, 2020*; 2:00 p.m.		at Central Arkansas	W 47–33	2–1	Farris Center (100); Conway, AR
December 6, 2020*; Noon, ESPN+		UT Arlington	Canceled		Bramlage Coliseum; Manhattan, KS
December 8, 2020*; 1:00 p.m., ESPN+		Idaho State	L 50–65	2–2	Bramlage Coliseum (265); Manhattan, KS
December 10, 2020*; 6:30 p.m., ESPN+		No. 22 South Dakota State	W 62–53	3–2	Bramlage Coliseum (437); Manhattan, KS
December 12, 2020*; 1:00 p.m., ESPN+		Omaha	W 66–59	4–2	Bramlage Coliseum (491); Manhattan, KS
December 14, 2020*; 6:30 p.m., ESPN+		Kansas City	W 74–57	5–2	Bramlage Coliseum (506); Manhattan, KS
Big 12 regular season
December 18, 2020; 6:00 p.m., ESPN+		at Iowa State	L 69–91	5–3 (0–1)	Hilton Coliseum (802); Ames, IA
December 21, 2020; 7:00 p.m., ESPN+		Texas	L 52–62	5–4 (0–2)	Bramlage Coliseum (623); Manhattan, KS
January 2, 2021; 7:00 p.m.		at Oklahoma	Postponed		Lloyd Noble Center; Norman, OK
January 5, 2021; 6:30 p.m.		West Virginia	Postponed		Bramlage Coliseum; Manhattan, KS
January 10, 2021; 2:00 p.m.		at No. 6 Baylor	Postponed		Ferrell Center; Waco, TX
January 14, 2021; 6:30 p.m.		TCU	Postponed		Bramlage Coliseum; Manhattan, KS
January 17, 2021; 1:00 p.m.		Oklahoma State	Postponed		Bramlage Coliseum; Manhattan, KS
January 20, 2021; 6:00 p.m., ESPN+		at West Virginia	L 56–65	5–5 (0–3)	WVU Coliseum (113); Morgantown, WV
January 23, 2021; 4:00 p.m., ESPN+		at Kansas; Sunflower Showdown	L 63–70	5–6 (0–4)	Allen Fieldhouse (538); Lawrence, KS
January 25, 2021; 4:00 p.m., ESPN+		Oklahoma State	L 55–69	5–7 (0–5)	Bramlage Coliseum (283); Manhattan, KS
January 28, 2021; 6:30 p.m., ESPN+		Iowa State	L 60–62	5–8 (0–6)	Bramlage Coliseum (620); Manhattan, KS
January 31, 2021; 1:00 p.m., ESPN+		Oklahoma	L 78–80	5–9 (0–7)	Bramlage Coliseum (740); Manhattan, KS
February 3, 2021; 6:00 p.m., ESPN+		at Texas Tech	L 75–83 ^{OT}	5–10 (0–8)	United Supermarkets Arena (2,014); Lubbock, TX
February 7, 2021; 1:00 p.m., ESPN+		No. 8 Baylor	L 52–64	5–11 (0–9)	Bramlage Coliseum (323); Manhattan, KS
February 10, 2021; 6:30 p.m., ESPN+		at TCU	L 67–78	5–12 (0–10)	Schollmaier Arena (824); Fort Worth, TX
February 13, 2021; 1:00 p.m., ESPN+		Kansas; Sunflower Showdown	W 77–66	6–12 (1–10)	Bramlage Coliseum (515); Manhattan, KS
February 17, 2021; 3:00 p.m., ESPN+		at Oklahoma State	L 46–59	6–13 (1–11)	Gallagher-Iba Arena (505); Stillwater, OK
February 21, 2021; 2:00 p.m., LHN		at Texas	L 48–59	6–14 (1–12)	Frank Erwin Center (0); Austin, TX
February 24, 2021; 6:30 p.m., ESPN+		Texas Tech	W 86–79	7–14 (2–12)	Bramlage Coliseum (684); Manhattan, KS
February 27, 2021; 11:00 a.m., ESPN+		at No. 7 Baylor	L 49–85	7–15 (2–13)	Ferrell Center (2,203); Waco, TX
March 1, 2021; 6:30 p.m., ESPN+		TCU	W 79–76 ^{OT}	8–15 (3–13)	Bramlage Coliseum (503); Manhattan, KS
March 3, 2021; 6:30 p.m., ESPN+		No. 20 West Virginia	L 64–72	8–16 (3–14)	Bramlage Coliseum (603); Manhattan, KS
March 7, 2021; 3:00 p.m., BSO		at Oklahoma	L 81–90	8–17 (3–15)	Lloyd Noble Center (709); Norman, OK
Big 12 Women's Tournament
March 11, 2021; 8:00 p.m., ESPN+	(10)	vs. (7) Texas Tech; First Round	W 75–65	9–17	Municipal Auditorium (662); Kansas City, MO
March 12, 2021; 5:30 p.m., ESPN+	(10)	vs. (2) No. 17 West Virginia; Quarterfinals	L 56–58	9–18	Municipal Auditorium (765); Kansas City, MO
*Non-conference game. ^{#}Rankings from AP Poll / Coaches' Poll. (#) Tournament seedings in parentheses. All times are in Central Time.

== Rankings ==
+ Regular season polls	Poll	Pre- season	Week 2	Week 3	Week 4	Week 5	Week 6	Week 7	Week 8	Week 9	Week 10	Week 11	Week 12	Week 13	Week 14	Week 15	Week 16	Final
AP																		
Coaches																		

Legend
	Increase in ranking
	Decrease in ranking
	Not ranked previous week
(RV)	Received votes
(NR)	Not ranked and did not receive votes

The Coaches Poll did not release a Week 2 poll, and the AP Poll did not release a poll after the NCAA Tournament.

== See also ==
- 2020–21 Kansas State Wildcats men's basketball team
