= 2020–21 West Virginia Mountaineers women's basketball team =

Intercollegiate basketball season

2020–21 West Virginia Mountaineers women's basketball

South Point Thanksgiving Shootout Champions

NCAA tournament, second round
- Conference: Big 12 Conference

Ranking
- Coaches: No. 24
- AP: No. 17
- Record: 22–7 (13–5 Big 12)
- Head coach: Mike Carey (20th season)
- Assistant coaches: Bett Shelby; Craig Carey; Nitra Perry
- Home arena: WVU Coliseum

2020–21 Big 12 Conference women's basketball standings
	Conf.				Overall
Team	W		L	PCT	W		L	PCT
No. 5 Baylor†	17	–	1	.944	28	–	2	.933
No. 17 West Virginia	13	–	5	.722	22	–	7	.759
Oklahoma State	13	–	5	.722	19	–	9	.679
Iowa State	12	–	6	.667	17	–	11	.607
Texas	11	–	7	.611	20	–	9	.690
Oklahoma	9	–	9	.500	12	–	12	.500
Texas Tech	5	–	13	.278	10	–	15	.400
TCU	4	–	14	.222	10	–	15	.400
Kansas State	3	–	15	.167	9	–	18	.333
Kansas	3	–	15	.167	7	–	18	.280
† 2021 Big 12 Tournament winner As of March 28, 2021; Rankings from AP poll

The 2020–21 West Virginia Mountaineers women's basketball team represented West Virginia University during the 2020–21 NCAA Division I women's basketball season. The Mountaineers were coached by twentieth-year head coach Mike Carey, played their home games at WVU Coliseum and were members of the Big 12 Conference.

They finished the season 22–7, 13–5 in Big 12 play to finish in a tie for second place. As the second seed in the Big 12 Tournament, they defeated Kansas State and Oklahoma State before losing to Baylor in the Final. They received an at-large bid to the NCAA tournament. As the four seed in the HemisFair Regional they defeated Lehigh before losing to Georgia Tech in the Second Round to end their season.

== Previous season ==
The Mountaineers finished the season 17–12, 7–11 in Big 12 play to finish in a tie for sixth place. The Big 12 Tournament, NCAA women's basketball tournament and WNIT were all cancelled before they began due to the COVID-19 pandemic.

== Roster ==
2020–21 West Virginia Mountaineers women's basketball team
Players
Coaches

Pos.	#	Name	Height	Year	Previous school	Hometown
G	00	Jayla Hemingway	5 ft 11 in (1.8 m)	So	Houston; Mississippi State	Collierville, TN
G	2	Kysre Gondrezick	5 ft 9 in (1.75 m)	RS Sr	Benton Harbor; Michigan	Benton Harbor, MI
G	3	Kirsten Deans	5 ft 8 in (1.73 m)	So	Connections Academy	Greensboro, NC
G	5	Jasmine Carson	5 ft 10 in (1.78 m)	Jr	McEachern; Georgia Tech	Memphis, TN
F	12	Esmery Martínez	6 ft 2 in (1.88 m)	So	Hamilton Heights Christian	Hato Mayor del Rey, Dominican Republic
F	14	Kari Niblack	6 ft 1 in (1.85 m)	Jr	Wildwood	Leesburg, FL
C	22	Blessing Ejiofor	6 ft 5 in (1.96 m)	Sr	Paterson Eastside; Chipola CC	Ebonyi, Nigeria
G	30	Madisen Smith	5 ft 5 in (1.65 m)	Jr	Greenville Senior	Greenville, SC
C	33	Jeanna Cunningham	6 ft 4 in (1.93 m)	Fr	St. Francis Prep	Brentwood, NY

Head coach

- Mike Carey (Salem)

Assistant coach(es)

- Bett Shelby (Greensboro)
- Craig Carey (West Virginia)
- Nitra Perry (Mississippi State)

Legend

- (C) Team captain
- (S) Suspended
- (I) Ineligible
- (W) Walk-on
- Injured
- Current redshirt

Roster
Last update: June 1, 2021

== Schedule ==
Date time, TV	Rank^{#}	Opponent^{#}	Result	Record	Site (attendance) city, state
Regular season
November 27, 2020*; 1:00 p.m.		vs. Fresno State; South Point Thanksgiving Shootout	W 83–62	1–0	South Point Hotel, Casino & Spa (0); Enterprise, NV
November 28, 2020*; 5:45 p.m.		vs. LSU; South Point Thanksgiving Shootout	W 62–42	2–0	South Point Hotel, Casino & Spa (0); Enterprise, NV
December 3, 2020*; 7:00 p.m.		North Alabama	W 80–51	3–0	WVU Coliseum (138); Morgantown, WV
December 6, 2020*; 2:00 p.m.		Tennessee; Big 12/SEC Women's Challenge	W 79–73 ^{OT}	4–0	WVU Coliseum (142); Morgantown, WV
December 10, 2020; 6:00 p.m.		No. 7 Baylor	L 45–65	4–1 (0–1)	WVU Coliseum (121); Morgantown, WV
December 13, 2020*; 6:00 p.m.		James Madison	W 85–54	5–1	WVU Coliseum (117); Morgantown, WV
December 18, 2020; 6:30 p.m.		at Oklahoma State	L 73–78	5–2 (0–2)	Gallagher-Iba Arena (867); Stillwater, OK
December 21, 2020*; 2:00 p.m.		Ohio	W 88–79	6–2	WVU Coliseum (112); Morgantown, WV
December 22, 2020*		Coppin State	Canceled		WVU Coliseum; Morgantown, WV
January 2, 2021		at Kansas	Postponed		Allen Fieldhouse; Lawrence, KS
January 3, 2020; 2:00 p.m.		at Oklahoma	W 90–72	7–2 (1–2)	Lloyd Noble Center (417); Norman, OK
January 5, 2021		at Kansas State	Postponed		Bramlage Coliseum; Manhattan, KS
January 9, 2021; 6:00 p.m.		No. 17 Texas	W 92–58	8–2 (2–2)	WVU Coliseum (131); Morgantown, WV
January 13, 2021; 7:00 p.m.		Texas Tech	W 83–78	9–2 (3–2)	WVU Coliseum (107); Morgantown, WV
January 16, 2021; 2:00 p.m.		Oklahoma State	W 67–59	10–2 (4–2)	WVU Coliseum (109); Morgantown, WV
January 20, 2021; 7:00 p.m.		Kansas State	W 65–56	11–2 (5–2)	WVU Coliseum (113); Morgantown, WV
January 27, 2021; 6:00 p.m.	No. 24	at Texas Tech	W 73–53	12–2 (6–2)	United Supermarkets Arena (1,989); Lubbock, TX
January 30, 2021; 1:00 p.m.	No. 24	at TCU	W 79–70	13–2 (7–2)	Schollmaier Arena (904); Fort Worth, TX
February 3, 2021; 7:00 p.m.	No. 21	Iowa State	W 65–56	14–2 (8–2)	WVU Coliseum (514); Morgantown, WV
February 6, 2021; 7:00 p.m.	No. 21	at Texas	W 81–75	15–2 (9–2)	Frank Erwin Center (997); Austin, TX
February 10, 2021; 7:00 p.m.	No. 19	Kansas	W 69–61	16–2 (10–2)	WVU Coliseum (648); Morgantown, WV
February 13, 2021; 7:00 p.m.	No. 19	Oklahoma	L 71–72	16–3 (10–3)	WVU Coliseum (1,112); Morgantown, WV
February 17, 2021	No. 19	at No. 7 Baylor	Postponed		Ferrell Center; Waco, TX
February 20, 2021; 2:00 p.m.	No. 19	TCU	W 81–78	17–3 (11–3)	WVU Coliseum (1,236); Morgantown, WV
February 24, 2021; 6:30 p.m.	No. 18	at Iowa State	L 68–85	18–4 (11–4)	Hilton Coliseum (822); Ames, IA
February 27, 2021; 1:00 p.m.	No. 18	at Kansas	W 72–68	18–4 (12–4)	Allen Fieldhouse (0); Lawrence, KS
March 3, 2021; 6:30 p.m.	No. 20	at Kansas State	W 72–64	19–4 (13–4)	Bramlage Coliseum (603); Manhattan, KS
March 8, 2021; 7:00 p.m.	No. 17	at No. 6 Baylor	L 73–96	19–5 (13–5)	Ferrell Center (2,260); Waco, TX
Big 12 Women's Tournament
March 12, 2021; 6:30 p.m., ESPN+	(2) No. 17	vs. (10) Kansas State; Quarterfinals	W 58–56	20–5	Municipal Auditorium; Kansas City, MO
March 13, 2021; 4:00 p.m., ESPN+	(2) No. 17	vs. (3) Oklahoma State; Semifinals	W 59–50	21–5	Municipal Auditorium (848); Kansas City, Missouri
March 14, 2021; 1:00 p.m., ESPN2	(2) No. 17	vs. (1) No. 6 Baylor; Final	L 50–76	21–6	Municipal Auditorium (720); Kansas City, Missouri
NCAA tournament
March 21, 2021; 8:00 p.m.	(4 H) No. 17	vs. (13 H) Lehigh; First Round	W 77–53	22–6	Bill Greehey Arena; San Antonio, TX
March 23, 2021; 5:30 p.m., ESPNU	(4 H) No. 17	vs. Georgia Tech; Second Round	L 56–73	22–7	UTSA Convocation Center; San Antonio, TX
*Non-conference game. ^{#}Rankings from AP Poll. (#) Tournament seedings in parentheses. H=HemisFair. All times are in Eastern Time.

== Rankings ==
Ranking movements Legend: ██ Increase in ranking ██ Decrease in ranking — = Not ranked RV = Received votes т = Tied with team above or below
	Week																
Poll	Pre	1	2	3	4	5	6	7	8	9	10	11	12	13	14	15	Final
AP	—	—	RV	RV	—	—	—	RV	RV	24	21	19	19т	18	20	17	17
Coaches	—	RV	RV	RV	—	—	RV	RV	RV	24	21	24	22	23	20	20	24
