= 2020–21 South Carolina Gamecocks women's basketball team =

Intercollegiate basketball season

2020–21 South Carolina Gamecocks women's basketball

SEC tournament champions

NCAA tournament, Final Four
- Conference: Southeastern Conference

Ranking
- Coaches: No. 4
- AP: No. 6
- Record: 26–5 (14–2 SEC)
- Head coach: Dawn Staley (13th season)
- Assistant coaches: Lisa Boyer; Fred Chmiel; Jolette Law
- Home arena: Colonial Life Arena

2020–21 SEC women's basketball standings
	Conf.				Overall
Team	W		L	PCT	W		L	PCT
No. 4 Texas A&M	13	–	1	.929	25	–	3	.893
No. 6 South Carolina †	14	–	2	.875	26	–	5	.839
No. 13 Tennessee	9	–	4	.692	17	–	8	.680
No. 10 Georgia	10	–	5	.667	20	–	6	.769
No. 15 Arkansas	9	–	6	.600	19	–	8	.704
No. 18 Kentucky	9	–	6	.600	18	–	8	.692
Alabama	8	–	8	.500	16	–	9	.640
LSU	6	–	8	.429	9	–	13	.409
Mississippi State	5	–	7	.417	10	–	9	.526
Missouri	5	–	9	.357	9	–	13	.409
Ole Miss	4	–	10	.286	15	–	12	.556
Florida	3	–	11	.214	12	–	14	.462
Auburn	0	–	15	.000	5	–	19	.208
Vanderbilt^{%}	0	–	3	.000	4	–	4	.500
† 2021 SEC tournament winner % Vanderbilt suspended their season on January 18, 2021; As of March 21, 2021; Rankings from AP poll

The 2020–21 South Carolina Gamecocks women's basketball team represented the University of South Carolina during the 2020–21 NCAA Division I women's basketball season. The Gamecocks, led by thirteenth-year head coach Dawn Staley, played their home games at Colonial Life Arena and competed as members of the Southeastern Conference (SEC). They finished the season 26–5 (14–2 SEC), won the SEC tournament, and won a bid to the NCAA tournament where they advanced to the Final Four and lost to Stanford.

== Previous season ==
The Gamecocks finished the season with a 32–1 overall record and a 16–0 record in conference play. The Gamecocks won the SEC tournament. The Gamecocks therefore received an automatic bid to the 2020 NCAA Division I women's basketball tournament, however the tournament was not held due to the COVID-19 pandemic, and were de facto named mythical national championship by finishing first in the major wire service polls, the AP Poll and Coaches Poll. On December 31, 2020, during the Florida game, the program raised a banner to recognise the claim.

== Offseason ==
=== Departures ===
South Carolina Departures
Name	Number	Pos.	Height	Year	Hometown	Notes
Mikiah Herbert Harrigan	21	F	6'2"	Senior	Pembroke Pines, FL	Graduated; Drafted sixth overall by the Minnesota Lynx.
Tyasha Harris	52	G	5'10"	Senior	Noblesville, IN	Graduated; Drafted seventh overall by the Dallas Wings.

=== 2020 recruiting class ===
College recruiting information
Name	Hometown	School	Height	Weight	Commit date
Eniya Russell; PG	Baltimore, MD	St. Vincent Pallotti High School	6 ft 0 in (1.83 m)	N/A	
Eniya Russell; PG	Recruit ratings: ESPN: (96)				
Overall recruit ranking:
Note: In many cases, Scout, Rivals, 247Sports, On3, and ESPN may conflict in their listings of height and weight.; In these cases, the average was taken. ESPN grades are on a 100-point scale.; Sources:

== Preseason ==
=== SEC Media Poll ===
The SEC media poll was released on November 17, 2020 with the Gamecocks selected to finish in first place in the SEC.

SEC media poll
Predicted finish	Team
1	South Carolina
2	Kentucky
3	Texas A&M
4	Arkansas
5	Mississippi State
6	Tennessee
7	LSU
8	Alabama
9	Georgia
10	Missouri
11	Ole Miss
12	Florida
13	Vanderbilt
14	Auburn

=== Preseason All-SEC teams ===
The Gamecocks had two players selected to the preseason all-SEC teams.

First team

Aliyah Boston

Second team

Zia Cooke

== Roster ==
2020–21 South Carolina Gamecocks women's basketball team
Players
Coaches

Pos.	#	Name	Height	Year	Previous school	Hometown
G	0	Olivia Thompson	5 ft 8 in (1.73 m)	So	Lexington HS	Lexington, SC
G	1	Zia Cooke	5 ft 9 in (1.75 m)	So	Rogers HS	Toledo, OH
G	2	Eniya Russell	6 ft 1 in (1.85 m)	Fr	St. Vincent Pallotti HS	Baltimore, MD
G	3	Destanni Henderson	5 ft 7 in (1.7 m)	Jr	Fort Myers HS	Fort Myers, FL
F	4	Aliyah Boston	6 ft 4 in (1.93 m)	So	Worcester (Mass.) Academy	Saint Thomas, USVI
F	5	Victaria Saxton	6 ft 2 in (1.88 m)	Jr	Model	Rome, GA
G	11	Destiny Littleton	5 ft 9 in (1.75 m)	RS Jr	The Bishop's School; Texas	San Diego, CA
G	12	Brea Beal	6 ft 0 in (1.83 m)	So	Rock Island HS	Rock Island, IL
F	15	Laeticia Amihere	6 ft 3 in (1.91 m)	So	Kings Way Christian	Mississauga, ON
G	24	Lele Grissett	6 ft 2 in (1.88 m)	Sr	Hillside HS	Durham, NC
F	32	Elysa Wesolek	6 ft 1 in (1.85 m)	Jr	Northwood Academy	Charleston, SC

Head coach

- Dawn Staley (Virginia)

Assistant coach(es)

- Lisa Boyer (Ithaca)
- Fred Chmiel (Alaska–Anchorage)
- Jolette Law (Iowa)

Legend

- (C) Team captain
- (S) Suspended
- (I) Ineligible
- (W) Walk-on
- Injured
- Current redshirt

Roster

== Schedule ==
Date time, TV	Rank^{#}	Opponent^{#}	Result	Record	High points	High rebounds	High assists	Site (attendance) city, state
Regular season
November 25, 2020*; Noon, SECN+	No. 1	College of Charleston	W 119–38	1–0	19 – Saxton	12 – Tied	4 – Henderson	Colonial Life Arena (3,500); Columbia, SC
November 28, 2020*; 3:30 pm, FloHoops	No. 1	vs. South Dakota; Crossover Classic	W 81–71	2–0	19 – Tied	9 – Tied	4 – Boston	Sanford Pentagon; Sioux Falls, SD
November 29, 2020*; 3:30 pm	No. 1	vs. Oklahoma; Crossover Classic	Canceled due to COVID-19					Sanford Pentagon; Sioux Falls, SD
November 29, 2020*; 3:30 pm	No. 1	vs. No. 21 Gonzaga; Crossover Classic	W 79–72	3–0	23 – Henderson	7 – Beal	4 – Cooke	Sanford Pentagon; Sioux Falls, SD
December 3, 2020*; 7:00 pm, ESPN2	No. 1	No. 8 NC State; Jimmy V Classic	L 46–54	3–1	11 – Tied	15 – Amihere	6 – Henderson	Colonial Life Arena (3,500); Columbia, SC
December 6, 2020*; 12:00 pm, ESPNU	No. 1	at No. 23 Iowa State; Big 12/SEC Women's Challenge	W 83–65	4–1	19 – Cooke	15 – Boston	7 – Henderson	Hilton Coliseum (864); Ames, IA
December 17, 2020*; 8:00 pm	No. 5	Temple	W 103–41	5–1	23 – Cooke	9 – Boston	7 – Henderson	Colonial Life Arena; Columbia, SC
December 31, 2021	No. 5	Florida	W 75–59	6–1 (1–0)	28 – Boston	16 – Boston	5 – Henderson	Colonial Life Arena; Columbia, SC
January 4, 2021; 5:00 pm	No. 5	at Alabama	W 77–60	7–1 (2–0)	20 – Henderson	10 – Tied	5 – Henderson	Coleman Coliseum; Tuscaloosa, AL
January 10, 2021	No. 5	at No. 10 Kentucky	W 75–70	8–1 (3–0)	22 – Henderson	12 – Boston	3 – Henderson	Memorial Coliseum; Lexington, KY
January 14, 2021; 8:00 pm	No. 5	at Vanderbilt	W 106–43	9–1 (4–0)	20 – Saxton	12 – Grissett	9 – Henderson	Memorial Gymnasium; Nashville, TN
January 18, 2021; 7:00 pm, ESPN2	No. 4	No. 17 Arkansas	W 104–82	10–1 (5–0)	26 – Boston	16 – Boston	10 – Henderson	Colonial Life Arena; Columbia, SC
January 21, 2021; 6:30 pm, SECN	No. 4	No. 22 Georgia	W 62–50	11–1 (6–0)	16 – Tied	11 – Tied	3 – Henderson	Colonial Life Arena; Columbia, SC
January 24, 2021; 1:00 pm, SECN	No. 4	at LSU	W 69–65	12–1 (7–0)	20 – Boston	14 – Boston	8 – Henderson	Pete Maravich Assembly Center; Baton Rouge, LA
January 28, 2021; 7:00 pm, ESPN	No. 4	at No. 21 Mississippi State	W 75–52	13–1 (8–0)	19 – Cooke	12 – Boston	3 – Cooke	Humphrey Coliseum; Starkville, MS
January 31, 2021; 3:00 pm, SECN	No. 4	Alabama	W 87–63	14–1 (9–0)	21 – Cooke	13 – Boston	6 – Henderson	Colonial Life Arena; Columbia, SC
February 4, 2021; 7:00 pm, SECN+	No. 2	at Auburn	W 77–58	15–1 (10–0)	17 – Cooke	9 – Amihere	9 – Henderson	Auburn Arena; Auburn, AL
February 8, 2021*; 7:00 pm, FS1	No. 1	at No. 2 UConn	L 59–63 ^{OT}	15–2	17 – Boston	15 – Boston	3 – Tied	Harry A. Gampel Pavilion; Storrs, CT
February 11, 2021; 7:00 pm, SECN	No. 1	Missouri	W 77–62	16–2 (11–0)	15 – Cooke	12 – Boston	3 – Tied	Colonial Life Arena; Columbia, SC
February 14, 2021; Noon, SECN	No. 1	LSU	W 66–59	17–2 (12–0)	19 – Henderson	13 – Boston	4 – Cooke	Colonial Life Arena (3,500); Columbia, SC
February 18, 2021; 7:00 pm, SECN	No. 2	at No. 21 Tennessee	L 67–75	17–3 (12–1)	17 – Boston	16 – Boston	6 – Henderson	Thompson–Boling Arena (2,512); Knoxville, TN
February 21, 2021; 3:00 pm, ESPN	No. 2	No. 17 Kentucky	W 76–55	18–3 (13–1)	21 – Cooke	13 – Amihere	3 – Boston	Colonial Life Arena; Columbia, SC
February 25, 2021; 1:00 pm, SECN	No. 5	Ole Miss	W 68–43	19–3 (14–1)	17 – Cooke	11 – Boston	4 – Henderson	Colonial Life Arena; Columbia, SC
February 28, 2021; 2:00 pm, ESPN2	No. 5	at No. 3 Texas A&M	L 57–65	19–4 (14–2)	15 – Tied	11 – Boston	6 – Henderson	Reed Arena; College Station, TX
SEC Tournament
March 5, 2021; 5:00 pm, SECN	(2) No. 7	vs. (7) Alabama; Quarterfinals	W 75–63	20–4	22 – Cooke	13 – Boston	5 – Henderson	Bon Secours Wellness Arena; Greenville, SC
March 6, 2021; 8:30 pm, ESPNU	(2) No. 7	vs. (3) No. 13 Tennessee; Semifinals	W 67–52	21–4	22 – Cooke	13 – Boston	5 – Henderson	Bon Secours Wellness Arena (2,662); Greenville, SC
March 7, 2021; 2:00 pm, ESPN2	(2) No. 7	vs. (4) No. 16 Georgia; Championship	W 67–62	22–4	27 – Boston	10 – Boston	3 – Henderson	Bon Secours Wellness Arena; Greenville, SC
NCAA tournament
March 21, 2021*; 6:00 pm, ESPN	(1 H) No. 6	vs. (16 H) Mercer; First Round	W 79–53	23–4	20 – Tied	18 – Boston	4 – Henderson	Alamodome; San Antonio, TX
March 23, 2021*; 7:00 pm, ESPN	(1 H) No. 6	vs. (8 H) Oregon State; Second Round	W 59–42	24–4	19 – Boston	11 – Beal	2 – Tied	Alamodome; San Antonio, TX
March 27, 2021*; 1:00 pm, ABC	(1 H) No. 6	vs. (5 H) Georgia Tech; Sweet Sixteen	W 76–65	25–4	17 – Cooke	7 – Amihere	7 – Henderson	Alamodome; San Antonio, TX
March 30, 2021*; 7:00 pm, ESPN	(1 H) No. 6	vs. (6 H) Texas; Elite Eight	W 62–34	26–4	16 – Cooke	8 – Tied	7 – Henderson	Alamodome; San Antonio, TX
April 2, 2021*; 6:00 pm, ESPN	(1 H) No. 6	vs. (1 A) No. 2 Stanford; Final Four	L 65–66	26–5	25 – Cooke	16 – Boston	3 – Henderson	Alamodome; San Antonio, TX
*Non-conference game. ^{#}Rankings from AP Poll. (#) Tournament seedings in parentheses. H=HemisFair A=Alamo. All times are in Eastern Time.

== See also ==
- 2020–21 South Carolina Gamecocks men's basketball team
