= 2020–21 Texas Tech Lady Raiders basketball team =

Women's college basketball season

2020–21 Texas Tech Lady Raiders basketball
- Conference: Big 12 Conference
- Record: 10–15 (5–13 Big 12)
- Head coach: Krista Gerlich (1st season)
- Assistant coaches: JC Carter; Ashley Crawford; Eric Ely
- Home arena: United Supermarkets Arena

2020–21 Big 12 Conference women's basketball standings
	Conf.				Overall
Team	W		L	PCT	W		L	PCT
No. 5 Baylor†	17	–	1	.944	28	–	2	.933
No. 17 West Virginia	13	–	5	.722	22	–	7	.759
Oklahoma State	13	–	5	.722	19	–	9	.679
Iowa State	12	–	6	.667	17	–	11	.607
Texas	11	–	7	.611	20	–	9	.690
Oklahoma	9	–	9	.500	12	–	12	.500
Texas Tech	5	–	13	.278	10	–	15	.400
TCU	4	–	14	.222	10	–	15	.400
Kansas State	3	–	15	.167	9	–	18	.333
Kansas	3	–	15	.167	7	–	18	.280
† 2021 Big 12 Tournament winner As of March 28, 2021; Rankings from AP poll

The 2020–21 Texas Tech Lady Raiders basketball team represented Texas Tech University in the 2020–21 NCAA Division I women's basketball season. The Lady Raiders were led by first-year head coach Krista Gerlich. They played their homes games at United Supermarkets Arena and were members of the Big 12 Conference.

The team finished the season 10–15, 5–13 in Big 12 play to finish in seventh place. In the Big 12 Tournament, they lost to Kansas State in the first round. They were not invited to the NCAA tournament or the WNIT.

Prior to the season, Marlene Stollings was fired after two years as head coach. USA Today revealed in a story published on August 5, 2020, that 12 players had left Texas Tech since Stollings became head coach in 2018, over accusations that she and her staff were verbally abusive and subjected players to dangerous forms of conditioning, such as a requirement for players to have a 90% capacity heart rate in practice and games. The day after the story was published, Texas Tech fired Stollings for cause. Shortly thereafter, Krista Gerlich was hired as the new head coach.

== Previous season ==
The Lady Raiders finished the season 18–11, 7–11 in Big 12 play to finish tied for sixth place. They were scheduled to be the seventh seed in the Big 12 Tournament, but it was cancelled before it began, due to the COVID-19 pandemic. The NCAA women's basketball tournament and WNIT were also canceled.

== Roster ==
2020–21 Texas Tech Lady Raiders women's basketball team
Players
Coaches

Pos.	#	Name	Height	Year	Previous school	Hometown
G	3	Maka Jackson	5 ft 8 in (1.73 m)	Sr	Stonewall Jackson; South Georgia Technical College	ʻEwa Beach, HI
G	4	Ashyln Caddel	5 ft 7 in (1.7 m)	Fr	Frenship	Wolfforth, TX
G	5	Jo'nah Johnson	5 ft 9 in (1.75 m)	Sr	Edmond Santa Fe; Northeastern Oklahoma A&M College	Edmond, OK
G	10	Najé Murray	5 ft 6 in (1.68 m)	RS Jr	Saint Mary's; San Diego State	Stockton, CA
G	12	Vivian Gray	6 ft 1 in (1.85 m)	Sr	Argyle; Fort Lewis; Oklahoma State	Argyle, TX
G	14	Jada Walton	5 ft 11 in (1.8 m)	RS Jr	Southwest DeKalb; Texas A&M	Lithonia, GA
F	20	Bryn Gerlich	6 ft 0 in (1.83 m)	Jr	Colleyville Heritage; Oklahoma State	Colleyville, TX
C	23	Khadija Faye	6 ft 4 in (1.93 m)	Fr	Father Lopez Catholic	Dakar, Senegal
F	25	Daija Powell	6 ft 1 in (1.85 m)	Fr	Sandy Creek	Atlanta, GA
F	33	Khyla Wade-Warren	6 ft 2 in (1.88 m)	Fr	McNairy Central	Selmer, TN
G	34	Lexi Gordon	6 ft 0 in (1.83 m)	Sr	L. D. Bell; UConn	Fort Worth, TX
G	35	Alexis Tucker	5 ft 11 in (1.8 m)	So	Junípero Serra	Hawthrone, CA

Head coach

- Krista Gerlich (Texas Tech)

Assistant coach(es)

- JC Carter (Southwest Baptist)
- Ashley Crawford (Lamar)
- Eric Ely (Northwest Nazarene)

Legend

- (C) Team captain
- (S) Suspended
- (I) Ineligible
- (W) Walk-on
- Injured
- Current redshirt

Roster

== Schedule ==
Date time, TV	Rank^{#}	Opponent^{#}	Result	Record	Site (attendance) city, state
Regular season
November 25, 2020*; 1:00 p.m., ESPN+		UTRGV	W 89–56	1–0	United Supermarkets Arena (2,523); Lubbock, TX
November 28, 2020*; 2:00 p.m., ESPN+		Houston Baptist	W 68–51	2–0	United Supermarkets Arena (2,701); Lubbock, TX
December 2, 2020*; 7:00 p.m., SECN+		at Vanderbilt; Big 12/SEC Women's Challenge	Canceled		Memorial Gymnasium; Nashville, TN
December 5, 2020*; 6:00 p.m., ESPN+		Rice	L 62–81	2–1	United Supermarkets Arena (2,714); Lubbock, TX
December 9, 2020*; Noon, ESPN+		Angelo State	W 87–42	3–1	United Supermarkets Arena (1,762); Lubbock, TX
December 10, 2020*; Noon		Missouri	Canceled		United Supermarkets Arena; Lubbock, TX
December 14, 2020; 6:00 p.m., ESPNU		at No. 7 Baylor	L 45–91	3–2 (0–1)	Ferrell Center (2,105); Waco, TX
December 19, 2020; 2:00 p.m., ESPN+		TCU	W 78–72	4–2 (1–1)	United Supermarkets Arena (2,612); Lubbock, TX
December 21, 2020*; 1:00 p.m., ESPN+		Southern	W 79–60	5–2	United Supermarkets Arena (2,610); Lubbock, TX
December 23, 2020*; 1:00 p.m.		Morgan State	Canceled		United Supermarkets Arena; Lubbock, TX
December 29, 2020*; 1:00 p.m., ESPN+		Incarnate Word	W 100–47	6–2	United Supermarkets Arena (2,620); Lubbock, TX
January 2, 2021; 6:30 p.m., ESPN+		at Oklahoma State	L 48–75	6–3 (1–2)	Gallagher-Iba Arena (1,219); Stillwater, OK
January 6, 2021; 6:00 p.m., ESPN+		Oklahoma	L 74–75	6–4 (1–3)	United Supermarkets Arena (2,493); Lubbock, TX
January 10, 2021; 3:00 p.m., ESPNU		Iowa State	L 72–99	6–5 (1–4)	United Supermarkets Arena (2,000); Lubbock, TX
January 13, 2021; 6:00 p.m., ESPN+		at West Virginia	L 78–83	6–6 (1–5)	WVU Coliseum (107); Morgantown, WV
January 17, 2021; 3:00 p.m., ESPN+		Texas	W 74–66	7–6 (2–5)	United Supermarkets Arena (2,854); Lubbock, TX
January 20, 2021; 7:00 p.m.		at Kansas	W 75–65	8–6 (3–5)	Allen Fieldhouse (333); Lawrence, KS
January 23, 2021; 1:00 p.m., ESPN+		at TCU	L 53–61	8–7 (3–6)	Schollmaier Arena (1,165); Fort Worth, TX
January 27, 2021; 6:00 p.m., ESPN+		West Virginia	L 53–73	8–8 (3–7)	United Supermarkets Arena (1,989); Lubbock, TX
January 30, 2021; 7:00 p.m., LHN		at Texas	L 53–72	8–9 (3–8)	Frank Erwin Center (0); Austin, TX
February 3, 2021; 6:00 p.m., ESPN+		Kansas State	W 83–75 ^{OT}	9–9 (4–8)	United Supermarkets Arena (2,014); Lubbock, TX
February 6, 2021; 2:00 p.m., ESPN+		at Iowa State	L 73–92	9–10 (4–9)	Hilton Coliseum (789); Ames, IA
February 10, 2021; 6:00 p.m., ESPN+		No. 7 Baylor	L 50–82	9–11 (4–10)	United Supermarkets Arena (2,086); Lubbock, TX
February 13, 2021; 3:00 p.m., ESPN+		Oklahoma State	L 66–81	9–12 (4–11)	United Supermarkets Arena (2,256); Lubbock, TX
February 20, 2021; 3:00 p.m., ESPN+		Kansas	W 99–98 ^{OT}	10–12 (5–11)	United Supermarkets Arena (2,310); Lubbock, TX
February 24, 2021; 6:30 p.m., ESPN+		at Kansas State	L 79–86	10–13 (5–12)	Bramlage Coliseum (684); Manhattan, KS
March 1, 2021; 6:00 p.m., BSO		at Oklahoma	L 79–88	10–14 (5–13)	Lloyd Noble Center (487); Norman, OK
Big 12 Women's Tournament
March 11, 2021; 8:00 p.m., ESPN+	(7)	vs. (10) Kansas State; First Round	L 65–75	10–15	Municipal Auditorium (662); Kansas City, Missouri
*Non-conference game. ^{#}Rankings from AP Poll. (#) Tournament seedings in parentheses. All times are in Central Time.

== Rankings ==
Regular season polls
Poll	Pre- season	Week 2	Week 3	Week 4	Week 5	Week 6	Week 7	Week 8	Week 9	Week 10	Week 11	Week 12	Week 13	Week 14	Week 15	Week 16	Final
AP																	
Coaches																	

Legend
	Increase in ranking
	Decrease in ranking
	Not ranked previous week
(RV)	Received votes
(NR)	Not ranked and did not receive votes

The Coaches Poll did not release a Week 2 poll, and the AP Poll did not release a poll after the NCAA Tournament.

== See also ==
- 2020–21 Texas Tech Red Raiders basketball team
