= 2020–21 Oklahoma State Cowgirls basketball team =

Women's college basketball season

2020–21 Oklahoma State Cowgirls basketball

NCAA tournament, second round
- Conference: Big 12 Conference
- Record: 19–9 (13–5 Big 12)
- Head coach: Jim Littell (10th season)
- Assistant coaches: Bill Annan; Ashley Davis; Jerise Freeman
- Home arena: Gallagher-Iba Arena

2020–21 Big 12 Conference women's basketball standings
	Conf.				Overall
Team	W		L	PCT	W		L	PCT
No. 5 Baylor†	17	–	1	.944	28	–	2	.933
No. 17 West Virginia	13	–	5	.722	22	–	7	.759
Oklahoma State	13	–	5	.722	19	–	9	.679
Iowa State	12	–	6	.667	17	–	11	.607
Texas	11	–	7	.611	20	–	9	.690
Oklahoma	9	–	9	.500	12	–	12	.500
Texas Tech	5	–	13	.278	10	–	15	.400
TCU	4	–	14	.222	10	–	15	.400
Kansas State	3	–	15	.167	9	–	18	.333
Kansas	3	–	15	.167	7	–	18	.280
† 2021 Big 12 Tournament winner As of March 28, 2021; Rankings from AP poll

The 2020–21 Oklahoma State Cowgirls basketball team represented Oklahoma State University in the 2020–21 NCAA Division I women's basketball season. The Cowgirls, led by tenth-year head coach Jim Littell, played their home games at Gallagher-Iba Arena and were members of the Big 12 Conference.

They finished the season 19–9, 13–5 in Big 12 play to finish in a tie for second place. As the third seed in the Big 12 Tournament, they defeated Oklahoma in the quarterfinals before losing to West Virginia in the semifinals. They received an at-large bid to the NCAA women's basketball tournament. As the eight seed in the Alamo Regional, they defeated Wake Forest in the first round before losing to eventual champions Stanford in the second round.

== Previous season ==
The Cowgirls finished the season 15–15, 6–12 in Big 12 play to finish in eighth place. The Big 12 Tournament, NCAA women's basketball tournament and WNIT were all cancelled before they began, due to the COVID-19 pandemic.

== Roster ==
2020–21 Oklahoma State Cowgirls women's basketball team
Players
Coaches

Pos.	#	Name	Height	Year	Previous school	Hometown
C	1	Kassidy De Lapp	6 ft 3 in (1.91 m)	Jr	Oak Ridge	El Dorado Hills, CA
G	2	Neferatali Notoa	5 ft 11 in (1.8 m)	Fr	Brisbane State	Brisbane, Australia
G	3	Micah Dennis	5 ft 9 in (1.75 m)	So	Cairine Wilson	Toronto, Canada
F	4	Natasha Mack	6 ft 4 in (1.93 m)	Sr	Lufkin; Angelina College	Lufkin, TX
F	11	Bigue Sarr	6 ft 3 in (1.91 m)	Sr	Malick Sy; South Georgia Technical College	Dakar, Senegal
F	14	Taylen Collins	6 ft 1 in (1.85 m)	Fr	Muldrow	Muldrow, OK
G	15	Lexy Keys	5 ft 7 in (1.7 m)	Fr	Tahlequah-Sequoyah	Tahlequah, OK
G	21	Ja'Mee Asberry	5 ft 5 in (1.65 m)	RS Jr	East Central	Tulsa, OK
F	22	Ruthie Udoumoh	6 ft 0 in (1.83 m)	Fr	Victory Christian	Broken Arrow, OK
G	23	Lauren Fields	5 ft 9 in (1.75 m)	RS So	Shawnee	Shawnee, OK
F	24	Kennedi Jackson	6 ft 3 in (1.91 m)	RS Fr	Ursuline	New Orleans, LA
F	25	Abbie Winchester	6 ft 1 in (1.85 m)	Sr	Heritage Hall	Oklahoma City, OK
G	30	Sara Rodrigues	6 ft 3 in (1.91 m)	So	Colégio Integrado de Guarulhos	São Paulo, Brazil
F	35	Brittany Reeves	6 ft 5 in (1.96 m)	Jr	Howard; Independence CC	Macon, GA

Head coach

- Jim Littell (Southwestern (KS))

Assistant coach(es)

- Bill Annan (Kansas State)
- Ashley Davis (TCU)
- Jerise Freeman (Pacific)

Legend

- (C) Team captain
- (S) Suspended
- (I) Ineligible
- (W) Walk-on
- Injured
- Current redshirt

Roster
Last update: June 3, 2021

== Schedule and results ==
Date time, TV	Rank^{#}	Opponent^{#}	Result	Record	Site (attendance) city, state
Regular season
November 25, 2020*; 2:00 p.m.		at Little Rock	Canceled		Jack Stephens Center; Little Rock, AR
November 29, 200*; 2:00 p.m.		Oral Roberts	W 73–54	1–0	Gallagher-Iba Arena (905); Stillwater, OK
December 2, 2020*; 6:30 p.m.		Southern	W 68–34	2–0	Gallagher-Iba Arena (813); Stillwater, OK
December 5, 2020*; 2:30 p.m., ESPN+		Alabama; Big 12/SEC Women's Challenge	L 72–76	2–1	Gallagher-Iba Arena (898); Stillwater, OK
December 7, 2020*; 6:30 p.m., ESPN+		SMU	W 75–63	3–1	Gallagher-Iba Arena (758); Stillwater, OK
December 13, 2020*; 2:00 p.m., ESPN+		Tulsa	L 62–69	3–2	Gallagher-Iba Arena (652); Stillwater, OK
December 15, 2020; 7:00 p.m., FSOK		at Oklahoma; Bedlam	W 66–53	4–2 (1–0)	Lloyd Noble Center (676); Norman, OK
December 18, 2020; 6:30 p.m., ESPN+		West Virginia	W 78–73	5–2 (2–0)	Gallagher-Iba Arena (867); Stillwater, OK
December 22, 2020*; 5:00 p.m.		at North Texas	W 82–68	6–2	UNT Coliseum (961); Denton, TX
January 2, 2021; 6:30 p.m., ESPN+		Texas Tech	W 75–48	7–2 (3–0)	Gallagher-Iba Arena (1,219); Stillwater, OK
January 6, 2021; 6:30 p.m., ESPN+		at TCU	W 78–53	8–2 (4–0)	Schollmaier Arena (760); Fort Worth, TX
January 9, 2021; 2:00 p.m., ESPN+		TCU	W 69–50	9–2 (5–0)	Gallagher-Iba Arena (1,059); Stillwater, OK
January 13, 2021; 6:30 p.m., ESPN+		at No. 24 Iowa State	L 80–90	9–3 (5–1)	Hilton Coliseum (724); Ames, IA
January 16, 2021; 1:00 p.m., ESPN+		at West Virginia	L 59–67	9–4 (5–2)	WVU Coliseum (109); Morgantown, WV
January 20, 2021; 6:30 p.m., ESPN+		No. 9 Baylor	L 58–77	9–5 (5–3)	Gallagher-Iba Arena (1,123); Stillwater, OK
January 25, 2021; 4:00 p.m., ESPN+		at Kansas State	W 69–55	10–5 (6–3)	Bramlage Coliseum (283); Manhattan, KS
January 27, 2021; 6:30 p.m., ESPN+		Texas	W 68–51	11–5 (7–3)	Gallagher-Iba Arena (952); Stillwater, OK
January 30, 2021; 4:00 p.m., ESPN+		at Kansas	W 75–51	12–5 (8–3)	Allen Fieldhouse (0); Lawrence, KS
February 2, 2021; 6:30 p.m., ESPN+		Kansas	W 82–55	13–5 (9–3)	Gallagher-Iba Arena (1,621); Stillwater, OK
February 6, 2021; 7:00 p.m., ESPN+		Oklahoma; Bedlam	W 91–67	14–5 (10–3)	Gallagher-Iba Arena (2,219); Stillwater, OK
February 10, 2021; 7:00 p.m., LHN		at Texas	L 53–64	14–6 (10–4)	Frank Erwin Center (990); Austin, TX
February 13, 2021; 3:00 p.m., ESPN+		at Texas Tech	W 81–66	15–6 (11–4)	United Supermarkets Arena (2,256); Lubbock, TX
February 17, 2021; 3:00 p.m., ESPN+		Kansas State	W 59–46	16–6 (12–4)	Gallagher-Iba Arena (505); Stillwater, OK
February 20, 2021; 1:00 p.m., ESPN+		Iowa State	W 80–73	17–6 (13–4)	Gallagher-Iba Arena (1,235); Stillwater, OK
February 24, 2021; 7:00 p.m., ESPN+		at No. 7 Baylor	L 51–70	17–7 (13–5)	Ferrell Center (2,119); Waco, TX
Big 12 Women's Tournament
March 12, 2021; 8:30 p.m., ESPN+	(3)	vs. (6) Oklahoma; Quarterfinals/Bedlam	W 89–80	18–7	Municipal Auditorium (765); Kansas City, MO
March 13, 2021; 3:00 p.m., ESPN+	(3)	vs. (2) No. 17 West Virginia; Semifinals	L 50–59	18–8	Municipal Auditorium (848); Kansas City, MO
NCAA tournament
March 21, 2021; Noon, ESPN2	(8 A)	vs. (9 A) Wake Forest; First Round	W 84–61	19–8	Bill Greehey Arena (0); San Antonio, TX
March 23, 2021; 8:00 p.m., ESPN2	(8 A)	vs. (1 A) No. 2 Stanford; Second Round	L 62–73	19–9	UTSA Convocation Center (0); San Antonio, TX
*Non-conference game. ^{#}Rankings from AP Poll. (#) Tournament seedings in parentheses. A=Alamo. All times are in Central Time.

== Rankings ==
Regular season polls
Poll	Pre- season	Week 2	Week 3	Week 4	Week 5	Week 6	Week 7	Week 8	Week 9	Week 10	Week 11	Week 12	Week 13	Week 14	Week 15	Week 16	Final
AP											RV	RV	RV	RV	RV	RV	RV
Coaches										RV	RV	RV	RV	RV	RV	RV	RV

Legend
	Increase in ranking
	Decrease in ranking
	Not ranked previous week
(RV)	Received votes
(NR)	Not ranked and did not receive votes

The Coaches Poll did not release a Week 2 poll, and the AP Poll did not release a poll after the NCAA Tournament.

== See also ==
- 2020–21 Oklahoma State Cowboys basketball team
