= 2020–21 Baylor Lady Bears basketball team =

Intercollegiate basketball season

2020–21 Baylor Lady Bears basketball

Big 12 regular season and tournament champions

NCAA tournament, Elite Eight
- Conference: Big 12 Conference

Ranking
- Coaches: No. 6
- AP: No. 6
- Record: 28–3 (16–1 Big 12)
- Head coach: Kim Mulkey (20th season)
- Associate head coach: Bill Brock (18th season)
- Assistant coaches: Sytia Messer (8th season); Kaylin Rice (2nd season)
- Home arena: Ferrell Center

2020–21 Big 12 Conference women's basketball standings
	Conf.				Overall
Team	W		L	PCT	W		L	PCT
No. 5 Baylor†	17	–	1	.944	28	–	2	.933
No. 17 West Virginia	13	–	5	.722	22	–	7	.759
Oklahoma State	13	–	5	.722	19	–	9	.679
Iowa State	12	–	6	.667	17	–	11	.607
Texas	11	–	7	.611	20	–	9	.690
Oklahoma	9	–	9	.500	12	–	12	.500
Texas Tech	5	–	13	.278	10	–	15	.400
TCU	4	–	14	.222	10	–	15	.400
Kansas State	3	–	15	.167	9	–	18	.333
Kansas	3	–	15	.167	7	–	18	.280
† 2021 Big 12 Tournament winner As of March 28, 2021; Rankings from AP poll

The 2020–21 Baylor Lady Bears basketball team represented Baylor University in the 2020–21 NCAA Division I women's basketball season. The team played its home games at the Ferrell Center in Waco, Texas and were members of the Big 12 Conference. They were led by Hall of Fame coach Kim Mulkey in her 20th and final season with the Bears. On April 26, 2021, Mulkey was introduced as head coach of the LSU Tigers.

This was the final season in which Baylor women's basketball used the "Lady Bears" nickname. On September 3, 2021, Baylor announced that the last three women's teams that were still using "Lady Bears", namely basketball, soccer, and volleyball, would be known simply as "Bears" from that point forward.

== Previous season ==
The Lady Bears finished the 2018–19 season with a record of 28–2, 17–1 in Big 12 to win the Big 12 regular season title. They qualified for the Big 12 women's tournament, which, along with the NCAA women's tournament, was canceled due to the COVID-19 pandemic.

== Offseason ==
=== Departures ===
Name	Number	Pos.	Height	Year	Hometown	Reason for departure
Te'a Cooper	4	G	5'8"	Senior	Powder Springs, GA	Completed college eligibility (Note: Cooper was a graduate transfer in the 2019–20 season, having graduated from South Carolina.)
Lauren Cox	15	F	6'4"	Senior	Flower Mound, TX	Graduated
Juicy Landrum	20	G	5'9"	Senior	Waco, TX	Graduated
Erin DeGrate	22	F	6'6"	Senior	Waco, TX	Graduated

== Roster ==
2020–21 Baylor Bears women's basketball team
Players
Coaches

Pos.	#	Name	Height	Year	Previous school	Hometown
F	1	NaLyssa Smith	6 ft 2 in (1.88 m)	Jr	East Central HS	Converse, TX
G	2	DiDi Richards	6 ft 1 in (1.85 m)	Sr	Cypress Ranch HS	Cypress, TX
G	3	Trinity Oliver	5 ft 9 in (1.75 m)	RS Jr	Trinity HS	Euless, TX
G	10	Jaden Owens	5 ft 8 in (1.73 m)	So	UCLA	Plano, TX
F	11	Jordyn Oliver	5 ft 10 in (1.78 m)	So	Prosper HS	Prosper, TX
G	12	Moon Ursin	5 ft 6 in (1.68 m)	Sr	Destrehan HS	Destrehan, LA
C	20	Hannah Gusters	6 ft 5 in (1.96 m)	Fr	MacArthur HS	Dallas, TX
G	21	DiJonai Carrington	5 ft 11 in (1.8 m)	Sr	Stanford	San Diego, CA
G	22	Kamaria McDaniel	5 ft 10 in (1.78 m)	Sr	Penn State	Inkster, MI
G	24	Sarah Andrews	5 ft 6 in (1.68 m)	Fr	MacArthur HS	Irving, TX
C	25	Queen Egbo	6 ft 3 in (1.91 m)	Jr	Travis HS	Houston, TX
F	51	Caitlin Bickle	6 ft 0 in (1.83 m)	Jr	Cactus Shadows HS	Cave Creek, AZ

Head coach

- Kim Mulkey (Louisiana Tech)

Assistant coach(es)

- Bill Brock (SE Oklahoma State)
- Sytia Messer (Arkansas)
- Kaylin Rice (Baylor)

Legend

- (C) Team captain
- (S) Suspended
- (I) Ineligible
- (W) Walk-on
- Injured
- Current redshirt

Roster

== Schedule ==
Date time, TV	Rank^{#}	Opponent^{#}	Result	Record	High points	High rebounds	High assists	Site (attendance) city, state
Regular Season
November 25, 2020*; 7:00 p.m., ESPN+	No. 4	Central Arkansas	W 82–37	1–0	25 – Smith	15 – Smith	6 – Andrews	Ferrell Center (2,121); Waco, Texas
December 1*; 6:00 p.m., ESPN+	No. 4	at South Florida	W 67–62	2–0	25 – Egbo	11 – Egbo	7 – Richards	Yuengling Center; Tampa, Florida
December 6*; 5:00 p.m., ESPN2	No. 4	at No. 16 Arkansas; Big 12/SEC Women's Challenge	L 78–83	2–1	24 – Carrington	7 – Tied	8 – Richards	Bud Walton Arena (2,633); Fayetteville, Arkansas
December 10; 6:00 p.m., ESPN+	No. 7	at West Virginia	W 65–45	3–1 (1–0)	19 – Carrington	8 – Ursin	5 – Ursin	WVU Coliseum (121); Morgantown, West Virginia
December 14; 6:00 p.m., ESPNU	No. 7	Texas Tech	W 91–45	4–1 (2–0)	21 – Smith	9 – Smith	8 – Oliver	Ferrell Center (2,105); Waco, Texas
December 16*; 2:00 p.m., ESPN+	No. 7	Southern	W 86–52	5–1	16 – Smith	11 – Egbo	6 – Richards	Ferrell Center; Waco, Texas
December 18*; 2:00 p.m., ESPN+	No. 7	Northwestern State	W 136–43	6–1	30 – Smith	11 – Bickle	7 – Ursin	Ferrell Center (2,048); Waco, Texas
December 19*; 2:00 p.m., ESPN+	No. 7	McNeese State	W 117–24	7–1	17 – Gusters	11 – Tied	8 – Owens	Ferrell Center; Waco, Texas
January 2, 2021	No. 7	TCU	W 74-50	8–1 (3–0)	21 – Ursin	12 – Smith	7 – Tied	Schollmaier Arena; Fort Worth, Texas
January 7*	No. 6	No. 3 UConn	Cancelled due to the COVID-19 pandemic					Ferrell Center; Waco, Texas
January 16; 7:00 pm, ESPN2	No. 6	Iowa State	L 71–75	8–2 (3–1)	15 – Owens	12 – Smith	10 – Richards	Ferrell Center (2,247); Waco, Texas
January 20; 6:30 pm, ESPN+	No. 9	at Oklahoma State	W 77–58	9–2 (4–1)	20 – Ursin	12 – Smith	7 – Richards	Gallagher-Iba Arena (1,123); Stillwater, Oklahoma
January 23; 7:00 pm, ESPN+	No. 9	Oklahoma	W 84–61	10–2 (5–1)	21 – Smith	11 – Ursin	12 – Richards	Ferrell Center (2,274); Waco, Texas
January 26; 7:00 pm, ESPN+	No. 9	TCU	W 82–49	11–2 (6–1)	21 – Ursin	16 – Smith	6 – Richards	Ferrell Center (2,261); Waco, Texas
January 31; 3:00 pm, ESPN2	No. 9	at Iowa State	W 85–77	12–2 (7–1)	20 – Smith	15 – Ursin	6 – Ursin	Hilton Coliseum (1,129); Ames, Iowa
February 3; 7:00 pm, ESPN+	No. 8	Kansas	W 83–50	13–2 (8–1)	17 – Smith	11 – Egbo	7 – Richards	Ferrell Center (2,240); Waco, Texas
February 7; 1:00 pm, ESPN+	No. 8	at Kansas State	W 64–52	14–2 (9–1)	17 – Smith	8 – Smith	10 – Richards	Bramlage Coliseum (323); Manhattan, Kansas
February 10; 6:00 pm, ESPN+	No. 7	at Texas Tech	W 82–50	15–2 (10–1)	28 – Smith	13 – Smith	6 – Richards	United Supermarkets Arena (2,086); Lubbock, Texas
February 14; 4:00 pm, ESPN2	No. 7	Texas	W 60–35	16–2 (11–1)	14 – Smith	12 – Ursin	10 – Richards	Ferrell Center (2,350); Waco, Texas
February 20; 1:00 pm	No. 7	at Oklahoma	W 77–66	17–2 (12–1)	19 – Carrington	6 – Richards	5 – Richards	Lloyd Noble Center (637); Norman, Oklahoma
February 14*; 7:00 pm, ESPN+	No. 7	Oklahoma State	W 70–51	18–2 (13–1)	20 – Smith	11 – Carrington	11 – Richards	Ferrell Center (2,119); Waco, Texas
February 27; 2,203, ESPN+	No. 7	Kansas State; Reschedulded from January 10	W 85–49	19–2 (14–1)	19 – Egbo	5 – Ursin	8 – Ursin	Ferrell Center (2,203); Waco, Texas
March 1*; 6:00 pm, ESPN2	No. 6	Texas	W 64–57	20–2 (15–1)	23 – Smith	14 – Egbo	5 – Ursin	Frank Erwin Center (1,028); Austin, Texas
March 6; 4:00 pm, ESPN+	No. 6	at Kansas; Rescheduled from January 13	W 93–67	21–2 (16–1)	21 – Smith	12 – Smith	4 – Ursin	Allen Fieldhouse (400); Lawrence, Kansas
March 8; 7:00 pm, ESPN+	No. 6	No. 17 West Virginia; Rescheduled from February 17	W 96–73	22–2 (17–1)	26 – Egbo	10 – Egbo	9 – Richards	Ferrell Center; Waco, Texas
Big 12 Women's Tournament
March 12; 1:30 pm, FSN	(1) No. 6	vs. (8) TCU; Quarterfinals	W 92–55	23–2	26 – Smith	12 – Egbo	6 – Tied	Municipal Auditorium; Kansas City, MO
March 13; Noon, ESPN+	(1) No. 6	vs. (4) Texas; Semifinals	W 66–55	24–2	21 – Smith	18 – Egbo	2 – Tied	Municipal Auditorium; Kansas City, MO
March 14; Noon, ESPN2	(1) No. 6	vs. (2) No. 17 West Virginia; Finals	W 76–50	25–2	18 – Egbo	11 – Egbo	2 – Richards	Municipal Auditorium; Kansas City, MO
NCAA tournament
March 21; 3:00 p.m., ABC	(2 RW) No. 5	vs. (15 RW) Jackson State; First Round	W 101–52	26–2	24 – Ursin	10 – Smith	4 – Richards	Alamodome; San Antonio, TX
March 23; 6:00 p.m., ESPN2	(2 RW) No. 5	vs. (7 RW) Virginia Tech; Second Round	W 90–48	27–2	21 – Tied	13 – Egbo	9 – Richards	Bill Greehey Arena; San Antonio, TX
March 27; 2:00 p.m., ABC	(2 RW) No. 5	vs. (6 RW) No. 16 Michigan; Sweet Sixteen	W 78–75 ^{OT}	28–2	24 – Smith	8 – Egbo	9 – Richards	Alamodome; San Antonio, TX
March 29; 6:00 p.m., ESPN	(2 RW) No. 5	vs. (1 RW) No. 1 UConn; Elite Eight	L 67–69	28–3	14 – Smith	13 – Smith	3 – 2 tied	Alamodome; San Antonio, TX
*Non-conference game. ^{#}Rankings from AP Poll. (#) Tournament seedings in parentheses. All times are in Central Time.

== Rankings ==
Ranking movements Legend: ██ Increase in ranking ██ Decrease in ranking
	Week																	
Poll	Pre	1	2	3	4	5	6	7	8	9	10	11	12	13	14	15	16	Final
AP	4	4	4	7	7⊤	7	7	6	6	9	9	8	7	7	7	6	6	5
Coaches	4	4	4	7	7	6	6	6	6	9	8	8	9	8	7	6	6	5

== See also ==
- 2020–21 Big 12 Conference women's basketball season
- 2020–21 NCAA Division I women's basketball season
- 2020–21 Baylor Bears basketball team - men's team
