= 2020–21 Iowa State Cyclones women's basketball team =

Intercollegiate basketball season

2020–21 Iowa State Cyclones women's basketball

NCAA tournament, second round
- Conference: Big 12 Conference
- Record: 17–11 (12–6 Big 12)
- Head coach: Bill Fennelly (26th season)
- Assistant coaches: Jodi Steyer; Latoja Schaben; Billy Fennelly
- Home arena: Hilton Coliseum

2020–21 Big 12 Conference women's basketball standings
	Conf.				Overall
Team	W		L	PCT	W		L	PCT
No. 5 Baylor†	17	–	1	.944	28	–	2	.933
No. 17 West Virginia	13	–	5	.722	22	–	7	.759
Oklahoma State	13	–	5	.722	19	–	9	.679
Iowa State	12	–	6	.667	17	–	11	.607
Texas	11	–	7	.611	20	–	9	.690
Oklahoma	9	–	9	.500	12	–	12	.500
Texas Tech	5	–	13	.278	10	–	15	.400
TCU	4	–	14	.222	10	–	15	.400
Kansas State	3	–	15	.167	9	–	18	.333
Kansas	3	–	15	.167	7	–	18	.280
† 2021 Big 12 Tournament winner As of March 28, 2021; Rankings from AP poll

The 2020–21 Iowa State Cyclones women's basketball team represented Iowa State University during the 2020–21 NCAA Division I women's basketball season. The Cyclones were coached by Bill Fennelly, who was in his 26th season at Iowa State. They played their home games at Hilton Coliseum in Ames, Iowa as members of the Big 12 Conference.

== Previous season ==
The Cyclones finished the 2019–20 season 18–11, 10–8 in Big 12 play to finish in tie for fourth place. The Big 12 Tournament, NCAA women's basketball tournament and WNIT were all cancelled before they began due to the COVID-19 pandemic.

== Roster ==
2020–21 Iowa State Cyclones women's basketball team
Players
Coaches

Pos.	#	Name	Height	Year	Previous school	Hometown
F	1	Madison Wise	6 ft 1 in (1.85 m)	Sr	Greenfield-Central	Greenfield, IN
G	4	Rae Johnson	5 ft 7 in (1.7 m)	Sr	St. Michael-Albertville	Albertville, MN
G	10	Kylie Feuerbach	6 ft 0 in (1.83 m)	Fr	Sycamore	Sycamore, IL
G	11	Emily Ryan	5 ft 11 in (1.8 m)	Fr	Central Plains	Claflin, KS
G	13	Maggie Espenmiller-McGraw	5 ft 10 in (1.78 m)	So	Southeast Polk	Indianola, IA
F	15	Izzi Zingaro	6 ft 4 in (1.93 m)	Fr	Caledon Academy	Bolton, Canada
G	20	Aubrey Joens	5 ft 11 in (1.8 m)	Fr	Iowa City	Iowa City, IA
G	21	Lexi Donarski	6 ft 0 in (1.83 m)	Fr	Aquinas	La Crosse, WI
G	23	Maddie Frederick	6 ft 0 in (1.83 m)	RS So	Tippecanoe	Tipp, OH
G	24	Ashley Joens	6 ft 0 in (1.83 m)	Jr	Iowa City	Iowa City, IA
C	25	Kristan Scott	6 ft 3 in (1.91 m)	Sr	Kasson-Mantorville	Kasson, MN
F	31	Morgan Kane	6 ft 3 in (1.91 m)	RS So	Riverton	West Jordan, UT

Head coach

- Bill Fennelly (William Penn)

Assistant coach(es)

- Jodi Steyer (Colorado State)
- Latoja Schaben (Toledo)
- Billy Fennelly (Iowa State)

Legend

- (C) Team captain
- (S) Suspended
- (I) Ineligible
- (W) Walk-on
- Injured
- Current redshirt

Roster
Last update: March 19, 2021

== Schedule and results ==
Date time, TV	Rank^{#}	Opponent^{#}	Result	Record	Site (attendance) city, state
Regular Season
November 25, 2020*; Noon, ESPN+	No. 15	Omaha	W 69–43	1–0	Hilton Coliseum (0); Ames, IA
November 28, 2020*; 2:00 p.m., ESPN3	No. 15	at South Dakota State	L 69–76	1–1	Frost Arena (678); Brookings, SD
December 2, 2020; 6:30 p.m., ESPN+	No. 23	at TCU	W 91–68	2–1 (1–0)	Schollmaier Arena (715); Fort Worth, TX
December 6, 2020*; 11:00 a.m., ESPNU	No. 23	No. 1 South Carolina; Big 12/SEC Women's Challenge	L 65–83	2–2	Hilton Coliseum (864); Ames, IA
December 9, 2020*; 6:30 p.m., BTN+		at Iowa; Iowa Corn Cy-Hawk Series	L 80–82	2–3	Carver–Hawkeye Arena (326); Iowa City, IA
December 12, 2020*; Noon, ESPN+		North Dakota State	W 85–64	3–3	Hilton Coliseum (579); Ames, IA
December 15, 2020*; 6:30 p.m., ESPN+		at UNI	W 67–61	4–3	McLeod Center (250); Cedar Falls, IA
December 18, 2020; 6:00 p.m., ESPN+		Kansas State	W 91–69	5–3 (2–0)	Hilton Coliseum (802); Ames, IA
December 22, 2020; 6:00 p.m., ESPN+		Drake	W 85–67	6–3	Hilton Coliseum (884); Ames, IA
January 3, 2021; 2:00 p.m., ESPN2		at No. 19 Texas	L 59–74	6–4 (2–1)	Frank Erwin Center (0); Austin, TX
January 6, 2021; TBD		Kansas	Postponed		Hilton Coliseum; Ames, IA
January 10, 2021; 3:00 p.m., ESPNU		at Texas Tech	W 99–72	7–4 (3–1)	United Supermarkets Arena (2,000); Lubbock, TX
January 13, 2021; 6:30 p.m., ESPN+		Oklahoma State	W 90–80	8–4 (4–1)	Hilton Coliseum (724); Ames, IA
January 16, 2021; 7:00 p.m., ESPN2		at No. 6 Baylor	W 75–71	9–4 (5–1)	Ferrell Center (2,247); Waco, TX
January 19, 2021; 6:30 p.m., ESPN+	No. 24	Oklahoma	W 64–63	10–4 (6–1)	Hilton Coliseum (695); Ames, IA
January 23, 2021; 5:00 p.m., ESPN2	No. 24	Texas	L 59–70	10–5 (6–2)	Hilton Coliseum (1,026); Ames, IA
January 28, 2021; 6:30 p.m., ESPN+		at Kansas State	W 62–60	11–5 (7–2)	Bramlage Coliseum (0); Manhattan, KS
January 31, 2021; 3:00 p.m., ESPN2		No. 9 Baylor	L 77–85	11–6 (7–3)	Hilton Coliseum (1,129); Ames, IA
February 3, 2021; 6:00 p.m., ESPN+		at No. 21 West Virginia	L 56–65	11–7 (7–4)	WVU Coliseum (514); Morgantown, WV
February 6, 2021; 2:00 p.m.		Texas Tech	W 92–73	12–7 (8–4)	Hilton Coliseum (789); Ames, IA
February 9, 2021; 7:00 p.m., FSOK		at Oklahoma	L 61–67	12–8 (8–5)	Lloyd Noble Center (678); Norman, OK
February 13, 2021; 7:00 p.m., ESPN+		TCU	W 92–81	13–8 (9–5)	Hilton Coliseum (762); Ames, IA
February 17, 2021; 7:00 p.m., ESPN+		at Kansas	W 84–82	14–8 (10–5)	Allen Fieldhouse (388); Lawrence, KS
February 20, 2021; 1:00 p.m., ESPN+		at Oklahoma State	L 73–80	14–9 (10–6)	Gallagher-Iba Arena (1,235); Stillwater, OK
February 24, 2021; 6:30 p.m., ESPN+		No. 18 West Virginia	W 85–68	15–9 (11–6)	Hilton Coliseum (822); Ames, IA
March 3, 2021; 6:30 p.m., ESPN+		Kansas	W 83–53	16–9 (12–6)	Hilton Coliseum (699); Ames, IA
Big 12 Tournament
March 12, 2021; 10:30 p.m., ESPN+	(4)	vs. (5) Texas; Quarterfinals	L 82–84 ^{OT}	16–10	Municipal Auditorium (0); Kansas City, MO
NCAA Women's Tournament
March 22, 2021*; 5:00 pm, ESPN	(7 M)	vs. (10 M) Michigan State; First Round	W 79–75	17–10	Alamodome; San Antonio, TX
March 24, 2021*; 6:00 pm, ESPN2	(7 M)	vs. (2 M) No. 4 Texas A&M; Second Round	L 82–84 ^{OT}	17–11	Alamodome; San Antonio, TX
*Non-conference game. ^{#}Rankings from AP Poll. (#) Tournament seedings in parentheses. M=Mercado. All times are in Central Time.

== Rankings ==
Ranking movement Legend: ██ Increase in ranking. ██ Decrease in ranking. ██ Not ranked previous week. NR = Not ranked. RV = Received votes.
Poll	Pre	Wk 2	Wk 3	Wk 4	Wk 5	Wk 6	Wk 7	Wk 8	Wk 9	Wk 10	Wk 11	Wk 12	Wk 13	Wk 14	Wk 15	Wk 16	Final
AP	15	23	RV	RV	RV	RV	RV		24	RV	RV	RV					
Coaches	18	24	RV					RV	RV	RV							

Coaches' Poll did not release a second poll at the same time as the AP.

== See also ==
2020–21 Iowa State Cyclones men's basketball team
