= 2021–22 Fairfield Stags women's basketball team =

American college basketball season

2021–22 Fairfield Stags women's basketball
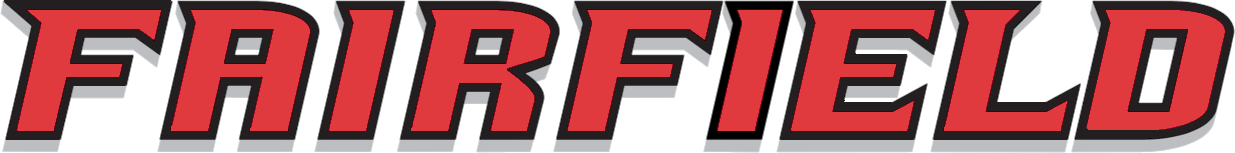

MAAC regular-season & tournament champions

NCAA tournament, first round
- Conference: Metro Atlantic Athletic Conference
- Record: 25–7 (19–1 MAAC)
- Head coach: Joe Frager (15th season)
- Associate head coach: Laura Scinto
- Assistant coaches: David Jollon; Isoken Uzamere
- Home arena: Webster Bank Arena

2021–22 MAAC women's basketball standings
	Conf.				Overall
Team	W		L	PCT	W		L	PCT
Fairfield †	19	–	1	.950	25	–	7	.781
Quinnipiac	14	–	6	.700	21	–	12	.636
Manhattan	14	–	6	.700	21	–	11	.656
Niagara	11	–	9	.550	15	–	15	.500
Siena	10	–	10	.500	10	–	19	.345
Monmouth	9	–	11	.450	14	–	16	.467
Saint Peter's	9	–	11	.450	13	–	18	.419
Iona	8	–	12	.400	11	–	16	.407
Rider	7	–	13	.350	9	–	21	.300
Marist	6	–	14	.300	8	–	21	.276
Canisius	3	–	17	.150	6	–	25	.194
† 2022 MAAC tournament winner

The 2021–22 Fairfield Stags women's basketball team represented Fairfield University in the 2021–22 NCAA Division I women's basketball season. The Stags, led by fifteenth-year head coach Joe Frager, played their home games at Webster Bank Arena in Bridgeport, Connecticut as members of the Metro Atlantic Athletic Conference (MAAC). They finished the season 25–7, 19–1 in MAAC play, to win the MAAC regular-season and tournament titles. They received an automatic bid to the NCAA women's basketball tournament where they lost to Texas in the first round.

Frager announced on October 19, 2021, that he would retire at the end of the season, his 15th as Fairfield head coach. He finished with a record of 265–191 in 15 seasons.

== Roster ==
2021–22 Fairfield Stags women's basketball team
Players
Coaches

Pos.	#	Name	Height	Year	Previous school	Hometown
G	1	Anna Eng	5 ft 5 in (1.65 m)	Fr	Croton-Harmon	Croton, NY
G	2	Mimi Rubino	5 ft 7 in (1.7 m)	So	Morris Catholic	Pequannock, NJ
G	3	Janelle Brown	5 ft 6 in (1.68 m)	So	Longwood	Middle Island, NY
F	11	Lou Lopez Sénéchal	6 ft 1 in (1.85 m)	Sr	NABA Academy	Grenoble, France
	15	Lauren Beach	6 ft 1 in (1.85 m)	Fr	Medway	Medway, MA
G	22	Rachel Hakes	6 ft 0 in (1.83 m)	Sr	Woodbury	Woodbury, MN
F	23	Callie Cavanaugh	6 ft 1 in (1.85 m)	RS Sr	Holyoke; FIU	Holyoke, MA
F	25	MacKenzie Daleba	5 ft 11 in (1.8 m)	So	Cathedral	Dorchester, MA
G	30	Sam Lewis	5 ft 11 in (1.8 m)	GS	Howard	Elkridge, MD
G	31	Sydney Lowery	5 ft 10 in (1.78 m)	GS	St. Luke's School; Boston College	Shelton, CT
C	32	Jazmine Carter	6 ft 1 in (1.85 m)	Sr	Timber Creek High School	Sicklerville, NJ
G	33	Brooke Tatarian	5 ft 10 in (1.78 m)	Fr	Masters School	Yonkers, NY
F	34	Dayna Tirado	6 ft 1 in (1.85 m)	So	Northern Valley Demarest	Closter, NJ
F	41	Andrea Hernangomez	6 ft 1 in (1.85 m)	Sr	IES Carmen Conde	Madrid, Spain
G	42	MacKenzie Martin	5 ft 10 in (1.78 m)	Jr	Westhill High School	Syracuse, NY
G	55	Jocelyn Polansky	5 ft 10 in (1.78 m)	Jr	Choate Rosemary Hall; Utah State	Wallingford, CT

Head coach

- Joe Frager (Connecticut)

Assistant coach(es)

- Laura Scinto (Bryant)
- David Jollon (Thomas Edison State)
- Macey Hollenshead (Fairfield)

Legend

- (C) Team captain
- (S) Suspended
- (I) Ineligible
- (W) Walk-on
- Injured
- Current redshirt

Roster
Last update: July 15, 2024

== Schedule and results ==
Date time, TV	Rank^{#}	Opponent^{#}	Result	Record	Site (attendance) city, state
Non-conference regular season
November 9, 2021*; 7:00 p.m., ESPN3		Brown	W 76–52	1–0	Webster Bank Arena (611); Bridgeport, CT
November 14, 2021*; 2:00 p.m.		at Rutgers	L 42–48	1–1	Jersey Mike's Arena (1,239); Piscataway, NJ
November 19, 2021*; 1:30 p.m., ESPN3		vs. Stetson; MAAC/ASUN Challenge	W 59–50	2–1	HP Field House (212); Kissimmee, FL
November 19, 2021*; 12:00 p.m., ESPN3		vs. Florida Gulf Coast; MAAC/ASUN Challenge	L 61–83	2–2	HP Field House (203); Kissimmee, FL
November 23, 2021*; 6:00 p.m., ESPN+		at Navy	W 76–52	3–2	Alumni Hall (301); Annapolis, MD
November 28, 2021*; 4:30 p.m., ESPN3		Yale	L 64–71	3–3	Webster Bank Arena (1,529); Bridgeport, CT
December 1, 2021*; 7:00 p.m., NESN		at UMass	L 61–74	3–4	Mullins Center (407); Amherst, MA
December 6, 2021*; 7:00 p.m., ESPN3		Sacred Heart	Postponed		Webster Bank Arena; Bridgeport, CT
December 9, 2021*; 7:00 p.m., BTN+		at No. 10 Indiana	L 58–91	3–5	Simon Skjodt Assembly Hall (3,091); Bloomington, IN
MAAC regular season
December 18, 2021; 2:00 p.m., ESPN+		Marist	W 57–52	4–5 (1–0)	Webster Bank Arena (637); Bridgeport, CT
December 20, 2021; 6:00 p.m., ESPN3		at Quinnipiac	W 66–52	5–5 (2–0)	People's United Center (512); Hamden, CT
December 30, 2021; 7:00 p.m., ESPN+		Iona	W 69–52	6–5 (3–0)	Webster Bank Arena (351); Bridgeport, CT
January 8, 2022; 7:00 p.m., ESPN3		at Rider	W 62–54	7–5 (4–0)	Alumni Gymnasium (712); Lawrenceville, NJ
January 13, 2022; 2:00 p.m., ESPN3		at Niagara	W 62–54	8–5 (5–0)	Gallagher Center (312); Lewiston, NY
January 15, 2022; 1:00 p.m., ESPN3		at Canisius	W 73–37	9–5 (6–0)	Koessler Athletic Center (505); Buffalo, NY
January 20, 2022; 5:00 p.m., ESPN+		Manhattan	W 70–55	10–5 (7–0)	Webster Bank Arena (567); Bridgeport, CT
January 22, 2022; 3:30 p.m., ESPN3		at Siena	L 56–68	10–6 (7–1)	Alumni Recreation Center (151); Loudonville, NY
January 24, 2022; 7:00 p.m., ESPN3		at Monmouth; Rescheduled from January 1	W 61–54	11–6 (8–1)	OceanFirst Bank Center (489); West Long Branch, NJ
January 27, 2022; 2:00 p.m., ESPN3		at Marist	W 59–39	12–6 (9–1)	McCann Arena (1,199); Poughkeepsie, NY
February 1, 2022; 1:00 p.m., ESPN+		Saint Peter's; Rescheduled from January 6	W 63–56	13–6 (10–1)	Webster Bank Arena (163); Bridgeport, CT
February 3, 2022; 2:00 p.m., ESPN3		Niagara	W 75–72	14–6 (11–1)	Webster Bank Arena (576); Bridgeport, CT
February 5, 2022; 1:00 p.m., ESPN+		Canisius	W 63–54 ^{OT}	15–6 (12–1)	Webster Bank Arena (613); Bridgeport, CT
February 10, 2022; 7:00 p.m., ESPN3		at Iona	W 54–29	16–6 (13–1)	Hynes Athletic Center (512); New Rochelle, NY
February 12, 2022; 3:30 p.m., ESPN+		Siena	W 64–48	17–6 (14–1)	Webster Bank Arena (651); Bridgeport, CT
February 17, 2022; 7:00 p.m., ESPN+		Quinnipiac	W 59–54 ^{OT}	18–6 (15–1)	Webster Bank Arena (1,231); Bridgeport, CT
February 24, 2022; 7:00 p.m., ESPN+		Monmouth	W 75–52	19–6 (16–1)	Webster Bank Arena (732); Bridgeport, CT
February 26, 2022; 2:00 p.m., ESPN3		at Manhattan	W 75–63	20–6 (17–1)	Draddy Gymnasium (100); Riverdale, NY
March 3, 2022; 5:00 p.m., ESPN+		Rider	W 65–61	20–6 (17–1)	Webster Bank Arena (876); Bridgeport, CT
March 5, 2022; 1:00 p.m., ESPN3		at Saint Peter's	W 56–43	22–6 (19–1)	Run Baby Run Arena (305); Jersey City, NJ
MAAC women's tournament
March 9, 2022; 1:30 p.m., ESPN+	(1)	vs. (8) Iona; Quarterfinals	W 69–56	23–6	Boardwalk Hall; Atlantic City, NJ
March 11, 2022; 11:00 a.m., ESPN+	(1)	vs. (4) Niagara; Semifinals	W 75–38	24–6	Boardwalk Hall; Atlantic City, NJ
March 12, 2022; 11:00 a.m., ESPN+	(1)	vs. (3) Manhattan; Championship	W 73–68	25–6	Boardwalk Hall; Atlantic City, NJ
NCAA women's tournament
March 18, 2022*; 7:00 p.m., ESPN2	(15 S)	at (2 B) No. 6 Texas; First round	L 52–70	25–7	Frank Erwin Center (3,822); Austin, TX
*Non-conference game. ^{#}Rankings from AP poll. (#) Tournament seedings in parentheses. S=Spokane. All times are in Eastern.

== See also ==
- 2021–22 Fairfield Stags men's basketball team
