= 2021–22 Southwestern Athletic Conference women's basketball season =

- League: NCAA Division I
- Sport: Basketball
- Teams: 12

Regular season

Southwestern Athletic Conference tournament

SWAC women's basketball seasons
- ← 2020–21 2022–23 →

2021–22 SWAC women's basketball standings
	Conf.				Overall
Team	W		L	PCT	W		L	PCT
Jackson State †	18	–	0	1.000	23	–	7	.767
Alabama A&M	13	–	5	.722	15	–	14	.517
Alabama State	12	–	6	.667	15	–	15	.500
Southern	11	–	7	.611	14	–	17	.452
Texas Southern	11	–	7	.611	11	–	15	.423
Prairie View A&M	10	–	8	.556	13	–	17	.433
Grambling State	10	–	8	.556	14	–	17	.452
Arkansas–Pine Bluff	9	–	9	.500	13	–	16	.448
Bethune–Cookman	5	–	13	.278	6	–	21	.222
Florida A&M	4	–	14	.222	3	–	25	.107
Mississippi Valley State	3	–	15	.167	4	–	22	.154
Alcorn State	2	–	16	.111	3	–	22	.120
† 2022 SWAC tournament winner

The 2021–22 Southwestern Athletic Conference women's basketball season is scheduled to begin with practices in October 2021 followed by the 2021–22 NCAA Division I women's basketball season in November 2021. The conference is scheduled to begin in December 2021. This was the 41st season under the Southwestern Athletic Conference name.

The SWAC tournament is scheduled for March 9–12, 2022 at the Bartow Arena in Birmingham, Alabama.

== Pre-season ==
=== Preseason polls ===
==== SWAC Coaches' Poll ====
Women's Basketball Preseason Poll (Coaches)
Place	Team	Points	First place votes
1.	Jackson State	255	19
2.	Alabama State	238	1
3.	Southern	194	1
4.	Alabama A&M	190	1
5.	Grambling State	147	—
6.	Texas Southern	142	―
7.	Alcorn State	118	―
8.	Bethune–Cookman	101	―
9.	Arkansas–Pine Bluff	98	―
10.	Prairie View A&M	93	―
11.	Florida A&M	91	―
12.	Mississippi Valley State	49	―

=== SWAC Preseason All-Conference ===
==== Preseason All-SWAC First Team ====
Name	School	Pos.	Yr.	Ht.	Hometown (Last School)
Dayzsha Rogan	Jackson State	Sr.	G	5'4	Ripley, MS (Northeast)
Ayana Emmanuel	Alabama State	Sr.	G	5'9	Fort Lauderdale, FL (Dillard HS)
Shmya Ward	Alabama State	R-Jr.	F	6'0	Memphis, TN (Whitehaven HS)
Dariauna Lewis	Alabama A&M	Sr.	F	6'1	Omaha, NE (Missouri State)
Ameshya Williams	Jackson State	Sr.	C	6'4	Gulfport, MS, (West Harrison HS)

==== Preseason All-SWAC Second Team ====
Name	School	Pos.	Yr.	Ht.	Hometown (Last School)
Ataiya Bridges	Texas Southern	GS	G	5'4	Lanett, AL (Shelton State)
Genovea Johnson	Southern	Jr.	G	5'8	Fort Lauderdale, FL (Dillard HS)
Deshawna Harper	Alabama A&M	GS	G	5'4	Indianapolis, IN (Heritage HS)
Jayla Crawford	Alabama State	Sr.	G	5'7	Birmingham, AL (Huffman HS)
Khadijah Brown	Arkansas-Pine Bluff	R-Sr.	C	6'3	Miami, FL (Jacksonville)

=== Midseason watchlists ===
Below is a table of notable midseason watch lists.

Wooden	Naismith	Liberman	Drysdale	Miller	McClain	Leslie	Wade

=== Final watchlists ===
Below is a table of notable year end watch lists.

Wooden	Naismith	Liberman	Drysdale	Miller	McClain	Leslie	Wade

== Regular season ==
On 30 December 2021 Southwestern Athletic Conference update their COVID-19 protocol. If a team is unable to play due to COVID-19 related issues the match will be counted as a forfeit for the purpose of the conference standings resulting in a loss for the team that caused the cancellation and a win for the opposing team. As per NCAA policy, a COVID-19 related forfeit not change a team's official won-lost record, nor will it impact statistics or coaching records. It will only count for the purpose of the conference standings.

=== Records against other conferences ===
2021–22 records against non-conference foes as of (December 30, 2021):

Regular season

Power 7 Conferences	Record
American	1–9
ACC	0–5
Big East	0–3
Big Ten	0–4
Big 12	0–5
Pac-12	0–3
SEC	0–20
Power 7 Conferences Total	1–49
Other NCAA Division 1 Conferences	Record
America East	0–0
A-10	0–2
ASUN	0–5
Big Sky	0–1
Big South	0–0
Big West	0–0
CAA	0–1
C-USA	2–10
Horizon	0–0
Ivy League	0–0
MAAC	0–0
MAC	0–1
MEAC	1–0
MVC	0–1
Mountain West	0–3
NEC	0–0
OVC	1–4
Patriot League	0–0
SoCon	1–0
Southland	3–4
Summit League	0–1
Sun Belt	3–10
WAC	0–1
WCC	0–1
Other Division I Total	11–45
Division II Total	1–1
NCAA Division I Total	12–94
NAIA Conferences	Record
AMC	0–0
GCAC	1–0
GPAC	0–0
Independent	1–0
NSAA	0–0
RRAC	5–0
SSAC	1–0
Sun Conference	1–0
NAIA Total	9–0

Post Season

Power 7 Conferences	Record
American	0–0
ACC	0–0
Big East	0–0
Big Ten	0–0
Big 12	0–0
Pac-12	0–0
SEC	0–0
Power 7 Conferences Total	0–0
Other NCAA Division 1 Conferences	Record
America East	0–0
A-10	0–0
ASUN	0–0
Big Sky	0–0
Big South	0–0
Big West	0–0
CAA	0–0
C-USA	0–0
Horizon	0–0
Ivy League	0–0
MAAC	0–0
MAC	0–0
MEAC	0–0
MVC	0–0
Mountain West	0–0
NEC	0–0
OVC	0–0
Patriot League	0–0
SoCon	0–0
Southland	0–0
Summit League	0–0
Sun Belt	0–0
WAC	0–0
WCC	0–0
Other Division I Total	0–0
NCAA Division I Total	0–0

=== Record against ranked non-conference opponents ===
This is a list of games against ranked opponents only (rankings from the AP Poll):

Date	Visitor	Home	Site	Significance	Score	Conference record
Nov 11	Alabama State	No. 21 South Florida	Yuengling Center ● Tampa, FL	―	L 37–72	0–1
Nov 11	Southern	No. 23 Texas A&M	Reed Arena ● College Station, TX	―	L 32–92	0–2
Nov 15	Texas Southern	No. 11 Arizona	McKale Center ● Tucson, AZ	―	L 38–93	0–3
Nov 17	Southern	No. 8 Iowa	Carver–Hawkeye Arena ● Iowa City, IA	―	L 67–87	0–4
Nov 21	Southern	No. 14 Iowa State	Hilton Coliseum ● Ames, IA	―	L 55–96	0–5
Nov 21	Grambling State	No. 17 Florida State	Donald L. Tucker Center ● Tallahassee, FL	―	L 53–76	0–6
Dec 1	Jackson State	No. 15 Texas	Frank Erwin Center ● Austin, TX	―	L 64–78	0–7
Dec 8	Alcorn State	No. 5 Baylor	Ferrell Center ● Waco, TX	―	L 40–94	0–8
Dec 9	Texas Southern	No. 18 Texas A&M	Reed Arena ● College Station, TX	―	L 43–88	0–9
Dec 12	Texas Southern	No. 24 LSU	Pete Maravich Assembly Center ● Baton Rouge, LA	―	L 55–96	0–10
Dec 15	Alcorn State	No. 22 LSU	Pete Maravich Assembly Center ● Baton Rouge, LA	―	L 36–100	0–11
Dec 15	Alabama State	No. 24 Ohio State	Schottenstein Center ● Columbus, OH	―	L 51–97	0–12
Dec 19	Prairie View A&M	No. 12 Iowa State	Hilton Coliseum ● Ames, IA	―	L 39–108	0–13
Dec 21	Alabama State	No. 25 North Carolina	Carmichael Arena ● Chapel Hill, NC	―	L 47–83	0–14
Dec 29	Alcorn State	No. 12 Texas	Frank Erwin Center ● Austin, TX	Canceled due to COVID-19		

Team rankings are reflective of AP poll when the game was played, not current or final ranking

† denotes game was played on neutral site

== Postseason ==
=== SWAC tournament ===
Jackson State won the conference tournament from March 9–12, 2022, at the Bartow Arena, Birmingham, AL. The top eight teams from the conference regular season play at the tournament. Teams were seeded by conference record, with ties broken by with a tie–breaker system to seed teams with identical conference records.

Quarterfinals; March 9 & 10; ESPN+
1	Jackson State	78
8	Arkansas-Pine Bluff	67
4	Southern	68
5	Texas Southern	67
3	Alabama State	60
6	Prairie View A&M	58
2	Alabama A&M	54
7	Grambling State	62

Semifinals; March 11; ESPN+
1	Jackson State	59
4	Southern	46
3	Alabama State	74
7	Grambling State	59

Championship; March 12; ESPN+
1	Jackson State	101
3	Alabama State	80

=== NCAA tournament ===
One team from the conference were selected to participate: Jackson State.

Seed	Region	School	First Round	Second Round	Sweet Sixteen	Elite Eight	Final Four	Championship
No. 14	Spokane Regional	Jackson State	lost to No. 3 LSU 77–83	–	–	–	–	–
	1 Bid	W-L (%):	0–1 (.000)	0–0 (–)	0–0 (–)	0–0 (–)	0–0 (–)	TOTAL: 0–1 (.000)

Index to colors and formatting
SWAC member won
SWAC member lost

=== National Invitation Tournament ===
Three conferences (Big Ten, Big 12, SWAC) rejected their bids to participate WNIT, so SWAC team didn't participate this year WNIT.

== Awards and honors ==
=== Players of the Week ===
Throughout the conference regular season, the SWAC offices named one or two players of the week each week.

Week	Player of the Week	School	Impact Player of the Week	School	Ref.
Nov. 18	Morgan Beacham	Bethune–Cookman	Taylor Williams	Bethune–Cookman	
Nov. 24	Gerlyn Smith	Prairie View A&M	Deshawna Harper	Alabama A&M	
Dec. 2	Mikayla Etienne	Mississippi Valley State	Khadijah Brown	Arkansas–Pine Bluff	
Dec. 8	Zaay Green	Arkansas–Pine Bluff	Sade Hudson	Arkansas–Pine Bluff	
Dec. 15	Nigeria Jones	Alabama A&M	Dariauna Lewis	Alabama A&M	
Dec. 22	Dylan Horton	Florida A&M	Dariauna Lewis (2)	Alabama A&M	
Dec. 29	Tynesha Rudolph	Alabama State	Alexus Holt	Grambling State	
Jan. 5	Dariauna Lewis	Alabama A&M	Maleaha Bell	Florida A&M	
Jan. 12	Dylan Horton (2)	Florida A&M	Ameshya Williams-Holliday	Jackson State	
Jan. 19	Dylan Horton (3)	Florida A&M	Andriana Avent	Texas Southern	
Jan. 25	Dariauna Lewis (2)	Alabama A&M	Ameshya Williams-Holliday (2)	Jackson State	
Feb. 1	Ameshya Williams-Holliday	Jackson State	Andriana Avent (2)	Texas Southern	
Feb. 8	Alexus Holt	Grambling State	Zaay Green	Arkansas–Pine Bluff	
Feb. 15	Ameshya Williams-Holliday (2)	Jackson State	Ataiya Bridges	Texas Southern	
Feb. 22	Ayana Emmanuel	Alabama State	Andriana Avent (3)	Texas Southern	
TBD	―	―	―	―	
TBD	―	―	―	―	
TBD	―	―	―	―	

==== Totals per School ====
School	Total
Alabama A&M	6
Arkansas–Pine Bluff	4
Florida A&M	4
Jackson State	4
Texas Southern	4
Alabama State	2
Bethune–Cookman	2
Grambling State	2
Mississippi Valley State	1
Prairie View A&M	1

== WNBA draft ==
The SWAC had one player selected in the WNBA Draft. Ameshya Williams-Holliday from Jackson State selected by Indiana Fever on the 3rd round 25th overall pick. Williams-Holliday was the first player from HBCU, who selected on the WNBA draft since 2002.

Player	Team	Round	Pick #	Position	School
Ameshya Williams-Holliday	Indiana Fever	3	25	Center	Jackson State
