= 2021–22 Texas Longhorns women's basketball team =

Intercollegiate basketball season

2021–22 Texas Longhorns women's basketball

Big 12 tournament champions

NCAA tournament, Elite Eight
- Conference: Big 12 Conference

Ranking
- Coaches: No. 6
- AP: No. 6
- Record: 29–7 (13–5 Big 12)
- Head coach: Vic Schaefer (2nd season)
- Associate head coach: Dionnah Jackson-Durrett (2nd season)
- Assistant coaches: Calamity McEntire (1st season); April Phillips (1st season)
- Home arena: Frank Erwin Center

2021–22 Big 12 Conference women's basketball standings
	Conf.				Overall
Team	W		L	PCT	W		L	PCT
No. 7 Baylor	15	–	3	.833	28	–	7	.800
No. 10 Iowa State	14	–	4	.778	28	–	7	.800
No. 6 Texas †	13	–	5	.722	29	–	7	.806
No. 22 Oklahoma	12	–	6	.667	25	–	9	.735
Kansas	11	–	7	.611	21	–	10	.677
Kansas State	9	–	9	.500	20	–	13	.606
West Virginia	7	–	11	.389	15	–	15	.500
Texas Tech	4	–	14	.222	11	–	19	.367
Oklahoma State	3	–	15	.167	9	–	20	.310
TCU	2	–	16	.111	6	–	22	.214
† 2022 Big 12 Tournament winner Rankings from AP poll

The 2021–22 Texas Longhorns women's basketball team represented the University of Texas at Austin in the 2021–22 NCAA Division I women's basketball season. The team was coached by Vic Schaefer who entered his second season at Texas. The Longhorns were members of the Big 12 Conference and played their home games at the Frank Erwin Center.

This was the Longhorns' final season at the Frank Erwin Center, with the new Moody Center opening for the 2022–23 season.

== Previous season ==
The Longhorns finished the season 21–10, 11–7 in Big 12 play to finish in fifth place. In the 2021 Big 12 Conference women's basketball tournament, Texas went 1–1 with a win against Iowa State and a second round loss to Baylor. However, the Longhorns are coming off a strong showing in the 2021 NCAA Division I women's basketball tournament, making it to Elite 8. In the NCAA tournament, the Longhorns defeated Bradley, UCLA, and Maryland. In the Elite 8 game, Texas was defeated by 6th ranked South Carolina 62–34.

== Offseason ==
=== Departures ===
Name	Number	Pos.	Height	Year	Hometown	Reason for departure
Charli Collier	35	F/C	6’5”	Junior	Mont Belvieu, TX	Declared for the 2021 WNBA draft, in which she was chosen first overall by the Dallas Wings.
Kyra Lambert	15	PG	5'9"	GS	Cibolo, TX	Graduated; chose not to take advantage of the NCAA's COVID-19 eligibility waiver
Karisma Ortiz	3	G	6'0"	GS	San Jose, CA	Transferred to California
Elyssa Coleman	20	F	6'3"	Sophomore	Humble, TX	Transferred to UTSA
Celeste Taylor	0	G	5'11"	Sophomore	Valley Stream, NY	Transferred to Duke
Ashley Chevalier^	25	G	5'7"	Sophomore	Chatsworth, CA	Entered Transfer Portal

^Chevalier transferred seven games into the 2021-2022 season.

=== Incoming transfers ===
Name	Pos.	Height	Year	Hometown	Notes
Aliyah Matharu	G	5'7"	Junior	Washington, D.C.	Transferred from Mississippi State.
Femme Masudi	C	6'5"	Junior	Goma, DR Congo	Transferred from South Georgia Technical College.
Kobe King-Hawea	G	5'11"	Junior	Point Cook, VIC, Australia	Transferred from Casper College.
Anissa Gutierrez	G	5'7"	Freshman	Mansfield, TX	Transferred from Hendrix College.

=== 2021 recruiting class ===
College recruiting
Name	Hometown	School	Height	Weight	Commit date
Aayliah Moore; F	Moore, OK	Moore High School	6 ft 1 in (1.85 m)	N/A	
Aayliah Moore; F	Recruit ratings: ESPN: (97)				
Rori Harmon; PG	Houston, TX	Cypress Creek High School	5 ft 6 in (1.68 m)	N/A	
Rori Harmon; PG	Recruit ratings: ESPN: (97)				
Kyndall Hunter; PG	Houston, TX	Cypress Creek High School	5 ft 8 in (1.73 m)	N/A	
Kyndall Hunter; PG	Recruit ratings: ESPN: (95)				
Latasha Lattimore; F	Toronto, ON	Royal Crown Academic School	6 ft 4 in (1.93 m)	N/A	
Latasha Lattimore; F	Recruit ratings: ESPN: (93)				
Overall recruiting rankings:
Note: In many cases, Scout, Rivals, 247Sports, and ESPN may conflict in their listings of height and weight.; In these cases, the average was taken. ESPN grades are on a 100-point scale.; Sources: "2021 Player Commits". ESPN.com.

=== 2022 recruiting class ===
College recruiting (2022)
Name	Hometown	School	Height	Weight	Commit date
Ndjakalenga Mwenentanda; W	Sioux Falls, SD	Washington High School	6 ft 1 in (1.85 m)	N/A	
Ndjakalenga Mwenentanda; W	Recruit ratings: ESPN: (95)				
Amina Muhammad; F	Desoto, TX	Desoto High School	6 ft 3 in (1.91 m)	N/A	
Amina Muhammad; F	Recruit ratings: ESPN: (93)				
Jordana Codio; G	Jupiter, FL	Montverde Academy	6 ft 1 in (1.85 m)	N/A	
Jordana Codio; G	Recruit ratings: ESPN: (93)				
Overall recruiting rankings:
Note: In many cases, Scout, Rivals, 247Sports, and ESPN may conflict in their listings of height and weight.; In these cases, the average was taken. ESPN grades are on a 100-point scale.; Sources: "2022 Player Commits". ESPN.com.

=== Coaching staff departures ===
Name	Position	New Team	New Position
Johnnie Harris	Assistant Coach	Auburn	Head coach
Elena Lovato^	Assistant Coach		

^Elena Lovato is currently not coaching at the collegiate level.

=== 2021 WNBA draft ===
Round	Pick	Player	Position	WNBA Team
#1	1	Charli Collier	C	Dallas Wings

== Preseason ==
=== Big 12 media poll ===
Big 12 media poll
Predicted finish	Team	Votes (1st place)
1	Baylor	79 (7)
T-2	Texas	67 (2)
T-2	Iowa State	67 (1)
4	West Virginia	58
5	Oklahoma	44
6	TCU	32
7	Oklahoma State	30
T-8	Kansas State	26
T-8	Texas Tech	26
10	Kansas	17

=== Preseason All-Big 12 teams ===
1st team

Joanne Allen-Taylor – G (Coaches, Media)

Honorable Mention

Rori Harmon – G (Coaches, Media)

=== Preseason Big 12 Awards ===
Award	Player	Position	Year
Preseason Freshman of the Year	Aaliyah Moore	F	Fr.

== Roster ==
2021–22 Texas Longhorns women's basketball team
Players
Coaches

Pos.	#	Name	Height	Year	Previous school	Hometown
F/C	1	Lauren Ebo	6 ft 4 in (1.93 m)	Sr	Riverdale Baptist	Washington, DC
G	2	Aliyah Matharu	5 ft 7 in (1.7 m)	Jr	Mississippi State	Washington, DC
PG	3	Rori Harmon	5 ft 6 in (1.68 m)	Fr	Cypress Creek	Houston, TX
G	4	Kobe King-Hawea	5 ft 11 in (1.8 m)	So	Casper College	Point Cook, VIC, Australia
F	5	Deyona Gaston	6 ft 2 in (1.88 m)	So	Pearland	Pearland, TX
G	10	Shay Holle	6 ft 0 in (1.83 m)	So	Westlake	Austin, TX
G	11	Joanne Allen-Taylor	5 ft 8 in (1.73 m)	Sr	Cypress Falls	Houston, TX
F	21	Aaliyah Moore	6 ft 1 in (1.85 m)	Fr	Moore	Moore, OK
PG	22	Kyndall Hunter	5 ft 8 in (1.73 m)	Fr	Cypress Creek	Houston, TX
G/F	31	Audrey Warren	5 ft 9 in (1.75 m)	Sr	Boswell	Fort Worth, TX
C	34	Femme Masudi	6 ft 5 in (1.96 m)	Jr	South Georgia Technical College	Goma, DR Congo
F/C	35	Latasha Lattimore	6 ft 4 in (1.93 m)	Fr	Royal Crown Academic School	Toronto, ON
G	40	Anissa Gutierrez	5 ft 7 in (1.7 m)	Fr	Mansfield Summit High School	Mansfield, TX

Head coach

- Vic Schaefer (Texas A&M)

Assistant coach(es)

- Dionnah Jackson-Durrett (Oklahoma)
- April Phillips (Xavier)
- Calamity McEntire (Eastern Oklahoma State)

Legend

- (C) Team captain
- (S) Suspended
- (I) Ineligible
- (W) Walk-on
- Injured
- Current redshirt

Roster

== Schedule and results ==
Date time, TV	Rank^{#}	Opponent^{#}	Result	Record	High points	High rebounds	High assists	Site (attendance) city, state
Exhibition
November 4, 2021*; 7:00 p.m., LHN	No. 25	Oklahoma Baptist	W 77–44	0–0	16 – Warren	11 – Masudi	5 – Warren	Gregory Gymnasium (N/A); Austin, TX
Regular season (23–6)
November 9, 2021*; 5:30 p.m., LHN	No. 25	New Orleans	W 131–36	1–0	27 – Hunter	8 – Gaston	8 – Harmon	Frank Erwin Center (N/A); Austin, TX
November 14, 2021*; 2:00 p.m., ESPN	No. 25	at No. 3 Stanford	W 61–56	2–0	21 – Harmon	6 – Ebo	1 – Tied	Maples Pavilion (3,681); Stanford, CA
November 17, 2021*; 11:00 a.m., LHN	No. 12	Southeast Missouri	W 88–47	3–0	13 – Allen-Taylor	10 – Ebo	6 – Chevalier	Frank Erwin Center (4,854); Austin, TX
November 21, 2021*; 12:00 p.m., ESPN	No. 12	at No. 16 Tennessee	L 70–74 ^{OT}	3–1	27 – Matharu	8 – Tied	11 – Harmon	Thompson–Boling Arena (9,460); Knoxville, TN
November 27, 2021*; 1:00 p.m., LHN	No. 14	Cal State Northridge	W 83–42	4–1	19 – Gaston	8 – Tied	9 – Harmon	Frank Erwin Center (2,478); Austin, TX
December 1, 2021*; 7:00 p.m., LHN	No. 15	Jackson State	W 78–64	5–1	14 – Ebo	7 – Ebo	6 – Harmon	Frank Erwin Center (2,127); Austin, TX
December 5, 2021*; 3:00 p.m., SEC Network	No. 15	at No. 17 Texas A&M; Big 12/SEC Women's Challenge	W 76–60	6–1	26 – Matharu	9 – Warren	9 – Harmon	Reed Arena (7,100); College Station, TX
December 11, 2021*; 1:00 p.m., LHN	No. 11	Idaho	W 83–43	7–1	19 – Gaston	10 – Lattimore	3 – Tied	Frank Erwin Center (1,124); Austin, TX
December 19, 2021*; 4:30 p.m., ESPN2	No. 11	vs. No. 4 Arizona; Pac-12 Coast-to-Coast Challenge	Cancelled due to COVID-19 issues					T-Mobile Arena; Las Vegas, NV
December 19, 2021*; 4:30 p.m., ESPN2	No. 11	vs. San Diego; Pac-12 Coast-to-Coast Challenge	W 74–58	8–1	22 – Matharu	10 – Gaston	4 – Warren	T-Mobile Arena (N/A); Las Vegas, NV
December 22, 2021*; 11:00 a.m., ESPN+	No. 12	at Princeton	W 70–53	9–1	18 – Allen-Taylor	7 – Harmon	2 – Tied	Jadwin Gymnasium (722); Princeton, NJ
December 29, 2021*; 7:00 p.m., LHN	No. 12	Alcorn State	Cancelled due to COVID-19 issues					Frank Erwin Center; Austin, TX
January 2, 2022; 2:00 p.m., ESPN+	No. 12	at Oklahoma State	W 62–51	10–1 (1–0)	14 – Tied	10 – Ebo	2 – Tied	Gallagher-Iba Arena (2,041); Stillwater, OK
January 5, 2022; 7:00 p.m., LHN	No. 9	Texas Tech	L 61–74	10–2 (1–1)	12 – Matharu	6 – Ebo	4 – Harmon	Frank Erwin Center (2,723); Austin, TX
January 9, 2022; 2:00 p.m., ESPN	No. 9	at No. 14 Baylor	Postponed due to COVID-19 protocols from Baylor					Ferrell Center; Waco, TX
January 9, 2022; 2:00 p.m., LHN	No. 9	at UTRGV	W 93–58	11–2 (1–1)	18 – Matharu	15 – Moore	4 – Warren	Frank Erwin Center (1,956); Austin, TX
January 12, 2022; 7:00 p.m., LHN	No. 13	Kansas	L 66–70	11–3 (1–2)	18 – Allen-Taylor	9 – Harmon	7 – Harmon	Frank Erwin Center (2,379); Austin, TX
January 15, 2022; 7:00 p.m., LHN	No. 13	West Virginia	W 73–57	12–3 (2–2)	26 – Matharu	9 – Tied	3 – Harmon	Frank Erwin Center (2,843); Austin, TX
January 19, 2022; 6:30 p.m., ESPN+	No. 15т	at No. 7 Iowa State	W 66–48	13–3 (3–2)	14 – Gaston	7 – Matharu	5 – Matharu	Hilton Coliseum (9,774); Ames, IA
January 22, 2022; 1:00 p.m., ESPN+	No. 15т	at TCU	W 68–47	14–3 (4–2)	14 – Allen-Taylor	13 – Ebo	5 – Tied	Schollmaier Arena (2,228); Fort Worth, TX
January 26, 2022; 7:00 p.m., LHN	No. 9	No. 25 Kansas State	W 66–48	15–3 (5–2)	18 – Matharu	9 – Ebo	6 – Harmon	Frank Erwin Center (2,281); Austin, TX
January 29, 2022; 2:00 p.m., Bally	No. 9	at No. 18 Oklahoma	L 63–65	15–4 (5–3)	15 – Harmon	11 – Harmon	3 – Harmon	Lloyd Noble Center (3,315); Norman, OK
February 4, 2022; 7:00 p.m., ESPN2	No. 13	at No. 9 Baylor; Rescheduled from January 9, 2022	L 63–75	15–5 (5–4)	17 – Matharu	6 – Ebo	6 – Harmon	Ferrell Center (5,435); Waco, TX
February 6, 2022; 3:00 p.m., ESPN2	No. 13	No. 9 Baylor	L 55–63	15–6 (5–5)	18 – Allen-Taylor	7 – Warren	2 – Matharu	Frank Erwin Center (5,300); Austin, TX
February 9, 2022; 7:00 p.m., ESPN+	No. 16	at Texas Tech	W 61–56	16–6 (6–5)	14 – Allen-Taylor	9 – Lattimore	5 – Harmon	United Supermarkets Arena (4,821); Lubbock, TX
February 12, 2022; 7:00 p.m., LHN	No. 16	No. 12 Oklahoma	W 78–63	17–6 (7–5)	21 – Warren	14 – Ebo	3 – Harmon	Frank Erwin Center (3,793); Austin, TX
February 16, 2022; 7:00 p.m., LHN	No. 14	No. 6 Iowa State	W 73–48	18–6 (8–5)	20 – Harmon	8 – Ebo	9 – Harmon	Frank Erwin Center (2,585); Austin, TX
February 20, 2022; 11:00 a.m., ESPNU	No. 14	at West Virginia	W 67–58	19–6 (9–5)	19 – Harmon	8 – Harmon	7 – Harmon	WVU Coliseum (2,392); Morgantown, WV
February 23, 2022; 6:30 p.m., ESPN+	No. 11	at Kansas State	W 62–51	20–6 (10–5)	16 – Matharu	8 – Ebo	4 – Harmon	Bramlage Coliseum (3,927); Manhattan, KS
February 26, 2022; 7:00 p.m., LHN	No. 11	TCU	W 77–42	21–6 (11–5)	16 – Gaston	10 – Ebo	11 – Harmon	Frank Erwin Center (4,157); Austin, TX
March 2, 2022; 7:00 p.m., ESPN+	No. 9	at Kansas	W 70–60	22–6 (12–5)	20 – Allen-Taylor	7 – Tied	6 – Harmon	Allen Fieldhouse (2,490); Lawrence, KS
March 5, 2022; 1:00 p.m., LHN	No. 9	Oklahoma State	W 65–50	23–6 (13–5)	17 – Ebo	6 – Ebo	4 – Tied	Frank Erwin Center (12,506); Austin, TX
Big 12 tournament (3–0)
March 11, 2022; 7:30 p.m., ESPN+	(3) No. 7	vs. (6) Kansas State; Quarterfinals	W 72–65	24–6	17 – Ebo	10 – Ebo	4 – Harmon	Municipal Auditorium (5,163); Kansas City, MO
March 12, 2022; 2:30 p.m., ESPN+	(3) No. 7	vs. (2) No. 10 Iowa State; Semifinals	W 82–73 ^{OT}	25–6	30 – Harmon	10 – Gaston	4 – Tied	Municipal Auditorium (5,013); Kansas City, MO
March 13, 2022; 1:00 p.m., ESPN2	(3) No. 7	vs. (1) No. 4 Baylor; Championship	W 67–58	26–6	20 – Harmon	6 – Holle	5 – Harmon	Municipal Auditorium (3,442); Kansas City, MO
NCAA tournament (3–1)
March 18, 2022; 7:00 p.m., ESPN2	(2 S) No. 6	(15 S) Fairfield; First round	W 70–52	27–6	18 – Moore	10 – Moore	11 – Harmon	Frank Erwin Center (3,822); Austin, TX
March 20, 2022; 4:00 p.m., ESPN	(2 S) No. 6	(7 S) Utah; Second Round	W 78–56	28–6	21 – Moore	5 – Tied	8 – Harmon	Frank Erwin Center (4,960); Austin, TX
March 25, 2022; 6:00 p.m., ESPN2	(2 S) No. 6	vs. (6 S) No. 14 Ohio State; Sweet Sixteen	W 66–63	29–6	17 – Allen-Taylor	8 – Ebo	3 – Tied	Spokane Arena (N/A); Spokane, WA
March 27, 2022; 8:00 p.m., ESPN	(2 S) No. 6	vs. (1 S) No. 2 Stanford; Elite Eight	L 50–59	29–7	15 – Allen-Taylor	7 – Harmon	6 – Harmon	Spokane Arena (7,739); Spokane, WA
*Non-conference game. ^{#}Rankings from AP Poll. (#) Tournament seedings in parentheses. S=Spokane. All times are in Central Time.

Source:Schedule

== Big 12 tournament ==
Texas entered the Big 12 tournament as a 3 seed. In the first and second round, Texas defeated Kansas State 72–65 and Iowa State 82–73 to advance to the championship game. In the championship, the Longhorns emerged victorious against Baylor 67–58, winning the Big 12 tournament. Freshman Rori Harmon won most outstanding player and Lauren Ebo was selected to all-tournament team. This is the first Big 12 conference tournament championship for Texas since 2003.

First round Thursday, March 10
8	Texas Tech	58
9	Oklahoma State	73
7	West Virginia	68
10	TCU	48

Quarterfinals; Friday, March 11
1	Baylor	76
9	Oklahoma State	36
4	Oklahoma	80
5	Kansas	68
2	Iowa State	66
7	West Virginia	60
3	Texas	72
6	Kansas State	65

Semifinals; Saturday, March 12
1	Baylor	91
4	Oklahoma	76
2	Iowa State	73
3	Texas	82*

Championship Game; Sunday, March 13
1	Baylor	58
3	Texas	67

*denotes overtime

== NCAA tournament ==
Texas entered the NCAA tournament as a 2-seed where they faced off against 15-seed Fairfield. The Longhorns would go on to defeat the Stags 70–52, advancing Texas to the round of 32. In the round of 32, Texas played against 7-seed Utah. Texas defeated the Utes 78–56 sending them to the sweet 16 to match up with Ohio State. Against the Buckeyes, Texas won 66–63 advance Texas to their second consecutive elite 8. In the elite 8, the Longhorns faced Stanford, who they beat earlier in the regular season. However, Stanford prevailed against Texas, winning the game 59–50.

First round Round of 64; March 18–19
1	Stanford	78
16	Montana State	37
Stanford, California – Fri/Sun
8	Kansas	77
9	Georgia Tech	58
5	Virginia Tech	81
12	Florida Gulf Coast	84
College Park, Maryland – Fri/Sun
4	Maryland	102
13	Delaware	71
6	Ohio State	63
11	Missouri State	56
Baton Rouge, Louisiana – Sat/Mon
3	LSU	83
14	Jackson State	77
7	Utah	92
10	Arkansas	69
Austin, Texas – Fri/Sun
2	Texas	70
15	Fairfield	52

Second Round; Round of 32; March 20–21
1	Stanford	91
8	Kansas	65
12	Florida Gulf Coast	65
4	Maryland	89
6	Ohio State	79
3	LSU	64
7	Utah	56
2	Texas	78

Regional semifinals Sweet 16; March 25
1	Stanford	72
4	Maryland	66
6	Ohio State	63
2	Texas	66

Regional final Elite 8 March 27
1	Stanford	59
2	Texas	50

=== Spokane Regional final ===
ESPN

March 27
9:00 p.m.

#2 Texas Longhorns 50, #1 Stanford Cardinal 59
Scoring by quarter: 14–14, 13–16, 13–15, 10–14
Pts: Joanne Allen-Taylor (15); Rebs: Rori Harmon (7); Asts: Rori Harmon (6)	Pts: Lexie Hull (20); Rebs: Haley Jones (12); Asts: Lacie Hull; Haley Jones (4)

Spokane Arena
Attendance: 7,739
Referees: Dee Kantner, Michol Murray, Kenneth Nash

== Team and individual statistics ==
Individual player statistics (Final)
			Minutes		Scoring		Total FGs			3-point FGs			Free-Throws			Rebounds								
Player	GP	GS	Tot	Avg	Pts	Avg	FG	FGA	Pct	3FG	3FA	Pct	FT	FTA	Pct	Off	Def	Tot	Avg	A	PF	TO	Stl	Blk
Lauren Ebo	35	30	931	26.6	280	8.0	101	210	48.1%	0	0	0%	78	118	66.1%	97	139	236	6.7	22	91	46	20	27
Aliyah Matharu	36	11	788	21.9	431	12.0	153	357	42.9%	77	183	42.1%	48	71	67.6%	27	97	124	3.4	52	82	77	65	13
Rori Harmon	36	34	1081	30.0	409	11.4	144	363	39.7%	22	69	31.9%	99	135	73.3%	26	134	160	4.4	180	92	80	86	1
Kobe King-Hawea	5	0	53	10.6	20	4.0	8	22	36.4%	4	11	36.4%	0	0	0.0%	4	3	7	1.4	4	5	1	4	2
Deyona Gaston	34	28	625	18.4	240	7.1	98	189	51.9%	1	2	50.0%	43	63	68.3%	51	73	124	3.6	10	80	38	26	28
Shay Holle	35	14	569	16.3	131	3.7	55	134	41.0%	9	33	27.3%	12	26	46.2%	30	37	67	1.9	18	36	31	13	13
Joanne Allen-Taylor	36	36	1243	34.5	406	11.3	156	396	39.4%	30	90	33.3%	64	82	78.0%	24	61	85	2.4	65	66	51	49	5
Aaliyah Moore	28	9	360	12.9	168	6.0	58	113	51.3%	0	4	0.0%	52	70	74.3%	41	46	87	3.1	7	62	30	14	6
Kyndall Hunter	21	1	170	8.1	64	3.0	23	64	35.9%	14	36	38.9%	4	9	44.4%	3	9	12	0.6	9	15	14	8	0
Ashley Chevalier	7	0	89	12.7	19	2.7	6	15	40%	1	5	20%	6	8	75%	1	8	9	1.3	18	4	10	4	0
Audrey Warren	36	16	956	26.6	299	8.3	109	233	46.8%	11	28	39.3%	70	88	79.5%	66	85	151	4.2	63	87	84	57	10
Femme Masudi	15	0	70	4.7	18	1.2	7	17	41.2%	0	0	0.0%	4	7	57.1%	9	10	19	1.3	0	6	3	1	0
Latasha Lattimore	32	1	330	10.3	103	3.2	44	87	50.6%	0	5	0.0%	15	39	38.5%	38	51	89	2.8	8	32	30	10	20
Anissa Gutierrez	7	0	10	1.4	0	0.0	0	2	0.0%	0	0	0.0%	0	0	0.0%	0	0	0	0.0	0	1	0	0	0
Total	–	–	7275	202.1	2588	71.89	962	2202	43.7%	169	466	36.3%	495	716	69.1%	496	820	1316	36.6	456	659	513	357	125
Opponents	–	–	7275	202.1	2043	56.75	706	1816	38.9%	151	537	28.1%	480	649	74.0%	347	828	1175	32.6	374	689	758	259	122

Legend
GP	Games played	GS	Games started	Avg	Average per game
FG	Field-goals made	FGA	Field-goal attempts	Off	Offensive rebounds
Def	Defensive rebounds	A	Assists	TO	Turnovers
Blk	Blocks	Stl	Steals	High	Team high

=== Game highs ===
Team Game Highs
Stat	High	Opponent	Date
Points	131	New Orleans	November 9, 2021
Field goals made	47	New Orleans	November 9, 2021
Field Goal Attempts	83	Tennessee	November 21, 2021
3 Points Made	13	New Orleans	November 9, 2021
3 Points Attempted	23	New Orleans; Tennessee; Texas Tech; Iowa State	November 9, 2021; November 21, 2021; January 5, 2022; January 19, 2022
Free throws Made	26	West Virginia	January 15, 2022
Free Throw Attempts	43	New Orleans	November 9, 2021
Rebounds	53	New Orleans	November 9, 2021
Assists	30	New Orleans	November 9, 2021
Steals	17	New Orleans	November 9, 2021
Blocked Shots	8	Jackson State	December 1, 2021
Turnovers	24	Oklahoma	January 29, 2022
Fouls	34	Texas Tech	January 5, 2022

Individual Game Highs
Stat	Player	High	Opponent	Date
Points	Rori Harmon	30	Iowa State	March 12, 2022
Field goals made	Kyndall Hunter; Aliyah Matharu	10	New Orleans; Tennessee; Texas A&M	November 9, 2021; November 21, 2021; December 5, 2021
Field Goal Attempts	Joanne Allen-Taylor; Aliyah Matharu	18	Kansas; Tennessee	January 12, 2022; November 21, 2021
3 Points Made	Kyndall Hunter	7	New Orleans	November 9, 2021
3 Points Attempted	Aliyah Matharu	11	Tennessee	November 21, 2021
Free throws Made	Rori Harmon	9	Iowa State	March 12, 2022
Free Throw Attempts	Rori Harmon	12	Kansas	March 2, 2022
Rebounds	Aaliyah Moore	15	UTRGV	January 9, 2022
Assists	Rori Harmon	11	TCU; Tennessee; Fairfield	February 26, 2022; November 21, 2021; March 18, 2022
Steals	Aliyah Matharu	7	San Diego	December 19, 2021
Blocked Shots	Lauren Ebo; DeYona Gaston	5	Jackson State; Iowa State	December 1, 2021; January 19, 2022
Turnovers	Audrey Warren	7	Kansas	January 12, 2022

== Awards and honors ==
Weekly honors
Honors	Player	Position	Date Awarded	Ref.
Big 12 Freshman of the Week	Rori Harmon	PG	November 15, 2021	
Big 12 Freshman of the Week	Rori Harmon	PG	December 27, 2021	
Tamika Catchings Women’s Freshman Player of the Week	Rori Harmon	PG	December 28, 2021	
Big 12 Freshman of the Week	Rori Harmon	PG	January 17, 2022	
Big 12 Freshman of the Week	Rori Harmon	PG	February 21, 2022	
ESPN Women’s player of the Week	Rori Harmon	PG	February 21, 2022	

Conference honors
Honors	Player	Position
All-Big 12 Second Team	Joanne Allen-Taylor	G
All-Big 12 Second Team	Rori Harmon	G
All-Big 12 Honorable Mention	Lauren Ebo	F/C
All-Big 12 Honorable Mention	Aliyah Matharu	G
Big 12 All-Defensive Team	Rori Harmon	G
Big 12 All-Freshman Team	Rori Harmon	G
Big 12 Freshman of the Year	Rori Harmon	G
Big 12 tournament Most Outstanding Player	Rori Harmon	G
Big 12 All-Tournament Team	Lauren Ebo	F/C

National honors
Honors	Player	Position
Spokane Region All-Tournament Team	Joanne Allen-Taylor	G
Spokane Region All-Tournament Team	Rori Harmon	G

All-Americans
Team	Player	Position	Selector	Ref.
Honorable Mention	Rori Harmon	PG	AP; WBCA	

Coaching honors
Honor	Coach	Ref.
TABC Division I Coach of the Year	Vic Schaefer	

== Rankings ==
Ranking movements Legend: ██ Increase in ranking ██ Decrease in ranking т = Tied with team above or below
	Week																			
Poll	Pre	1	2	3	4	5	6	7	8	9	10	11	12	13	14	15	16	17	18	Final
AP	25	12	14	15	11	11	12	12	9	13	15т	9	13	16	14	11	9	7	6	Not released
Coaches	21	21^	16	14	12	12	13	13	10	12	14	10	13	17	14	12	10	9	7	6

^Coaches did not release a Week 1 poll.

== See also ==
- 2021–22 Texas Longhorns men's basketball team
