= Lou Lopez Sénéchal =

French basketball player (born 1998)

Dallas Wings
- Position: Guard / forward
- League: WNBA

Personal information
- Born: May 12, 1998 (age 28) Guadalajara, Mexico
- Listed height: 1.85 m (6 ft 1 in)
- Listed weight: 70 kg (155 lb)

Career information
- High school: North Atlantic Basketball Academy (Dublin, Ireland)
- College: Fairfield (2018–2022); UConn (2022–2023)
- WNBA draft: 2023: 1st round, 5th overall pick
- Drafted by: Dallas Wings
- Playing career: 2023–present

Career history
- 2023–present: Dallas Wings
- 2023: BK Brno
- 2024–present: Hozono Global Jairis

Career highlights
- MAAC Player of the Year (2022); 3× First-team All-MAAC (2020–2022); First-team All-Big East (2023); MAAC Rookie of the Year (2019); MAAC All-Rookie Team (2019); MAAC tournament MVP (2022)
- Stats at Basketball Reference

Lou Lopez Sénéchal (born May 12, 1998) is a Mexican-French professional basketball player for the Dallas Wings of the Women's National Basketball Association (WNBA) and Hozono Global Jairis of the Liga Femenina de Baloncesto. She played collegiate basketball for the Fairfield Stags and was named MAAC Player of the Year as a senior. She then went on to play for the UConn Huskies of the Big East Conference. She was selected 5th overall in the 2023 WNBA draft by the Dallas Wings.

== Early life ==
Lopez Sénéchal was born in Guadalajara, Mexico. Her father Carlos Lopez is Mexican and her mother Sophie Sénéchal is French. Her parents separated when she was five. She moved to Grenoble, France with her mother while her father remained in Mexico. She had grown up playing soccer but she tried basketball for the first time at the age of eight. With her soccer experience she had no problem with her legs, but using her hands to dribble was new. But this was the first time she truly felt at home while in France, because the sport was new to everyone in the class so she no longer "felt like an outsider. On the basketball court, she felt like an equal."

She attended high school in France but in 2017–18, she played basketball at the North Atlantic Basketball Academy in Ireland. While she was playing in Ireland, she had a chance conversation with a friend. Her friend remarked "I'm going to Canada to play college basketball". Until that conversation, she had never considered the possibility of playing in the Americas, but after the conversation it was all she could think about.

Along with her stepfather, she communicated with schools throughout the US. With help from her stepdad, they reached out to two hundred and eighty schools in both Division I and Division II. The only schools they didn't consider were those ranked in the top twenty-five, which at the time seemed too much of a stretch.

They received some responses, so the family scheduled a trip to the States that offered for scholarships. The schools included UMass Lowell, Tulsa, Akron, Duquesne and Fairfield. The head coach at Fairfield, Joe Frager, planned a 45-minute workout to see what she could do. After only 10 minutes he indicated that the workout was over. She asked him what she had done wrong, he responded that she had done everything right. He had seen plenty of game film but wanted to see her in action to assess her personal attributes. He concluded she was open to being coached. Lopez Sénéchal accepted the offer and enrolled at Fairfield.

== College career ==
=== Fairfield ===
Lopez Sénéchal played for four years and graduated from Fairfield University before transferring to UConn. She is 6-foot-1in tall and plays wing.

In her freshman year, she sat for an interview with the Fairfield Mirror, the student newspaper at the school. She discussed the challenges of adapting to college in the United States after living in France most of her life. She played basketball in France and Ireland, and noted that her teammates and friends were typically 25 years old or older, while she was now playing with teammates closer to her age.

By her senior year she was being described as "arguably the conference's best offensive player". That description followed a 26 point performance against Quinnipiac, leading to "a convincing 72-60 win" by Fairfield over Quinnipiac on their home floor. At the time, Quinnipiac was the five-time regular-season champion of the MAAC.

At Fairfield, she led the team to an appearance in the NCAA tournament. Before the season started, the head coach of Fairfield, Joe Frager, had announced his retirement as of the end of the season. The team, led by Lopez Sénéchal, helped extend that retirement date as long as possible, winning their first conference title since 1998. That automatically qualified them for an NCAA tournament bid, their first such bid since 2001. They were seeded 15th and faced second seed Texas, ranked seventh in the country. They arrived in Austin two days before the game and met for a team dinner, with players pointing out that it was the first such team dinner in a restaurant for two years due to COVID restrictions.

In the first quarter of the game against Texas, the elbow of Texas's Lauren Ebo connected with Lopez Sénéchal's face. Ebo went to the foul line with the score 12–8 in favor of Texas. Lopez Sénéchal had to go to the locker room, where she received two stitches to close a cut. She did not play the remainder of the first half. She returned in the second half and almost immediately hit a three pointer. Texas won this first round match by a score of 70 to 52.

=== UConn ===
When Morgan Valley saw Lopez Sénéchal's name in the NCAA transfer portal, she had already heard the name "dozens of times". Fairfield is only an hour and 1/2 drive from the UConn campus, and Valley had discussions with a coach of a competing team about the challenges of stopping Lopez Sénéchal. When Valley saw the name in the portal, she immediately began doing some research viewing game films and reaching out to the Fairfield head coach, Joe Frager, to find out whether she would be a fit at UConn. Frager, who has known UConn coach Geno Auriemma for decades, "understood the demands of the Huskies program" and responded that she would be "more than fine at UConn". Valley shared the video clips with Auriemma and the rest of the UConn staff which led to zoom meetings with Lopez Sénéchal while the UConn coaches were in Minneapolis for the Final Four.

At Fairfield, virtually all the scoring plays were run through her. The initial expectations were that Lopez Sénéchal would play more of a reserve role, and it was important that she feel comfortable with this change. Her goals were to get a shot at playing pro, and she felt that even a reduced role at UConn would provide the visibility and competition that would help earn a spot on a WNBA roster. While Auriemma originally expected her to get some minutes, he upgraded his opinion after a few days of practice. "After the first five days, I pretty much said, 'Someone who was a starter isn't going to start this year,'" Auriemma said. "That's how impressive she was." With star guards Paige Bueckers and Azzi Fudd injured during Lopez Sénéchal's final year at UConn, Lopez Sénéchal became one of the team's top scorers, helping to carry the team all the way to the Final Four. She played over thirty minutes a game during the season and established herself as one of the leading shooting guards in the country.

== Professional career ==
The Dallas Wings selected Lopez Senechal during the 2023 WNBA Draft with the fifth overall pick. However, she did not play during the 2023 season due to a knee injury. She played during the 2024 season but saw limited minutes behind several other guards. She decided not to play during the 2025 season due to personal reasons.

== Career statistics ==
Legend
| GP | Games played | GS | Games started | MPG | Minutes per game | RPG | Rebounds per game |
| APG | Assists per game | SPG | Steals per game | BPG | Blocks per game | PPG | Points per game |
| TO | Turnovers per game | FG% | Field-goal percentage | 3P% | 3-point field-goal percentage | FT% | Free-throw percentage |
| **Bold** | Career best | ° | League leader |

=== WNBA ===
==== Regular season ====
Stats current through end of 2024 season

WNBA regular season statistics
| Year | Team | GP | GS | MPG | FG% | 3P% | FT% | RPG | APG | SPG | BPG | TO | PPG |
|---|---|---|---|---|---|---|---|---|---|---|---|---|---|
| 2023 | Did not play (injury) | | | | | | | | | | | | |
| 2024 | Dallas | 27 | 0 | 4.6 | .294 | .200 | .500 | 0.4 | 0.4 | 0.1 | 0.0 | 0.2 | 0.9 |
| **Career** | 1 year, 1 team | 27 | 0 | 4.6 | .294 | .200 | .500 | 0.4 | 0.4 | 0.1 | 0.0 | 0.2 | 0.9 |

=== College ===
NCAA statistics
| Year | Team | GP | GS | MPG | FG% | 3P% | FT% | RPG | APG | SPG | BPG | TO | PPG |
|---|---|---|---|---|---|---|---|---|---|---|---|---|---|
| 2018–19 | Fairfield | 22 | 22 | 30.5 | .414 | .328 | **.857** | 4.7 | **1.8** | **1.2** | 0.5 | 2.0 | 11.8 |
| 2019–20 | Fairfield | 30 | 30 | **34.3** | .431 | .392 | .856 | **5.7** | 1.6 | 1.0 | **0.8** | 2.3 | 15.5 |
| 2020–21 | Fairfield | 16 | 16 | 33.4 | .424 | .407 | .830 | 3.4 | 1.6 | 0.9 | 0.5 | 2.4 | 16.9 |
| 2021–22 | Fairfield | 31 | 31 | 34.0 | .449 | .409 | .800 | 4.6 | 1.1 | 1.0 | 0.4 | **1.9** | **19.5** |
| 2022–23 | UConn | **37** | **37** | 31.5 | **.476** | **.440** | .854 | 3.1 | 1.6 | 0.5 | 0.3 | 2.0 | 15.5 |
| **Career** | | 136 | 136 | 32.8 | .444 | .405 | .837 | 4.3 | 1.5 | 0.9 | 0.5 | 2.1 | 16.0 |

== Awards and honors ==
- MAAC Tournament MVP (2022)
- MAAC Player of the Year (2022)
- MAAC Rookie of the Year(2019)
- MAAC All-Academic Team (2020, 2021, 2022)
- First Team All-BIG EAST (2023)
- Big East All-Tournament team (2023)
