= Fairfield Stags basketball =

Fairfield Stags basketball may refer to either of the basketball teams that represent Fairfield University:

- Fairfield Stags men's basketball
- Fairfield Stags women's basketball
