= 2022 MAAC women's basketball tournament =

- Classification: Division I
- Season: 2021–22
- Teams: 11
- Site: Jim Whelan Boardwalk Hall; Atlantic City, New Jersey
- Champions: Fairfield Stags (4th title)
- Winning coach: Joe Frager (1st title)
- MVP: Lou Lopez Sénéchal (Fairfield)
- Television: ESPNews, ESPN+

2021–22 MAAC women's basketball standings
	Conf.				Overall
Team	W		L	PCT	W		L	PCT
Fairfield †	19	–	1	.950	25	–	7	.781
Quinnipiac	14	–	6	.700	21	–	12	.636
Manhattan	14	–	6	.700	21	–	11	.656
Niagara	11	–	9	.550	15	–	15	.500
Siena	10	–	10	.500	10	–	19	.345
Monmouth	9	–	11	.450	14	–	16	.467
Saint Peter's	9	–	11	.450	13	–	18	.419
Iona	8	–	12	.400	11	–	16	.407
Rider	7	–	13	.350	9	–	21	.300
Marist	6	–	14	.300	8	–	21	.276
Canisius	3	–	17	.150	6	–	25	.194
† 2022 MAAC tournament winner

The 2022 Metro Atlantic Athletic Conference women's basketball tournament was the women's postseason basketball tournament for the Metro Atlantic Athletic Conference (MAAC) for the 2021–22 NCAA Division I women's basketball season. The tournament was played March 8–12, 2022, at the Jim Whelan Boardwalk Hall in Atlantic City, New Jersey, for the third year in a row. The tournament winner, the Fairfield Stags, received the conference's automatic bid to the 2022 NCAA Division I women's basketball tournament.

== Seeds ==
All 11 teams in the conference participate in the tournament. The top five teams receive byes to the quarterfinals. Teams are seeded by record within the conference, with a tiebreaker system to seed teams with identical conference records.

Seed	School	Conference	Tiebreaker 1	Tiebreaker 2	Tiebreaker 3
1	Fairfield	19–1			
2	Quinnipiac	14–6	1–1 vs. Manhattan	0–2 vs. Fairfield	2–0 vs. Niagara
3	Manhattan	14–6	1–1 vs. Manhattan	0–2 vs. Fairfield	0–2 vs. Niagara
4	Niagara	11–9			
5	Siena	10–10			
6	Monmouth	9–11	1–1 vs. Saint Peter's	0–2 vs. Fairfield	2–0 vs. Quinnipiac
7	Saint Peter's	9–11	1–1 vs. Monmouth	0–2 vs. Fairfield	0–2 vs. Quinnipiac
8	Iona	8–12			
9	Rider	7–13			
10	Marist	6–14			
11	Canisius	3–17			

== Schedule ==
Session	Game	Time*	Matchup	Score	Television
First round – Tuesday, March 8
1	1	9:30 am	(8) Iona vs. (9) Rider	74–58	ESPN+
1	2	11:30 am	(7) Saint Peter's vs. (10) Marist	49–29	ESPN+
1	3	1:30 pm	(6) Monmouth vs. (11) Canisius	65–71	ESPN+
Quarterfinals – Wednesday, March 9
2	4	1:30 pm	(1) Fairfield vs. (8) Iona	69–56	ESPN+
2	5	3:30 pm	(2) Quinnipiac vs. (7) Saint Peter's	63–42	ESPN+
Quarterfinals – Thursday, March 10
3	6	12:00 pm	(3) Manhattan vs. (11) Canisius	61–49	ESPN+
3	7	2:30 pm	(4) Niagara vs. (5) Siena	60–59	ESPN+
Semifinals – Friday, March 11
4	8	11:00 am	(1) Fairfield vs. (4) Niagara	75–38	ESPN+
4	9	1:30 pm	(2) Quinnipiac vs. (3) Manhattan	59–72	ESPN+
Championship – Saturday, March 12
5	10	11:00 am	(1) Fairfield vs. (3) Manhattan	73–68	ESPNews/ESPN+
*Game times in ET. ()-Rankings denote tournament seeding.

== Bracket ==
First round Tuesday, March 8 ESPN+
8	Iona	74
9	Rider	58
7	Saint Peter's	49
10	Marist	29
6	Monmouth	65
11	Canisius	71

Quarterfinals; Wednesday/Thursday, March 9/10; ESPN+
1	Fairfield	69
8	Iona	56
4	Niagara	60
5	Siena	59
2	Quinnipiac	63
7	Saint Peter's	42
3	Manhattan	61
11	Canisius	49

Semifinals; Friday, March 11; ESPN+
1	Fairfield	75
4	Niagara	38
2	Quinnipiac	59
3	Manhattan	72

Championship; Saturday, March 12; ESPNews/ESPN+
1	Fairfield	73
3	Manhattan	68

* denotes number of overtimes

== All-championship team ==
2022 MAAC women's basketball all-championship team
- Sydney Lowery, Fairfield
- Dee Dee Davis, Manhattan
- Rachel Hakes, Fairfield
- Courtney Warley, Manhattan
- Angel Parker, Niagara
- Cur'Tiera Haywood, Quinnipiac
- ^{MVP} Lou Lopez Sénéchal, Fairfield

== See also ==
- 2022 MAAC men's basketball tournament
