= 2021–22 Jackson State Lady Tigers basketball team =

Intercollegiate basketball season

2021–22 Jackson State Tigers women's basketball

SWAC Regular Season Champions SWAC tournament champions

NCAA tournament, first round
- Conference: Southwestern Athletic Conference
- Record: 23-7 (18–0 SWAC)
- Head coach: Tomekia Reed (4th season)
- Assistant coaches: Lashonda Cousin; Jonathan Williams; Chase Campbell
- Home arena: Williams Assembly Center

2021–22 SWAC women's basketball standings
	Conf.				Overall
Team	W		L	PCT	W		L	PCT
Jackson State †	18	–	0	1.000	23	–	7	.767
Alabama A&M	13	–	5	.722	15	–	14	.517
Alabama State	12	–	6	.667	15	–	15	.500
Southern	11	–	7	.611	14	–	17	.452
Texas Southern	11	–	7	.611	11	–	15	.423
Prairie View A&M	10	–	8	.556	13	–	17	.433
Grambling State	10	–	8	.556	14	–	17	.452
Arkansas–Pine Bluff	9	–	9	.500	13	–	16	.448
Bethune–Cookman	5	–	13	.278	6	–	21	.222
Florida A&M	4	–	14	.222	3	–	25	.107
Mississippi Valley State	3	–	15	.167	4	–	22	.154
Alcorn State	2	–	16	.111	3	–	22	.120
† 2022 SWAC tournament winner

The 2021–22 Jackson State Lady Tigers basketball team represented Jackson State University during the 2021–22 NCAA Division I women's basketball season. The Tigers, led by fourth-year head coach Tomekia Reed, played their home games at the Williams Assembly Center and were members of the Southwestern Athletic Conference (SWAC).

They finished the season 23–7, 18–0 in SWAC play to win the regular season title. As the first seed in the SWAC tournament, they defeated Mississippi Valley State in the Quarterfinals, Grambling State in the semifinal and Alabama State in the final to win the tournament title. They received an automatic bid to the NCAA tournament and were the fourteen seed in the Spokane Regional. They were defeated in the first round by LSU to end their season.

== Previous season ==
The Tigers finished the regular season 18–6, 14–1 in SWAC play to win the regular season championship. As the first seed in the SWAC tournament, they defeated Arkansas-Pine Bluff in the quarterfinals, Southern in the semifinal, and Alabama State in the final to win their second consecutive championship. They received an automatic bid to the NCAA tournament and were the fifteen seed in the River Walk Regional. They were defeated in the first round by Baylor to end their season.

== Roster ==
2021–22 Jackson State Tigers women's basketball team
Players
Coaches

Pos.	#	Name	Height	Year	Hometown
F	0	Daja Woodard	6 ft 3 in (1.91 m)	RS Jr	Mobile, AL
G	1	Ti'Lan Boler	5 ft 11 in (1.8 m)	So	Meridian, MS
F	2	Miya Crump	6 ft 1 in (1.85 m)	RS Jr	Houston, TX
C	4	Ameshya Williams-Holliday	6 ft 4 in (1.93 m)	Sr	Gulfport, MS
G	10	Keshuna Luckett	5 ft 6 in (1.68 m)	Jr	Jackson, MS
G	12	Jariyah Covington	5 ft 5 in (1.65 m)	Sr	Starkville, MS
G	14	Aaliyah Mosley	5 ft 6 in (1.68 m)	Fr	Madison, MS
G	20	Areyanna Hunter	5 ft 6 in (1.68 m)	Fr	Louisville, MS
F	21	Lamiracle Sims	6 ft 1 in (1.85 m)	Sr	Moss Point, MS
F	23	Ja'Leah Hickmon	6 ft 0 in (1.83 m)	Fr	Newton, MS
G	24	Dayzsha Rogan	5 ft 4 in (1.63 m)	Sr	Ripley, MS
C	25	Alexis Roberts	6 ft 2 in (1.88 m)	Fr	Newton, MS
F	34	Kennedy Ransom	6 ft 2 in (1.88 m)	Fr	Flora, MS

Head coach

- Tomekia Reed (Southern Miss)

Assistant coach(es)

- LaShonda Cousin (Mississippi State)
- Jonathan Williams (Faulkner University)
- Chase Campbell (Paine College)

Legend

- (C) Team captain
- (S) Suspended
- (I) Ineligible
- (W) Walk-on
- Injured
- Current redshirt

Roster
Last update: May 31, 2022

== Schedule ==
Date time, TV	Rank^{#}	Opponent^{#}	Result	Record	Site (attendance) city, state
Non-conference regular season
November 9, 2021*; 4:00 p.m., ACCNX		at Miami (FL)	L 67–72	0–1	Watsco Center (1,102); Coral Gables, FL
November 16, 2021*; 6:00 p.m.		Nicholls State	W 75–59	1–1	Williams Assembly Center (250); Jackson, MS
November 23, 2021*; 2:00 p.m., SECN+		at Ole Miss	L 66–79	1–2	SJB Pavilion (1,642); Oxford, MS
December 1, 2021*; 7:00 p.m., LHN		at No. 15 Texas	L 64–78	1–3	Frank Erwin Center (2,127); Austin, TX
December 9, 2021*; 7:00 p.m., SECN+		at Arkansas	L 62–66	1–4	Bud Walton Arena (2,522); Fayetteville, AR
December 18, 2021*; 4:30 p.m.		vs. South Carolina State; Mississippi State Classic	W 97–37	2–4	Humphrey Coliseum (300); Starkville, MS
December 19, 2021*; 4:00 p.m., ESPN+		at Mississippi State; Mississippi State Classic	L 66–74	2–5	Humphrey Coliseum (5,736); Starkville, MS
December 20, 2021*; Noon		vs. Troy; Mississippi State Classic	L 82–99	2–6	Humphrey Coliseum (223); Starkville, MS
SWAC regular season
January 5, 2022; 5:30 p.m.		Alcorn State	W 75–49	3–6 (1–0)	Williams Assembly Center (603); Jackson, MS
January 8, 2022; 2:00 p.m.		at Alabama State	W 79–58	4–6 (2–0)	Dunn–Oliver Acadome (275); Montgomery, AL
January 10, 2022; 5:00 p.m.		at Alabama A&M	W 79–58	5–6 (3–0)	Alabama A&M Events Center (658); Huntsville, AL
January 15, 2022; 3:00 p.m.		Prairie View A&M	W 87–52	6–6 (4–0)	Williams Assembly Center (500); Jackson, MS
January 17, 2022; 4:00 p.m.		Texas Southern	W 92–68	7–6 (5–0)	Williams Assembly Center (350); Jackson, MS
January 22, 2022; 3:00 p.m.		at Bethune–Cookman	W 82–49	8–6 (6–0)	Moore Gymnasium (244); Daytona Beach, FL
January 24, 2022; 5:30 p.m.		at Florida A&M	W 90–34	9–6 (7–0)	Al Lawson Center; Tallahassee, FL
January 29, 2022; 3:00 p.m.		Grambling State	W 81–68	10–6 (8–0)	Williams Assembly Center (350); Jackson, MS
January 31, 2022; 5:30 p.m.		Southern	W 66–58	11–6 (9–0)	Williams Assembly Center (750); Jackson, MS
February 5, 2022; 3:00 p.m.		at Mississippi Valley State	W 88–54	12–6 (10–0)	Harrison HPER Complex (4,123); Itta Bena, MS
February 7, 2022; 5:30 p.m.		at Arkansas–Pine Bluff	W 69–55	13–6 (11–0)	K. L. Johnson Complex (1,542); Pine Bluff, AR
February 12, 2022; 3:00 p.m.		Florida A&M	W 88–49	14–6 (12–0)	Williams Assembly Center; Jackson, MS
February 14, 2022; 5:30 p.m.		Bethune-Cookman	W 83–64	15–6 (13–0)	Williams Assembly Center (1,118); Jackson, MS
February 19, 2022; 1:00 p.m.		at Alcorn State	W 65–44	16–6 (14–0)	Davey Whitney Complex (2,000); Lorman, MS
February 26, 2022; 5:30 p.m.		at Texas Southern	W 87–86	17–6 (15–0)	H&PE Arena (1,775); Houston, TX
February 28, 2022; 5:00 p.m.		at Prairie View A&M	W 91–76	18–6 (16–0)	William J. Nicks Building; Prairie View, TX
March 3, 2022; 5:30 p.m.		Arkansas-Pine Bluff	W 72–65	19–6 (17–0)	Williams Assembly Center (2,147); Jackson, MS
March 5, 2022; 3:00 p.m.		Mississippi Valley State	W 118–57	20–6 (18–0)	Williams Assembly Center; Jackson, MS
SWAC Tournament
March 9, 2022; 5:30 p.m., ESPN+	(1)	vs. (8) Arkansas-Pine Bluff; Quarterfinals	W 78–67	21–6	Bartow Arena (333); Birmingham, AL
March 11, 2022; 5:30 p.m., ESPN+	(1)	vs. (4) Southern; Semifinals	W 59–49	22–6	Bartow Arena (445); Birmingham, AL
March 12, 2022; 1:30 p.m., ESPN+	(1)	vs. (3) Alabama State; Final	W 101–80	23–6	Bartow Arena (670); Birmingham, AL
NCAA tournament
March 19, 2022; 4:00 p.m., ESPNU	(14 S)	at (3 S) No. 9 LSU; First Round	L 77–83	23–7	Maravich Assembly Center; Baton Rouge, LA
*Non-conference game. ^{#}Rankings from AP Poll. (#) Tournament seedings in parentheses. S=Spokane. All times are in Eastern Time.

== Rankings ==
Ranking movements Legend: — = Not ranked
	Week																		
Poll	Pre	1	2	3	4	5	6	7	8	9	10	11	12	13	14	15	16	17	Final
AP	—	—	—	—	—	—	—	—	—	—	—	—	—	—	—	—	—	—	—
Coaches	—	—	—	—	—	—	—	—	—	—	—	—	—	—	—	—	—	—	—

Legend
	Increase in ranking
	Decrease in ranking
	Not ranked previous week
(RV)	Received votes
(NR)	Not ranked and did not receive votes

The Coaches Poll did not release a Week 2 poll, and the AP Poll did not release a poll after the NCAA Tournament.
