= 2022 SWAC women's basketball tournament =

- Classification: Division I
- Season: 2021–22
- Teams: 8
- Site: Bartow Arena; Birmingham, Alabama
- Television: ESPN+,

The 2022 SWAC women's basketball tournament (officially known as the Cricket Wireless SWAC Basketball Tournament due to sponsorship reasons) was the postseason women's basketball tournament for the 2021–22 season in the Southwestern Athletic Conference (SWAC). The tournament was held from March 9 to 12, 2022. The tournament winner will receive an automatic invitation to the 2022 NCAA Division I women's basketball tournament.

2021–22 SWAC women's basketball standings
	Conf.				Overall
Team	W		L	PCT	W		L	PCT
Jackson State †	18	–	0	1.000	23	–	7	.767
Alabama A&M	13	–	5	.722	15	–	14	.517
Alabama State	12	–	6	.667	15	–	15	.500
Southern	11	–	7	.611	14	–	17	.452
Texas Southern	11	–	7	.611	11	–	15	.423
Prairie View A&M	10	–	8	.556	13	–	17	.433
Grambling State	10	–	8	.556	14	–	17	.452
Arkansas–Pine Bluff	9	–	9	.500	13	–	16	.448
Bethune–Cookman	5	–	13	.278	6	–	21	.222
Florida A&M	4	–	14	.222	3	–	25	.107
Mississippi Valley State	3	–	15	.167	4	–	22	.154
Alcorn State	2	–	16	.111	3	–	22	.120
† 2022 SWAC tournament winner

== Seeds ==
Teams are seeded by record within the conference, with a tie–breaker system to seed teams with identical conference records. Only the top eight teams in the conference qualified for the tournament.

Seed	School	Conference	Tiebreaker 1	Tiebreaker 2	Tiebreaker 3
1	Jackson State	18–0			
2	Alabama A&M	13–5			
3	Alabama State	12–6			
4	Southern	11–7	1-1 vs. Texas Southern	147-147 score vs. Texas Southern	0-1 vs. Jackson State
5	Texas Southern	11-7	1-1 vs. Southern	147-147 score vs. Southern	0-2 vs. Jackson State
6	Prairie View A&M	10-8	2-0 vs. Grambling State		
7	Grambling State	10-8	0–2 vs. Prairie View A&M		
8	Arkansas-Pine Bluff	9-9			
DNQ	Bethune-Cookman	5–13			
DNQ	Florida A&M	4–14			
DNQ	Mississippi Valley State	3–15			
DNQ	Alcorn State	2–16			

== Schedule ==
Game	Time*	Matchup^{#}	Score	Television
Quarterfinals – Wednesday, March 9, 2022
1	11:00 am	No. 2 Alabama A&M vs. No. 7 Grambling State	62–54	ESPN+
2	5:30 pm	No. 1 Jackson State vs. No. 8 Arkansas-Pine Bluff	78–67	ESPN+
Quarterfinals – Thursday, March 10, 2022
3	11:00 am	No. 3 Alabama State vs. No. 6 Prairie View A&M	60-58	ESPN+
4	5:30 pm	No. 4 Southern vs. No. 5 Texas Southern	68-67	ESPN+
Semifinals – Friday, March 11, 2022
5	11:00 am	No. 7 Grambling State vs. No. 3 Alabama State	59-74	ESPN+
6	5:30 pm	No. 1 Jackson State vs. No. 4 Southern	59-46	ESPN+
Championship – Saturday, March 12, 2022
7	1:30 pm	No. 1 Jackson State vs. No. 3 Alabama State	101–80	ESPN+
*Game times in CDT. #-Rankings denote tournament seeding.

== Bracket ==
Quarterfinals; March 9–10, 2022; ESPN+
1	Jackson State	78
8	Arkansas-Pine Bluff	67
4	Southern	68
5	Texas Southern	67
2	Alabama A&M	54
7	Grambling State	62
3	Alabama State	60
6	Prairie View A&M	58

Semifinals; March 11, 2022; ESPN+
1	Jackson State	59
4	Southern	46
7	Grambling State	59
3	Alabama State	74

Championship; March 12, 2022; ESPN+
1	Jackson State	101
3	Alabama State	80
