= 2022 ASUN women's basketball tournament =

- Classification: Division I
- Season: 2021–22
- Teams: 12
- Site: Campus sites
- Champions: Florida Gulf Coast (9th title)
- Winning coach: Karl Smesko (9th title)
- MVP: Kierstan Bell (FGCU)
- Television: ESPN+,

The 2022 ASUN women's basketball tournament was the conference postseason tournament for the ASUN Conference. This was the 43rd season in which the league has conducted a postseason tournament. The tournament was held March 2, 6, 9, and 12, 2022, at campus sites of the higher seeds. Florida Gulf Coast, winners of the conference's East Division and also with the best overall conference record, won the tournament and with it the conference's automatic bid to the NCAA tournament.

2021–22 ASUN women's basketball standings
	Conf.				Overall
Team	W		L	PCT	W		L	PCT
East
No. 23 Florida Gulf Coast †	15	–	1	.938	30	–	3	.909
Liberty	14	–	2	.875	28	–	5	.848
Stetson	11	–	5	.688	20	–	12	.625
Jacksonville	8	–	8	.500	16	–	13	.552
North Florida	5	–	11	.313	13	–	17	.433
Kennesaw State	5	–	11	.313	9	–	19	.321
West
Jacksonville State	13	–	3	.813	24	–	8	.750
North Alabama*	8	–	8	.500	13	–	16	.448
Eastern Kentucky	7	–	9	.438	15	–	16	.484
Lipscomb	5	–	11	.313	10	–	20	.333
Central Arkansas	4	–	12	.250	9	–	19	.321
Bellarmine*	1	–	15	.063	4	–	24	.143
* ineligible for the 2022 NCAA tournament due to transition from Division II
† 2022 ASUN Tournament winner Rankings from AP poll

== Seeds ==
All teams in the conference qualified for the tournament. Teams were seeded by their record in conference play, with a tiebreaker system to seed teams with identical conference records. The top two teams from each division received byes into the quarterfinals.

The two tiebreakers used by the ASUN are: 1) head-to-head record of teams with identical record and 2) NCAA NET Rankings available on day following the conclusion of ASUN regular-season play. These tiebreakers are also used to determine home court should teams with identical divisional seedings and conference records advance to the championship game (which happened in the 2022 ASUN men's tournament).

Seed	School	Conference	Tiebreaker
#1 East	Florida Gulf Coast	15–1	
#1 West	Jacksonville State	13–3	
#2 East	Liberty	14–2	
#2 West	North Alabama	8–8	
#3 East	Stetson	11–5	
#3 West	Eastern Kentucky	7–9	
#4 East	Jacksonville	8–8	
#4 West	Lipscomb	5–11	
#5 East	North Florida	5–11	Superior NET Ranking to Kennesaw State
#5 West	Central Arkansas	5–11	
#6 East	Kennesaw State	5–11	Lost NET to North Florida
#6 West	Bellarmine	1–15	

== Schedule ==
Game	Time	Matchup	Score	Television
First round – Wednesday, March 2 – Campus Sites
1	5:00 pm	W6 Bellarmine at E3 Stetson	53–81	ESPN+
2	6:00 pm	W5 Central Arkansas at E4 Jacksonville	55–65	ESPN+
3	6:00 pm	E6 Kennesaw State at W3 Eastern Kentucky	57–71	ESPN+
4	7:00 pm	E5 North Florida at W4 Lipscomb	60–42	ESPN+
Quarterfinals – Sunday, March 6– Campus Sites
5	1:00 pm	W3 Eastern Kentucky at E2 Liberty	57–77	ESPN+
6	1:00 pm	E5 North Florida at E1 Florida Gulf Coast	60–71	ESPN+
7	3:00 pm	E4 Jacksonville at W1 Jacksonville State	56–70	ESPN+
8	3:30 pm	E3 Stetson at W2 North Alabama	64–53	ESPN+
Semifinals – Wednesday, March 9 – Campus Sites
9	6:00 pm	E2 Liberty at W1 Jacksonville State	57–59	ESPN+
10	6:00 pm	E3 Stetson at E1 Florida Gulf Coast	67–82	ESPN+
Championship – Saturday, March 12 – Campus Sites
11	6:00 pm	W1 Jacksonville State at E1 Florida Gulf Coast	54-69	ESPN+
Game times in CT. Rankings denote tournament seed

== Bracket ==
If North Alabama or Bellarmine had won the ASUN Tournament, the conference's top overall seed, Florida Gulf Coast, would have claimed the automatic bid to the NCAA Tournament. However, both lost their first tournament games.

First round Wednesday, March 2, 2022; ESPN+
3W	Eastern Kentucky	71
6E	Kennesaw State	57
4E	Jacksonville	65
5W	Central Arkansas	55
3E	Stetson	81
6W	Bellarmine	53
4W	Lipscomb	42
5E	North Florida	60

Quarterfinals; Sunday, March 6, 2022; ESPN+
2E	Liberty	77
3W	Eastern Kentucky	57
1W	Jacksonville State	70
4E	Jacksonville	56
2W	North Alabama	53
3E	Stetson	64
1E	Florida Gulf Coast	71
5E	North Florida	60

Semifinals; Wednesday, March 9, 2022; ESPN+
2E	Liberty	57
1W	Jacksonville State	59
3E	Stetson	67
1E	Florida Gulf Coast	82

Championship game Saturday, March 12, 2022; ESPN+
1W	Jacksonville State	54
1E	Florida Gulf Coast	69
