= 2021–22 North Alabama Lions women's basketball team =

Intercollegiate basketball season

2021–22 North Alabama Lions women's basketball
- Conference: Atlantic Sun Conference
- Record: 13–16 (8–8 ASUN)
- Head coach: Missy Tiber (9th season)
- Assistant coaches: Adrianne Harlow; Josh Ashley; Ellen Holton
- Home arena: Flowers Hall

2021–22 ASUN women's basketball standings
	Conf.				Overall
Team	W		L	PCT	W		L	PCT
East
No. 23 Florida Gulf Coast †	15	–	1	.938	30	–	3	.909
Liberty	14	–	2	.875	28	–	5	.848
Stetson	11	–	5	.688	20	–	12	.625
Jacksonville	8	–	8	.500	16	–	13	.552
North Florida	5	–	11	.313	13	–	17	.433
Kennesaw State	5	–	11	.313	9	–	19	.321
West
Jacksonville State	13	–	3	.813	24	–	8	.750
North Alabama*	8	–	8	.500	13	–	16	.448
Eastern Kentucky	7	–	9	.438	15	–	16	.484
Lipscomb	5	–	11	.313	10	–	20	.333
Central Arkansas	4	–	12	.250	9	–	19	.321
Bellarmine*	1	–	15	.063	4	–	24	.143
† 2022 ASUN Tournament winner * ineligible for the 2022 NCAA tournament due to transition from Division II; Rankings from AP poll

The 2021–22 North Alabama Lions women's basketball team represented University of North Alabama during the 2021–22 NCAA Division I women's basketball season. They were led by ninth-year head coach Missy Tiber. The Lions played their home games at the Flowers Hall in Florence, Alabama as members of the Atlantic Sun Conference (ASUN).

This was North Alabama's final of a four-year transition period from Division II to Division I. As a result, the Lions were not eligible for NCAA postseason play but were eligible to participate in the ASUN tournament.

== Previous season ==
The Lions finished the 2020–21 season 7–18, 6–9 in ASUN play, to finish in sixth place in their conference. They advanced to the quarterfinals of the ASUN tournament.

== Roster ==
2021–22 North Alabama Lions women's basketball team
Players
Coaches

Pos.	#	Name	Height	Year	Previous school	Hometown
G	00	Kenley Woods	5 ft 7 in (1.7 m)	Fr	Coahulla Creek HS	Dalton, GA
G	2	Jada Moore	5 ft 7 in (1.7 m)	So	Whitfield HS	St. Louis, MO
G	4	Macey Lee	6 ft 0 in (1.83 m)	So	Trinity Christian Academy	Jackson, TN
G	12	Macie Walker	5 ft 9 in (1.75 m)	Fr	Belmont HS	Belmont, MS
G	13	Julia Strachan	5 ft 9 in (1.75 m)		Attleboro HS; Adelphi	North Attleboro, MA
G	15	Alexis Callins	5 ft 8 in (1.73 m)	So	Westview HS	Martin, TN
G	20	Olivia Jones	5 ft 10 in (1.78 m)	Fr	University School of Jackson	Jackson, TN
G	22	Patrycja Jaworska	5 ft 7 in (1.7 m)		High School of Agnieszka Osiecka; Texas A&M International	Wroclaw, Poland
G/F	23	Reagan Hune	5 ft 10 in (1.78 m)	Jr	Carmel HS; Palm Beach State College	Carmel, IN
G	24	Hina Suzuki	5 ft 3 in (1.6 m)	Sr	Osaka Toin Senior HS; Kwansei	Hamamatsu, Japan
G/F	32	Skylar Gill	5 ft 11 in (1.8 m)	Fr	Hardin County HS	Wichita, KS
F	33	Tiahna Sears	5 ft 10 in (1.78 m)		Bunbury Catholic College; UMass–Lowell	Bunbury, Australia

Head coach

- Missy Tiber (West Liberty)

Assistant coach(es)

- Adrianne Harlow (West Liberty)
- Josh Ashley (Tarleton State)
- Ellen Holton (Northern Kentucky)

Legend

- (C) Team captain
- (S) Suspended
- (I) Ineligible
- (W) Walk-on
- Injured
- Current redshirt

Roster
Last update: July 13, 2024

== Schedule ==
Date time, TV	Rank^{#}	Opponent^{#}	Result	Record	Site (attendance) city, state
Non-conference regular season
November 9, 2021*; 11:00 a.m., ESPN+		Blackburn College	W 114–52	1–0	Flowers Hall (973); Florence, AL
November 11, 2021*; 6:00 p.m., SECN+		at No. 13 Kentucky	L 56–98	1–1	Memorial Coliseum (3,321); Lexington, KY
November 16, 2021*; 6:00 p.m., ESPN+		at Austin Peay	L 58–74	1–2	Dunn Center (579); Clarksville, TN
November 20, 2021*; 1:00 p.m., ESPN+		Georgia State	W 91–90 ^{OT}	2–2	Flowers Hall (574); Florence, AL
November 23, 2021*; 5:30 p.m., ESPN+		Tennessee State	L 71–83	2–3	Flowers Hall (465); Florence, AL
November 29, 2021*; 6:00 p.m., ESPN+		Freed–Hardeman	L 62–71	2–4	Flowers Hall (215); Florence, AL
December 1, 2021*; 5:30 p.m., ESPN+		Oakwood	W 101–32	3–4	Flowers Hall (222); Florence, AL
December 11, 2021*; 7:00 p.m., ESPN+		Martin Methodist	W 67–53	4–4	Flowers Hall (296); Florence, AL
December 15, 2021*; 5:00 p.m., ESPN+		at Murray State	L 60–74	4–5	CFSB Center (521); Murray, KY
December 18, 2021*; 1:00 p.m., ESPN+		at Chattanooga	W 74–71	5–5	McKenzie Arena (941); Chattanooga, TN
December 21, 2021*; 10:00 a.m., BTN+		at Purdue	L 53–86	5–6	Mackey Arena (5,457); West Lafayette, IN
December 28, 2021*; 11:00 a.m.		at Saint Joseph's; The Hawk Classic	Canceled		Hagan Arena; Philadelphia, PA
December 29, 2021*; 11:00 a.m.		vs. Harvard/Norfolk State; The Hawk Classic	Canceled		Hagan Arena; Philadelphia, PA
December 30, 2021*; 6:00 p.m., ESPN+		Samford	L 75–78	5–7	Flowers Hall (339); Florence, AL
ASUN regular season
January 8, 2022; 5:30 p.m., ESPN+		Jacksonville State	L 69–73	5–8 (0–1)	Flowers Hall (669); Florence, AL
January 12, 2022; 6:00 p.m., ESPN+		Eastern Kentucky	W 88–86 ^{2OT}	6–8 (1–1)	Flowers Hall (449); Florence, AL
January 19, 2022; 5:30 p.m., ESPN+		at Bellarmine	W 72–48	7–8 (2–1)	Freedom Hall (183); Louisville, KY
January 22, 2022; 1:00 p.m., ESPN+		Stetson	L 43–75	7–9 (2–2)	Flowers Hall (487); Florence, AL
January 24, 2022; 2:00 p.m., ESPN+		at Central Arkansas	L 53–61	7–10 (2–3)	Farris Center (216); Conway, AR
January 27, 2022; 2:30 p.m., ESPN+		at Liberty	L 63–75	7–11 (2–4)	Liberty Arena (687); Lynchburg, VA
January 29, 2022; 1:00 p.m., ESPN+		at Kennesaw State	L 50–63	7–12 (2–5)	KSU Convocation Center (575); Kennesaw, GA
February 3, 2022; 5:30 p.m., ESPN+		Jacksonville	W 84–68	8–12 (3–5)	Flowers Hall (513); Florence, AL
February 5, 2022; 1:00 p.m., ESPN+		North Florida	W 70–65	9–12 (4–5)	Flowers Hall (648); Florence, AL
February 9, 2022; 4:00 p.m., ESPN+		at No. 22 Florida Gulf Coast	L 53–63	9–13 (4–6)	Alico Arena (1,601); Fort Myers, FL
February 12, 2022; 1:00 p.m., ESPN+		Bellarmine	W 81–59	10–13 (5–6)	Flowers Hall (465); Florence, AL
February 14, 2022; 3:00 p.m., ESPN+		at Lipscomb	W 76–68	11–13 (6–6)	Allen Arena (168); Nashville, TN
February 17, 2022; 4:00 p.m., ESPN+		at Eastern Kentucky	W 74–65	12–13 (7–6)	McBrayer Arena (311); Richmond, KY
February 19, 2022; 1:00 p.m., ESPN+		Lipscomb	L 59–70	12–14 (7–7)	Flowers Hall (786); Florence, AL
February 24, 2022; 6:00 p.m., ESPN+		Central Arkansas	W 78–50	13–14 (8–7)	Flowers Hall (540); Florence, AL
February 26, 2022; 3:15 p.m., ESPN+		at Jacksonville State	L 49–68	13–15 (8–8)	Pete Mathews Coliseum (1,179); Jacksonville, AL
Atlantic Sun tournament
March 6, 2022; 3:30 p.m., ESPN+	(2W)	(3E) Stetson; Quarterfinals	L 53–64	13–16	Flowers Hall (628); Florence, AL
*Non-conference game. ^{#}Rankings from AP poll. (#) Tournament seedings in parentheses. All times are in Central.
