= 2021–22 Florida Gulf Coast Eagles women's basketball team =

American college basketball season

2021–22 Florida Gulf Coast Eagles women's basketball
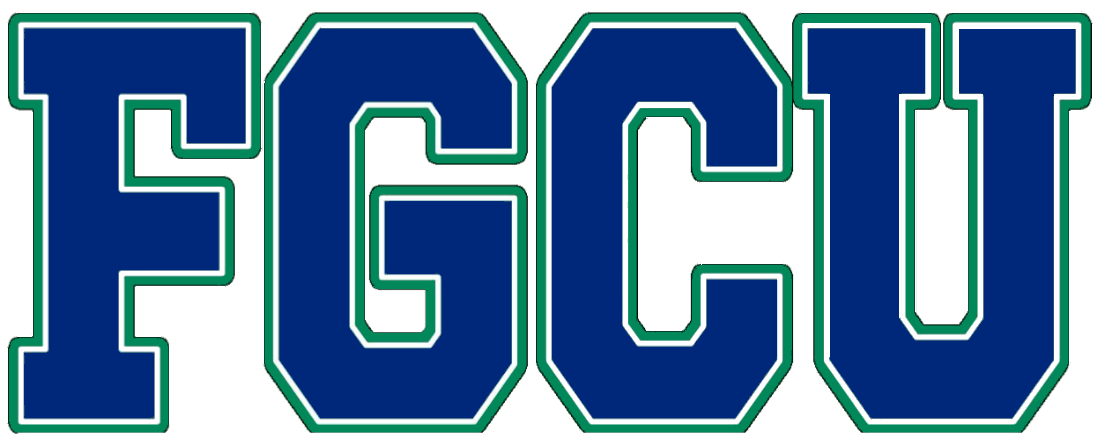

ASUN regular season champions ASUN tournament champions

NCAA tournament, second round
- Conference: ASUN

Ranking
- Coaches: No. 20
- AP: No. 23
- Record: 30–3 (15–1 ASUN)
- Head coach: Karl Smesko (20th season)
- Assistant coaches: Chelsea Lyles; Shannon Murphy; Mandi Pierce
- Home arena: Alico Arena

2021–22 ASUN women's basketball standings
	Conf.				Overall
Team	W		L	PCT	W		L	PCT
East
No. 23 Florida Gulf Coast †	15	–	1	.938	30	–	3	.909
Liberty	14	–	2	.875	28	–	5	.848
Stetson	11	–	5	.688	20	–	12	.625
Jacksonville	8	–	8	.500	16	–	13	.552
North Florida	5	–	11	.313	13	–	17	.433
Kennesaw State	5	–	11	.313	9	–	19	.321
West
Jacksonville State	13	–	3	.813	24	–	8	.750
North Alabama*	8	–	8	.500	13	–	16	.448
Eastern Kentucky	7	–	9	.438	15	–	16	.484
Lipscomb	5	–	11	.313	10	–	20	.333
Central Arkansas	4	–	12	.250	9	–	19	.321
Bellarmine*	1	–	15	.063	4	–	24	.143
† 2022 ASUN Tournament winner * ineligible for the 2022 NCAA tournament due to transition from Division II; Rankings from AP poll

The 2021–22 Florida Gulf Coast Eagles women's basketball team represented Florida Gulf Coast University during the 2021–22 NCAA Division I women's basketball season. The Eagles, led by twentieth-year head coach Karl Smesko, played their home games at the Alico Arena and were members of the Atlantic Sun Conference (ASUN).

They finished the season 30–3, 15–1 in ASUN play, to win the ASUN regular season. They were the first seed in the ASUN tournament, and they defeated North Florida, Liberty and Jacksonville State to win the tournament championship and earn the conference's automatic berth in the NCAA tournament. In the tournament, they defeated Virginia Tech before falling to Maryland in the second round to end their season.

== Roster ==
2021–22 Florida Gulf Coast Eagles women's basketball team
Players
Coaches

Pos.	#	Name	Height	Year	Previous school	Hometown
G	0	Kaela Webb	5 ft 6 in (1.68 m)	Sr	Detroit Country Day; Providence	Pontiac, MI
G	1	Kierstan Bell	6 ft 1 in (1.85 m)	Jr	Canton McKinley; Ohio State	Alliance, OH
G	3	Andrea Cecil	6 ft 1 in (1.85 m)	GS	Oak Harbor; Bowling Green	Oak Harbor, OH
G	4	Tishara Morehouse	5 ft 3 in (1.6 m)	Sr	Rufus King; Western Nebraska	Milwaukee, WI
G	5	Aaliyah Stanley	5 ft 6 in (1.68 m)	Jr	Oxbridge Academy; Eastern Michigan	Boynton Beach, FL
G	10	Kendall Spray	5 ft 7 in (1.7 m)	GS	Wilson Central; Clemson	Nashville, TN
G/F	11	Maddie Antenucci	5 ft 10 in (1.78 m)	So	Indian Hill	Cincinnati, OH
G	13	Kerstie Phills	5 ft 9 in (1.75 m)	GS	Charlotte Christian; Wagner	Charlotte, NC
G	15	Tyra Cox	5 ft 8 in (1.73 m)	RS Sr	Lake Highland Prep; William & Mary	Orlando, FL
G/F	20	Tanner Bryant	5 ft 11 in (1.8 m)	Sr	Miami Trace	Washington Court House, OH
G	21	Kierra Adams	6 ft 0 in (1.83 m)	RS So	Brookwood	Lawrenceville, GA
G	23	Karli Seay	5 ft 7 in (1.7 m)	GS	Homewood-Flossmoor; Western Nebraska	Flossmoor, IL
G	24	Seneca Jackley	5 ft 9 in (1.75 m)	So	St. Mary's	Colorado Springs, CO
G	31	Milan Schimmel	5 ft 8 in (1.73 m)	Sr	Nixyaawii; Hutchinson	Mission, OR
G	32	Emma List	5 ft 10 in (1.78 m)	RS Sr	Discovery Canyon; Albany	Colorado Springs, CO
G		Brylee Bartram	5 ft 8 in (1.73 m)	Jr	Seffner; Vanderbilt	Tampa, FL

Head coach

- Karl Smesko (Kent State)

Assistant coach(es)

- Chelsea Lyles (Florida Gulf Coast)
- Shannon Murphy (Florida Gulf Coast)
- Mandi Pierce (St. Bonaventure)

Legend

- (C) Team captain
- (S) Suspended
- (I) Ineligible
- (W) Walk-on
- Injured
- Current redshirt

Roster
Last update: April 1, 2022

== Schedule ==
Date time, TV	Rank^{#}	Opponent^{#}	Result	Record	Site (attendance) city, state
Non-conference regular season
November 9, 2021*; 5:00 p.m.		Florida Memorial	W 105–41	1–0	Alico Arena (1,063); Fort Myers, FL
November 12, 2021*; 6:00 p.m.		Temple	W 70–53	2–0	Alico Arena (1,697); Fort Myers, FL
November 14, 2021*; 1:30 p.m.		at LSU	W 88–74	3–0	Pete Maravich Assembly Center (6,097); Baton Rouge, LA
November 19, 2021*; 11:00 a.m.		vs. Manhattan; ASUN/MAAC Challenge	W 88–57	4–0	HP Field House (212); Orlando, FL
November 20, 2021*; Noon		vs. Fairfield; ASUN/MAAC Challenge	W 83–61	5–0	HP Field House (203); Orlando, FL
November 26, 2021*; 4:45 p.m.	No. 25	vs. Tennessee Tech; San Juan Shootout	W 81–69	6–0	Roberto Clemente Coliseum (200); San Juan, PR
November 27, 2021*; 4:45 p.m.	No. 25	vs. Saint Louis; San Juan Shootout	W 73–65	7–0	Roberto Clemente Coliseum (200); San Juan, PR
December 1, 2021*; 7:00 p.m.	No. 22	Princeton	L 55–58	7–1	Alico Arena (2,045); Fort Myers, FL
December 9, 2021*; 7:00 p.m.		Palm Beach Atlantic	W 80–52	8–1	Alico Arena (1,282); Fort Myers, FL
December 11, 2021*; 7:00 p.m.		Ave Maria	W 99–37	9–1	Alico Arena (1,372); Fort Myers, FL
December 20, 2021*; 11:00 a.m.		vs. Michigan State; West Palm Beach Invitational	W 85–84 ^{2OT}	10–1	Massimino Court (0); West Palm Beach, FL
December 21, 2021*; 1:15 p.m.		vs. High Point; West Palm Beach Invitational	W 86–50	11–1	Massimino Court (0); West Palm Beach, FL
December 29, 2021*; 2:00 p.m.		at Fordham	Canceled		Rose Hill Gymnasium; The Bronx, NY
ASUN Regular Season
January 5, 2022; 5:00 p.m.		North Florida	W 88–57	12–1 (1–0)	Alico Arena (1,474); Fort Myers, FL
January 9, 2022; 5:00 p.m.		at Jacksonville	W 83–64	13–1 (2–0)	Swisher Gymnasium (60); Jacksonville, FL
January 12, 2022; 7:00 p.m.		at Kennesaw State	W 100–65	14–1 (3–0)	KSU Convocation Center (733); Kennesaw, GA
January 15, 2022; 4:00 p.m.		Liberty	W 73–69	15–1 (4–0)	Alico Arena (1,737); Fort Myers, FL
January 19, 2022; 7:00 p.m.	No. 23	at Stetson	W 78–41	16–1 (5–0)	Edmunds Center (402); DeLand, FL
January 22, 2022; 2:45 p.m.	No. 23	at Jacksonville State	W 66–44	17–1 (6–0)	Pete Mathews Coliseum (980); Jacksonville, AL
January 27, 2022; 7:30 p.m.		Eastern Kentucky	W 92–70	18–1 (7–0)	Alico Arena (2,188); Fort Myers, FL
January 29, 2022; 4:00 p.m.		Bellarmine	W 98–66	19–1 (8–0)	Alico Arena (2,047); Fort Myers, FL
February 3, 2022; 6:30 p.m.	No. 22	at Central Arkansas	W 71–44	20–1 (9–0)	Farris Center (305); Conway, AR
February 5, 2022; 2:30 p.m.	No. 22	at Lipscomb	W 73–55	21–1 (10–0)	Allen Arena (523); Nashville, TN
February 9, 2022; 5:00 p.m.	No. 22	North Alabama	W 63–53	22–1 (11–0)	Alico Arena (1,601); Fort Myers, FL
February 12, 2022; 7:00 p.m.	No. 22	Stetson	L 55–58	22–2 (11–1)	Alico Arena (2,076); Fort Myers, FL
February 17, 2022; 7:00 p.m.	No. 25	Kennesaw State	W 64–48	23–2 (12–1)	Alico Arena (1,544); Fort Myers, FL
February 19, 2022; 2:00 p.m.	No. 25	at North Florida	W 63–52	24–2 (13–1)	UNF Arena (471); Jacksonville, FL
February 24, 2022; 7:00 p.m.	No. 24	at Liberty	W 69–61	25–2 (14–1)	Liberty Arena (1,631); Lynchburg, VA
February 26, 2022; 4:00 p.m.	No. 24	Jacksonville	W 78–55	26–2 (15–1)	Alico Arena (2,031); Fort Myers, FL
Atlantic Sun Tournament
March 6, 2022; 2:00 p.m., ESPN+	(1E) No. 22	(5E) North Florida; Quarterfinals	W 71–60	27–2	Alico Arena (1,388); Fort Myers, FL
March 9, 2022; 7:00 p.m., ESPN+	(1E) No. 22	(3E) Stetson; Semifinals	W 82–67	28–2	Alico Arena (1,520); Fort Myers, FL
March 2022; 7:00 p.m., ESPN+	(1E) No. 22	(1W) Jacksonville State; Final	W 69–54	29–2	Alico Arena (2,505); Fort Myers, FL
NCAA tournament
March 18, 2022; 2:30 p.m., ESPNU	(12S) No. 23	(5S) No. 16 Virginia Tech; First round	W 84–81	30–2	Xfinity Center; College Park, MD
March 20, 2022; 3:00 p.m., ESPN	(12S) No. 23	(4S) No. 13 Maryland; Second round	L 65–89	30–3	Xfinity Center (4,575); College Park, MD
*Non-conference game. ^{#}Rankings from AP poll. (#) Tournament seedings in parentheses. S=Spokane. All times are in Eastern.

== Rankings ==
+ Regular season polls	Poll	Pre- Season	Week 2	Week 3	Week 4	Week 5	Week 6	Week 7	Week 8	Week 9	Week 10	Week 11	Week 12	Week 13	Week 14	Week 15	Week 16	Week 17	Week 18	Final
AP	RV	RV	25	22	RV	RV	RV	RV	RV	RV	24	RV	22	22	25	24	22	23	23	
Coaches	RV	RV	22	RV	RV	25	RV	RV	23	21	20	20	20	22	23	22	20	20		

Legend
	Increase in ranking
	Decrease in ranking
	Not ranked previous week
(RV)	Received votes

The Coaches Poll releases a final poll after the NCAA tournament, but the AP poll does not release a poll at this time. The Coaches Poll does not release a week 2 poll.
