= Fairfield Stags women's basketball =

Women's college basketball team

Fairfield Stags
2025–26 Fairfield Stags women's basketball team
- University: Fairfield University
- Head coach: Carly Thibault-DuDonis (4th season)
- Location: Fairfield, Connecticut
- Arena: Leo D. Mahoney Arena (capacity: 3,500)
- Conference: MAAC (CAA beginning 2027)
- Nickname: Stags
- Colors: Red

NCAA Division I tournament appearances
- 1988, 1991, 1998, 2001, 2022, 2024, 2025, 2026

Conference tournament champions
- 1988, 1991, 1998, 2022, 2024, 2025, 2026

Conference regular-season champions
- 1990, 1991, 2000, 2022, 2024, 2025, 2026

Uniforms
Home	Away

The Fairfield Stags women's basketball team is the basketball team that represents Fairfield University in Fairfield, Connecticut and competes in the Metro Atlantic Athletic Conference of NCAA Division I.

== History ==
Fairfield began play in 1973, with the first varsity season being in 1974, and the first Division I season being in 1981. They have won the MAAC title in 1988, 1991, and 1998, with regular season titles in 1990, 1991

== Roster ==
2024–25 Fairfield Stags women's basketball team
Players
Coaches

Pos.	#	Name	Height	Year	Previous school	Hometown
G	0	Jillian Huerter	6 ft 0 in (1.83 m)	So	Rutgers	Clifton Park, New York
G	1	Kendall McGruder	5 ft 9 in (1.75 m)	Sr	North Texas	Grand Prairie, Texas
G	3	Janelle Brown	5 ft 6 in (1.68 m)	GS	Longwood High School	Middle Island, New York
G	4	Kaety L'Amoreaux	5 ft 6 in (1.68 m)	So	Maine-Endwell High School	Endwell, New York
F	5	Meghan Andersen	6 ft 1 in (1.85 m)	So	Our Lady of Mercy Academy	Wantagh, New York
G	6	Izabela Nicoletti Leite	5 ft 10 in (1.78 m)	GS	Florida State	Americana, São Paulo, Brazil
G	7	Keyarah Gregory	5 ft 3 in (1.6 m)	Fr	Fort Erie International Academy	Pickering, Ontario
F	11	Karly Fischer	6 ft 2 in (1.88 m)	So	Albertus Magnus High School	Tappan, New York
F	13	Cyanne Coe	6 ft 0 in (1.83 m)	Fr	Capital Courts Academy	Bolton, Ontario
F	15	Lauren Beach	6 ft 1 in (1.85 m)	Sr	Medway High School	Medway, Massachusetts
G	22	Casey Prior	5 ft 7 in (1.7 m)	So	Red Bank Catholic High School	Sea Girt, New Jersey
F	23	Emina Selimovic	5 ft 10 in (1.78 m)	Sr	Siena	Erie, Pennsylvania
G	25	Sydni Scott	5 ft 8 in (1.73 m)	Jr	Marshall	Prospect Park, Pennsylvania
G	31	Julia Karpell	5 ft 11 in (1.8 m)	Fr	St. John Vianney High School	Holmdel, New Jersey
F	44	Raiana Brown	6 ft 0 in (1.83 m)	GS	Texas A&M International	Wheatley Heights, New York

Head coach

- Carly Thibault-DuDonis (Monmouth)

Assistant coach(es)

- Erik Johnson (UC San Diego)
- Erika Brown (Delaware)
- Blake DuDonis (Gardner–Webb)
- Alex McKinnon (Montclair State)

Legend

- (C) Team captain
- (S) Suspended
- (I) Ineligible
- (W) Walk-on
- Injured
- Current redshirt

Roster
Last update: February 15, 2025

== Postseason ==
=== NCAA Tournament appearances ===
The Stags have made the NCAA Division I women's basketball tournament eight times. They have a record of 0–8.

Year	Round	Opponent	Result
1988	First Round	St. John's	L 70–83
1991	First Round	Providence	L 87–88
1998	First Round	Connecticut	L 52–93
2001	First Round	Utah	L 78–98
2022	First Round	Texas	L 52–70
2024	First Round	Indiana	L 56–89
2025	First Round	Kansas State	L 41–85
2026	First Round	Notre Dame	L 60–79

=== WNIT appearances ===
The Stags have made the Women's National Invitation Tournament twice. They have a record of 0–2.

Year	Round	Opponent	Result
2000	First Round	Wisconsin	L 46–82
2012	First Round	Drexel	L 41–57

=== WBI appearances ===
The Stags have made four appearances in the Women's Basketball Invitational. They have a record of 4–4.

Year	Round	Opponent	Result
2010	First Round; Quarterfinals	Towson; Appalachian State	W 69–55; L 36–59
2013	First Round; Quarterfinals	St. Francis; Penn	W 71–51; L 48–49
2014	First Round; Quarterfinals; Semifinals	Bryant; Maine; UIC	W 90–86; W 63–50; L 44–74
2016	First Round	UMBC	L 49–61
