= 2022 NCAA Division I women's basketball championship game =

Women's basketball championship game

2022 NCAA tournament championship game
National championship game
UConn Huskies	South Carolina Gamecocks
Big East	SEC
(30–5)	(34–2)
49	64
Head coach: Geno Auriemma	Head coach: Dawn Staley
- AP: 5
- Coaches: 6
- AP: 1
- Coaches: 1
	1	2	3	4	Total
UConn Huskies	8	19	10	12	49
South Carolina Gamecocks	22	13	11	18	64
- Date: April 3, 2022
- Venue: Target Center, Minneapolis, Minnesota
- MVP: Aliyah Boston, South Carolina
- Favorite: South Carolina by 4.5
- Attendance: 18,304
- National anthem: Dayna Koehn

United States TV coverage
- Network: ESPN
- Announcers: Ryan Ruocco (play-by-play); Rebecca Lobo (analyst); Holly Rowe (sideline); Andraya Carter (sideline)
- Nielsen Ratings: 0.91 (4.47 million)

The 2022 NCAA Division I women's basketball championship game was the final game of the 2022 NCAA Division I women's basketball tournament. It determined the national champion for the 2021–22 season and was contested by the UConn Huskies and the South Carolina Gamecocks. The game was played on April 3, 2022, at the Target Center in Minneapolis, Minnesota. In the game, the Gamecocks jumped out to an 18-point lead early in the second quarter and held off UConn scoring runs to win the national championship, 64–49. South Carolina's Aliyah Boston was voted the NCAA Tournament Most Outstanding Player (MOP). This was UConn's first loss in the women's national championship game.

== Participants ==
=== South Carolina ===
The Gamecocks, who represent the University of South Carolina and play their home games at Colonial Life Arena in Columbia, came to the championship game after being ranked No. 1 in every poll from the preseason through this matchup, the final game of the year. Led by coach of the year Dawn Staley and player of the year Aliyah Boston, South Carolina defeated a healthy UConn team in November's Battle 4 Atlantis tournament final, 73–57.

South Carolina lost only two games during the season: one in overtime against unranked Missouri in December, and one in the SEC Tournament, where the unranked Kentucky Wildcats surprised the Gamecocks in the finals. In the NCAA Tournament, South Carolina drew a No. 1 seed in the Greensboro Regional, where they won handily against Howard and Miami on their home court, then defeated a scrappy No. 5 seed North Carolina team. They then dominated Cinderella No. 10 seed Creighton in Greensboro to advance to the Final Four. The Gamecocks defeated Louisville, who never led after the second quarter, to advance to their second consecutive March Madness finals.

The Gamecocks entered this game with no injuries which affected their lineup.

=== UConn ===
The Huskies, who represent the University of Connecticut in Storrs, Connecticut, and split their home games between Gampel Pavilion and XL Center, came to the finals after a 30–5 season, an uncharacteristic year in which eight different players suffered injuries which kept them out of two or more games. UConn started the season ranked No. 2 behind the Gamecocks. Coached by Hall of Famers Geno Auriemma and Chris Dailey and led by last year's player of the year Paige Bueckers, UConn utilized eleven different starting lineups; eight different players led the Huskies in scoring in games during the season. In December, Bueckers suffered a broken bone in her knee, which kept her out of play for nineteen games, but she rejoined the team in late February with limited minutes until the NCAA Tournament. Bueckers's injury gave Auriemma and Dailey unexpected opportunities to develop blue-chip freshmen as scorers, while three seniors and several experienced sophomores anchored the team.

UConn lost regular season games against unranked Georgia Tech, Oregon, and Villanova, while losing to No. 6 Louisville in December. A healthy UConn dominated the Big East Tournament, defeating Villanova in the finals. In the NCAA Tournament, the No. 2 seed Huskies beat Mercer and struggled on their home court against a physical UCF team. At the Bridgeport regional, UConn defeated Indiana, then emerged victorious in a game that announcers called an "instant classic", a two-overtime 91–87 contest against No. 1 seed NC State. In a Final Four contest against Stanford, UConn out-rebounded the taller Cardinal squad and the Huskies' stifling defense held the defending national champions to a 34.8% shooting percentage to advance to this final with a 63–58 win.

Senior forward Dorka Juhász suffered a wrist injury during the NC State contest and was the only starter injured for this contest.

== Starting lineups ==
UConn	Position	South Carolina
Olivia Nelson-Ododa	F	Aliyah Boston
Aaliyah Edwards	F	Victaria Saxton
Christyn Williams	G	Zia Cooke
Azzi Fudd	G	Brea Beal
Paige Bueckers	G	Destanni Henderson

== Game summary ==
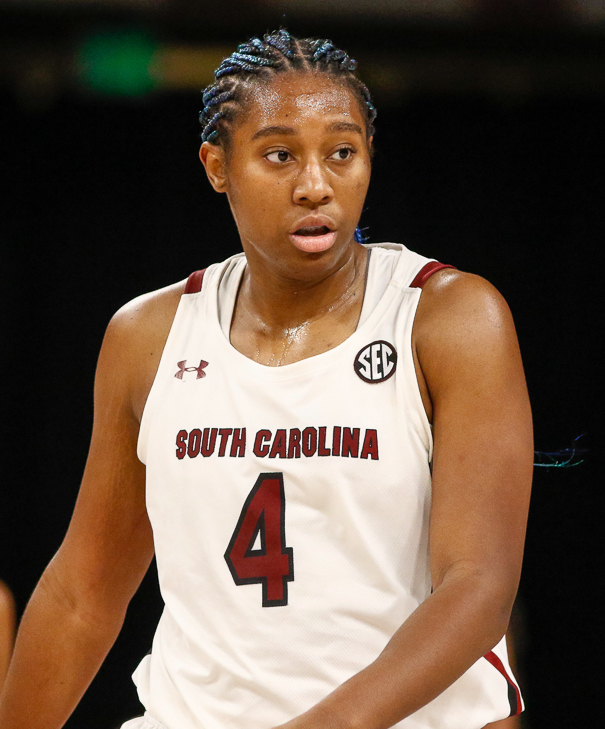
Aliyah Boston of South Carolina was named the NCAA Tournament MOP.

South Carolina jumped out to a 5–0 lead, and held a nine-point lead by the first timeout in the game, three and a half minutes into the contest. The Gamecocks already had seven second-chance points and eight rebounds. Aliyah Boston made a jump shot with 19 seconds to go in the first quarter, giving the Gamecocks a 22–8 lead. South Carolina had seven offensive rebounds in the quarter and held a 12–3 edge in rebounds.

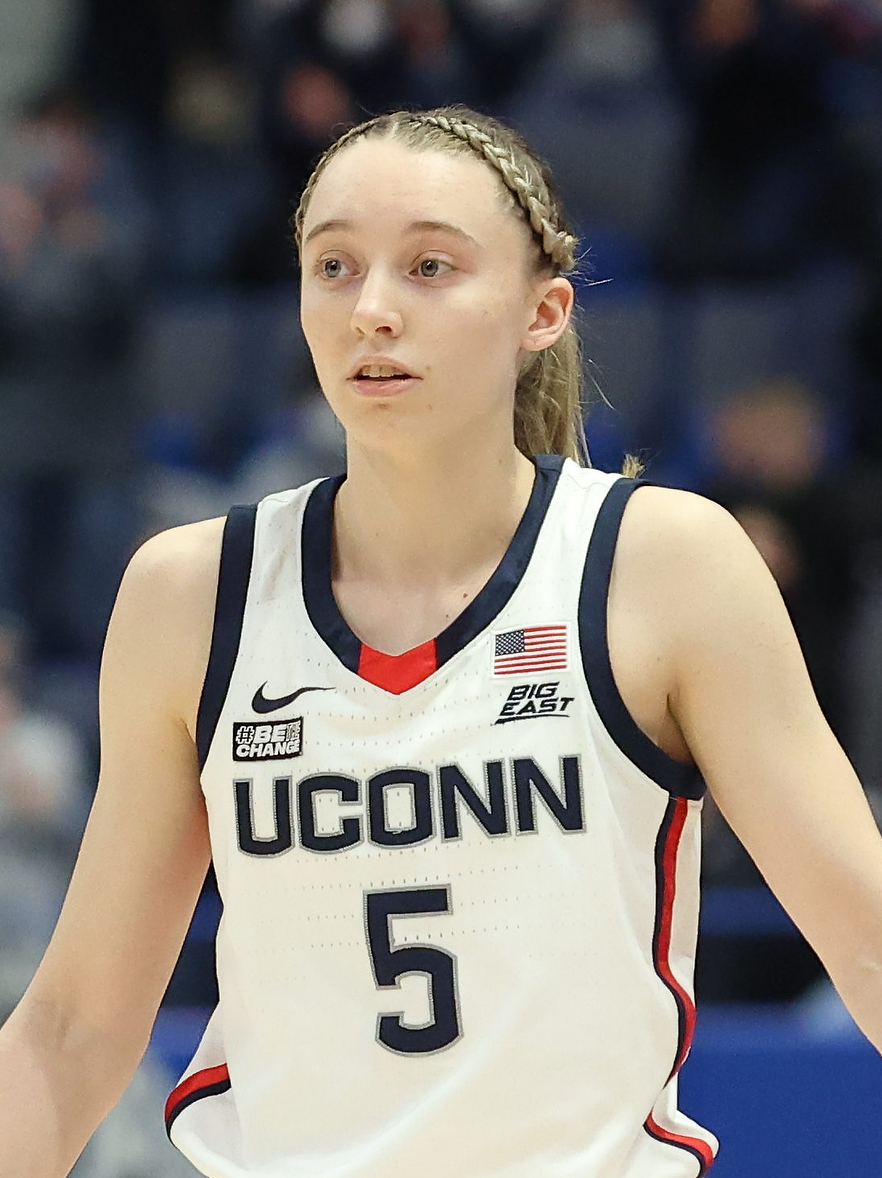
Paige Bueckers led UConn in scoring with 14 points.

One minute passed in the second quarter before Destanni Henderson scored its first points on a three-pointer, as in the first quarter. UConn followed with two jump shots and the Gamecocks made a layup before Henderson scored another three-pointer with 7:38 to play, extending the Gamecocks' lead to 18 points. A pair of shots by Paige Bueckers narrowed the deficit to 16 with seven minutes left, and the Huskies further made up ground after Bueckers made one of her two free throws with just over five minutes left. A minute-long scoring drought by both teams was broken with 4:01 by Caroline Ducharme, though another scoring drought of nearly two minutes followed. This was again broken by a Ducharme layup, which narrowed the South Carolina lead to single digits for the first time since the score was 13–4 with four minutes remaining in the first quarter. Evina Westbrook and Henderson traded layups and Bueckers made a jump shot, which narrowed the deficit to seven points, and a free throw by Saniya Rivers with 23 seconds left bumped the lead to eight. This would be the final scoring play of the first half, and the Gamecocks took a 35–27 lead to the locker room.

UConn began the second half with the ball, but two missed shots resulted in no points from their first possession. Boston opened the second half scoring with a layup 54 seconds into the half, and South Carolina's lead was pushed to eleven points with a free throw from Zia Cooke just under two minutes later. Boston made one of two free throws with 6:19 to play and Henderson made both of hers six seconds later, and Cooke scored a layup with 5:18 on the clock, extending the Gamecocks' lead to sixteen points as a result of their 8–0 run. This run was broken seconds later by Bueckers, who scored a jump shot with an assist from Nika Mühl. Over two minutes passed with no scoring before Edwards scored a layup with 2:41. UConn continued their scoring run with three-point shots from Ducharme and Westbrook, and their 10–0 streak cut the Gamecocks' lead to six points. Henderson made a free throw and a jump shot in the quarter's final minute, giving South Carolina a nine-point lead at the conclusion of the third quarter.

Edwards began the scoring in the fourth quarter for UConn, which was countered by a pair of layups by Henderson. Victaria Saxton made two free throws with just under seven minutes to play, and Ducharme made a layup to bring the lead down to eleven. A free throw from Boston and a jumper and layup from Henderson pushed the lead to sixteen points. Azzi Fudd and Bueckers made three-pointers for UConn with 4:09 and 3:23 to play, respectively, which brought the lead to within ten points for the final time. UConn began fouling around this time, as the game's next five points were scored on free throws by Henderson, Saxton, and Hall. UConn's final points of the contest would come with 1:51 to play, as Williams made a layup to make it 62–49. From there, Boston would score two free throws with 1:15 remaining before the Gamecocks would be able to run the clock out and claim their second national championship, 64–49.

Boston finished with 11 points and a team-high 16 rebounds for her Division I-high 30th double-double of the season. She was named the tournament's MOP. South Carolina outrebounded UConn by 25, one of the largest margins in the championship game's history. Bueckers had 14 points and six rebounds for UConn.

ESPN

April 3, 2022
7:00 p.m. CDT

Box score

No. 2 UConn Huskies 49, No. 1 South Carolina Gamecocks 64
Scoring by quarter: 8–22, 19–13, 10–11, 12–18
Pts: P. Bueckers – 14; Rebs: P. Bueckers – 6 Asts: C. Williams, N. Mühl – 3	Pts: D. Henderson – 26; Rebs: A. Boston – 16; Asts: D. Henderson – 4

Target Center – Minneapolis, Minnesota
Attendance: 18,304
Referees: Maj Forsberg, Michol Murray, Michael McConnell

Starters:			Pts	Reb	Ast
F	3	Aaliyah Edwards	8	2	2
F	20	Olivia Nelson-Ododa	4	2	1
G	35	Azzi Fudd	3	1	0
G	5	Paige Bueckers	14	6	2
G	13	Christyn Williams	2	1	3
Reserves:					
G	42	Amari Deberry	0	0	0
G	33	Caroline Ducharme	9	1	1
G	10	Nika Mühl	2	2	3
G	22	Evina Westbrook	7	4	2
Head coach:
Geno Auriemma

UConn	South Carolina

UConn	Statistics	South Carolina
22/54 (41%)	Field goals	22/60 (37%)
4/16 (25%)	3-pt field goals	3/16 (19%)
1/4 (25%)	Free throws	17/26 (65%)
6	Offensive rebounds	21
18	Defensive rebounds	28
24	Total rebounds	49
14	Assists	9
15	Turnovers	14
4	Steals	6
5	Blocks	4
21	Fouls	11

Starters:			Pts	Reb	Ast
F	4	Aliyah Boston	11	16	3
F	5	Victaria Saxton	6	5	0
G	12	Brea Beal	2	4	1
G	1	Zia Cooke	11	5	0
G	3	Destanni Henderson	26	2	4
Reserves:					
F	15	Laeticia Amihere	2	1	0
C	10	Kamilla Cardoso	4	3	1
G	23	Bree Hall	1	3	0
F	44	Saniya Rivers	1	0	0
F	2	Eniya Russell	0	0	0
G	24	Lele Grissett	0	2	0
Head coach:
Dawn Staley

== Media coverage ==
The championship game was televised in the United States by ESPN. The game was the most-viewed women's national championship broadcast since 2004, as it drew an average viewership of 4.85 million, with a peak viewership of 5.91 million. This reflected an 18% increase in viewership over the previous season's title game. It was also the most-watched ESPN college basketball broadcast since 2008.

== See also ==
- 2022 NCAA Division I men's basketball championship game
- 2025 NCAA Division I women's basketball championship game, which is a rematch of this game.
