= 2021–22 Georgetown Hoyas women's basketball team =

Intercollegiate basketball season

2021–22 Georgetown Hoyas women's basketball
- Conference: Big East
- Record: 10–19 (4–15 Big East)
- Head coach: James Howard (5th season)
- Assistant coaches: Niki Reid Geckeler; Andre Bolton; Erin Dickerson
- Home arena: McDonough Gymnasium

2021–22 Big East women's basketball standings
	Conf.				Overall
Team	W		L	PCT	W		L	PCT
No. 5 UConn †	16	–	1	.941	30	–	6	.833
Villanova	15	–	4	.789	24	–	9	.727
Creighton	15	–	5	.750	23	–	10	.697
DePaul	14	–	6	.700	22	–	11	.667
Marquette	13	–	7	.650	23	–	11	.676
Seton Hall	12	–	8	.600	24	–	13	.649
St. John's	7	–	12	.368	12	–	19	.387
Providence	6	–	14	.300	11	–	19	.367
Georgetown	4	–	15	.211	10	–	19	.345
Xavier	4	–	16	.200	9	–	21	.300
Butler	0	–	18	.000	1	–	27	.036
† 2022 Big East tournament winner Rankings from AP poll

The 2021–22 Georgetown Hoyas women's basketball team represented Georgetown University in the 2021–22 college basketball season. The Hoyas, led by fifth year head coach James Howard, were members of the Big East Conference. The Hoyas played their home games at the McDonough Gymnasium.

== Roster ==
2021–22 Georgetown Hoyas women's basketball team
Players
Coaches

Pos.	#	Name	Height	Year	Previous school	Hometown
G	0	Yasmin Ott	5 ft 7 in (1.7 m)	So	Little Rock Christian	Little Rock, AR
G	1	Kelsey Ransom	5 ft 10 in (1.78 m)	So	Bishop Ahr	South River, NJ
G	2	Teaghan Flaherty	5 ft 10 in (1.78 m)	So	Rye	Rye, NY
G	4	Natalie Jasper	5 ft 5 in (1.65 m)	Fr	Ellis	Pittsburgh, PA
G	10	Kaylin West	5 ft 7 in (1.7 m)	GS	Coastal Carolina	Bethlehem, PA
F	13	Anita Kalava	6 ft 3 in (1.91 m)	GS	Maine	Zagreb, Croatia
F	14	Jillian Archer	6 ft 2 in (1.88 m)	Sr	Southern California	Santa Monica, CA
F	15	Brianna Scott	6 ft 4 in (1.93 m)	Fr	South Lakes	Reston, VA
G	20	Jazmyn Harmon	5 ft 8 in (1.73 m)	So	Brentwood	Brentwood, TN
C	21	Ariel Jenkins	6 ft 3 in (1.91 m)	Fr	Stuart Country Day	Piscataway, NJ
F/C	22	Shanniah Wright	6 ft 1 in (1.85 m)	Sr	Poly Prep	Brooklyn, NY
G	23	Milan Bolden-Morris	5 ft 10 in (1.78 m)	GS	Boston College	Belle Glade, FL
F	24	Kaliyah Myricks	6 ft 2 in (1.88 m)	Fr	George School	Hammonton, NJ
F	33	Graceann Bennett	6 ft 3 in (1.91 m)	Fr	Lake George	Lake George, NY
G	44	Mary Clougherty	6 ft 0 in (1.83 m)	GS	Lehigh	Herndon, VA

Head coach

- James Howard (Greensboro)

Assistant coach(es)

- Niki Reid Geckeler (Georgetown)
- Andre Bolton (Christopher Newport)
- Erin Dickerson (Northwestern)

Legend

- (C) Team captain
- (S) Suspended
- (I) Ineligible
- (W) Walk-on
- Injured
- Current redshirt

Roster
Last update: February 14, 2022

== Schedule ==
Date time, TV	Rank^{#}	Opponent^{#}	Result	Record	Site (attendance) city, state
Regular season
November 9, 2021; 7:00 pm, ESPN+		at Navy	W 73–62	1–0	Alumni Hall (423); Annapolis, Maryland
November 12, 2021*; 7:00 pm, BEDN		Salem	W 86–48	2–0	McDonough Gymnasium (321); Washington, D.C.
November 17, 2021*; 7:00 pm, BEDN		Davidson	L 55–70	2–1	McDonough Gymnasium (361); Washington, D.C.
November 21, 2021*; 2:00 pm, BEDN		Columbia	L 56–66 ^{2OT}	2–2	McDonough Gymnasium (303); Washington, D.C.
November 24, 2021*; 2:00 pm, BEDN		Loyola (MD)	W 66–55	3–2	McDonough Gymnasium; Washington, D.C.
November 30, 2021*; 5:00 pm, BEDN		Temple	L 47–49	3–3	McDonough Gymnasium (221); Washington, D.C.
December 3, 2021; 1:00 pm, BEDN		at Creighton	L 38–64	3–4 (0–1)	D. J. Sokol Arena (416); Omaha, NE
December 5, 2021; 1:00 pm, BEDN		at Providence	W 55–47	4–4 (1–1)	Alumni Hall (262); Providence, RI
December 9, 2021*; 7:00 pm, BEDN		George Washington	W 68–63	5–4	McDonough Gymnasium; Washington, D.C.
December 13, 2021*; 7:00 pm, BEDN		Coppin State	W 59–53	6–4	McDonough Gymnasium (289); Washington, D.C.
December 31, 2021; 12:00 pm, BEDN		St. John's	Canceled due to the COVID-19 pandemic		McDonough Gymnasium; Washington, D.C.
January 2, 2022; 2:00 pm, BEDN		Seton Hall	Canceled due to the COVID-19 pandemic		McDonough Gymnasium; Washington, D.C.
January 5, 2022; 7:00 pm, SNY		UConn	Canceled due to the COVID-19 pandemic		McDonough Gymnasium; Washington, D.C.
January 9, 2022; 2:00 pm, BEDN		Villanova	Canceled due to the COVID-19 pandemic		McDonough Gymnasium; Washington, D.C.
January 14, 2022; 8:00 pm, BEDN		Marquette	L 32–68	6–5 (1–2)	Al McGuire Center (1,206); Milwaukee, WI
January 16, 2022; 3:00 pm, BEDN		DePaul	L 69–102	6–6 (1–3)	Wintrust Arena (973); Chicago, IL
January 21, 2022; 7:00 pm, BEDN		Creighton	L 70–80	6–7 (1–4)	McDonough Gymnasium; Washington, D.C.
January 23, 2022; 2:00 pm, BEDN		Providence	L 58–66 ^{OT}	6–8 (1–5)	McDonough Gymnasium; Washington, D.C.
January 25, 2022; 7:00 pm, BEDN		St. John's; Rescheduled from December 31	L 52–80	6–9 (1–6)	McDonough Gymnasium; Washington, D.C.
January 28, 2022; 7:00 pm, BEDN/FloSports		Xavier	L 67–70 ^{OT}	6–10 (1–7)	McDonough Gymnasium; Washington, D.C.
January 30, 2022; 2:00 pm, BEDN		Butler	W 78–62	7–10 (2–7)	McDonough Gymnasium; Washington, D.C.
February 2, 2022; 7:00 pm, BEDN		at Seton Hall	L 62–91	7–11 (2–8)	Walsh Gymnasium (694); South Orange, NJ
February 6, 2022; 2:00 pm, BEDN		at Villanova	L 57–76	7–12 (2–9)	Finneran Pavilion (1,009); Villanova, PA
February 9, 2022; 7:00 pm, BEDN		Seton Hall; Rescheduled from January 2	L 50–60	7–13 (2–10)	McDonough Gymnasium (945); Washington, D.C.
February 11, 2022; 7:00 pm, BEDN		at St. John's	L 45–79	7–14 (2–11)	Carnesecca Arena (362); Jamaica, NY
February 13, 2022; 2:00 pm, BEDN		DePaul	L 104–105 ^{2OT}	7–15 (2–12)	McDonough Gymnasium (203); Washington, D.C.
February 18, 2022; 7:00 pm, FS2		Marquette	L 57–64	7–16 (2–13)	McDonough Gymnasium (617); Washington, D.C.
February 20, 2022; 2:00 pm, CBSSN		at No. 10 UConn	L 49–90	7–17 (2–14)	XL Center (10,114); Hartford, CT
February 22, 2022; 7:00 pm, BEDN		Villanova; Rescheduled from January 9	L 61–73	7–18 (2–15)	McDonough Gymnasium (329); Washington, D.C.
February 25, 2022; 7:00 pm, BEDN/FloSports		at Xavier	W 54–40	8–18 (3–15)	Cintas Center (629); Cincinnati, OH
February 27, 2022; 2:00 pm, BEDN		at Butler	W 69–48	9–18 (4–15)	Hinkle Fieldhouse (847); Indianapolis, IN
Big East tournament
March 4, 2022; 11:00 am, BEDN/FloHoops	(9)	vs. (8) Providence; First Round	W 68–55	10–18	Mohegan Sun Arena; Uncasville, CT
March 5, 2022; 12:00 pm, FS1	(9)	vs. (1) No. 7 UConn; Quarterfinals	L 38–84	10–19	Mohegan Sun Arena; Uncasville, CT
*Non-conference game. ^{#}Rankings from AP Poll. (#) Tournament seedings in parentheses. All times are in EST.

== See also ==
- 2021–22 Georgetown Hoyas men's basketball team
