= 2021–22 Butler Bulldogs women's basketball team =

Intercollegiate basketball season

2021–22 Butler Bulldogs women's basketball
- Conference: Big East
- Record: 1–21 (0–13 Big East)
- Head coach: Kurt Godlevske (8th season)
- Assistant coaches: Brian Neal; Whitney Jennings; Gabby Johnson
- Home arena: Hinkle Fieldhouse

2021–22 Big East women's basketball standings
	Conf.				Overall
Team	W		L	PCT	W		L	PCT
No. 5 UConn †	16	–	1	.941	30	–	6	.833
Villanova	15	–	4	.789	24	–	9	.727
Creighton	15	–	5	.750	23	–	10	.697
DePaul	14	–	6	.700	22	–	11	.667
Marquette	13	–	7	.650	23	–	11	.676
Seton Hall	12	–	8	.600	24	–	13	.649
St. John's	7	–	12	.368	12	–	19	.387
Providence	6	–	14	.300	11	–	19	.367
Georgetown	4	–	15	.211	10	–	19	.345
Xavier	4	–	16	.200	9	–	21	.300
Butler	0	–	18	.000	1	–	27	.036
† 2022 Big East tournament winner Rankings from AP poll

The 2021–22 Butler Bulldogs women's basketball team represented Butler University in the 2021–22 NCAA Division I women's basketball season. The Bulldogs, led by eighth year head coach Kurt Godlevske, played their home games at Hinkle Fieldhouse and were members of the Big East Conference.

== Roster ==
2021–22 Butler Bulldogs women's basketball team
Players
Coaches

Pos.	#	Name	Height	Year	Previous school	Hometown
F	0	Celena Taborn	6 ft 3 in (1.91 m)	GS	Furman	Sidney, OH
G	1	Jamilyn Robinson	5 ft 10 in (1.78 m)	Sr	Ascension Christian	Gonzales, LA
G	2	Genesis Parker	5 ft 8 in (1.73 m)	GS	Cincinnati	Bristow, VA
G	3	Madison Royal-Davis	5 ft 11 in (1.8 m)	Fr	Toledo Christian	Toledo, OH
G	5	Emilia Sexton	5 ft 4 in (1.63 m)	Sr	Male	Louisville, KY
G	10	Trinity White	5 ft 9 in (1.75 m)	Fr	McKinney	McKinney, TX
G	11	Tenley Dowell	6 ft 0 in (1.83 m)	RS So	Morton	Morton, IL
G	13	Zoe Jackson	5 ft 7 in (1.7 m)	Fr	Allen	McKinney, TX
G	15	Oumou Toure	5 ft 11 in (1.8 m)	Jr	Kamiakin	Kennewick, WA
F	20	Alex Richard	6 ft 1 in (1.85 m)	Fr	Avon	Avon, IN
F	22	Rosemarie Dumont	6 ft 3 in (1.91 m)	So	Sainte-Foy	Québec
F	25	Ellen Ross	5 ft 11 in (1.8 m)	Sr	Bishop Dwenger	Fort Wayne, IN
G/F	30	Abby Stoddard	6 ft 1 in (1.85 m)	So	Crown Point	Crown Point, IN
F	32	Sydney James	6 ft 3 in (1.91 m)	Fr	Trinity Lutheran	Brownstown, IN
F	34	Kate Tanner	6 ft 2 in (1.88 m)	RS Fr	Kingswood	Melbourne, Australia
G	55	Kendall Wingler	5 ft 10 in (1.78 m)	RS Fr	Eastern Kentucky	Ekron, KY

Head coach

- Kurt Godlevske (Northern Michigan)

Assistant coach(es)

- Brian Neal (Northern Kentucky)
- Whitney Jennings (Butler)
- Gabby Johnson (Thomas More)

Legend

- (C) Team captain
- (S) Suspended
- (I) Ineligible
- (W) Walk-on
- Injured
- Current redshirt

Roster
Last update: February 14, 2022

== Schedule ==
Date time, TV	Rank^{#}	Opponent^{#}	Result	Record	Site (attendance) city, state
Exhibition
November 4, 2021*; 7:00 pm		Trine University; Exhibition game			Hinkle Fieldhouse; Indianapolis, IN
Regular season
November 10, 2021; 7:00 pm, BEDN		No. 8 Indiana	L 63–86	0–1	Hinkle Fieldhouse (2,360); Indianapolis, IN
November 13, 2021; 12:00 pm, BEDN		Western Illinois	L 46–73	0–2	Hinkle Fieldhouse (462); Indianapolis, IN
November 16, 2021; 7:00 pm, BEDN		Ball State	L 56–70	0–3	Hinkle Fieldhouse (634); Indianapolis, IN
November 20, 2021; 12:00 pm, BEDN		Austin Peay	L 65–68	0–4	Hinkle Fieldhouse (458); Indianapolis, IN
November 23, 2021; 12:00 pm, BEDN		SIU Edwardsville	L 74–87	0–5	Hinkle Fieldhouse (320); Indianapolis, IN
November 28, 2021; 3:00 pm		at IUPUI	L 47–80	0–6	Indiana Farmers Coliseum (441); Indianapolis, IN
December 3, 2021; 7:00 pm, BEDN		at DePaul	L 64–101	0–7 (0–1)	Wintrust Arena (1,036); Chicago, IL
December 5, 2021; 2:00 pm, BEDN		at Marquette	L 45–59	0–8 (0–2)	Al McGuire Center (1,015); Milwaukee, WI
December 10, 2021; 6:00 pm, BEDN		Denver	L 94–100 ^{4 OT}	0–9	Hinkle Fieldhouse (572); Indianapolis, IN
December 12, 2021; 2:00 pm		Illinois	L 66–78	0–10	State Farm Center (1,015); Champaign, IL
December 22, 2021; 1:00 pm, BEDN		Evansville	W 75–67	1–10	Hinkle Fieldhouse (698); Indianapolis, IN
December 29, 2021; 2:00 pm		at Xavier	L 55–77	1–11 (0–3)	Cintas Center (402); Cincinnati, OH
December 31, 2021; 2:00 pm, BEDN		Creighton; Covid issues within the Butler program. Rescheduled for Feb. 19			Hinkle Fieldhouse; Indianapolis, IN
January 2, 2022; 12:00 pm, FS1		Providence; Covid issues within the Providence program. Rescheduled for Feb. 16			Hinkle Fieldhouse; Indianapolis, IN
January 7, 2022; 11:00 am, BEDN		at Seton Hall; Covid issues within the Butler program. Rescheduled for Feb. 22			Walsh Gymnasium; South Orange, NJ
January 9, 2022; 1:00 pm, BEDN		at St. John's; Covid issues within the Butler program. Game canceled.			Carnesecca Arena; Queens, NY
January 12, 2022; 7:00 pm, SNY		No. 10 UConn	L 47–92	1–12 (0–4)	Hinkle Fieldhouse (2,772); Indianapolis, IN
January 19, 2022; 6:00 pm, BEDN		Creighton	L 44–95	1–13 (0–5)	Hinkle Fieldhouse (386); Indianapolis, IN
January 21, 2022; 7:00 pm, BEDN		DePaul	L 69–103	1–14 (0–6)	Hinkle Fieldhouse (607); Indianapolis, IN
January 23, 2022; 2:00 pm, BEDN		Marquette	L 48–78	1–15 (0–7)	Hinkle Fieldhouse (689); Indianapolis, IN
January 28, 2022; 12:00 pm, BEDN		at Villanova	L 44–59	1–16 (0–8)	Finneran Pavilion (519); Villanova, PA
January 30, 2022; 2:00 pm, BEDN		Georgetown	L 62–78	1–17 (0–9)	McDonough Gymnasium; Washington, D.C.
February 4, 2022; 7:00 pm, SNY		at No. 10 UConn; Winter weather–related travel issues. Game canceled.			Harry A. Gampel Pavilion; Storrs, CT
February 6, 2022; 2:00 pm, BEDN		Seton Hall	L 56–72	1–18 (0–10)	Hinkle Fieldhouse (689); Indianapolis, IN
February 9, 2022; 7:00 pm, BEDN		St. John's	L 61–73	1–19 (0–11)	Hinkle Fieldhouse (457); Indianapolis, IN
February 11, 2022; 7:00 pm, BEDN		at Providence	L 53–64	1–20 (0–12)	Alumni Hall (364); Providence, RI
February 13, 2022; 1:00 pm, BEDN		Creighton	L 49–96	1–21 (0–13)	D. J. Sokol Arena (1,184); Omaha, NE
February 7, 2021; 7:00 pm, BEDN		Providence	L 41–69	1–22 (0–14)	Hinkle Fieldhouse (518); Indianapolis, IN
February 16, 2022; 7:00 pm, BEDN		Xavier	L 54–73	1–23 (0–15)	Hinkle Fieldhouse (445); Indianapolis, IN
February 22, 2022; 11:00 am, BEDN		at Seton Hall	L 55–84	1–24 (0–16)	Walsh Gymnasium (426); South Orange, NJ
February 25, 2022; 7:00 pm, BEDN		Villanova	L 36–72	1–25 (0–17)	Hinkle Fieldhouse (422); Indianapolis, IN
February 27, 2022; 2:00 pm, BEDN		Georgetown	L 48–69	1–26 (0–18)	Hinke Fieldhouse (847); Indianapolis, IN
Big East Tournament
March 4, 2022; 4:00 pm, BEDN	(11)	vs. (6) Seton Hall; First Round	L 39–58	1–27	Mohegan Sun Arena; Uncasville, CT
*Non-conference game. ^{#}Rankings from AP Poll. (#) Tournament seedings in parentheses. All times are in EST.

== See also ==
- 2021–22 Butler Bulldogs men's basketball team
