= 2021–22 Marquette Golden Eagles women's basketball team =

Intercollegiate basketball season

2021–22 Marquette Golden Eagles women's basketball
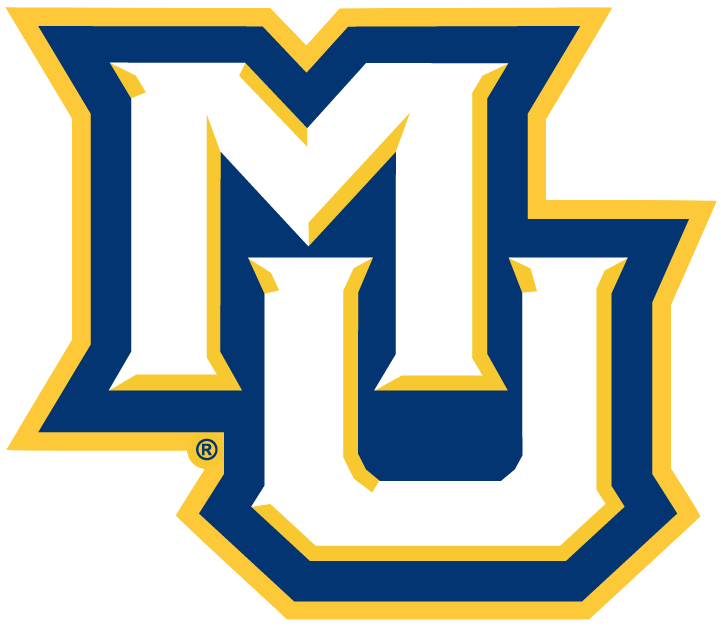

WNIT, Third Round
- Conference: Big East Conference
- Record: 23–11 (13–7 Big East)
- Head coach: Megan Duffy (3rd season)
- Assistant coaches: Kelly Komara; Justine Raterman; Tasha Taylor
- Home arena: Al McGuire Center

2021–22 Big East women's basketball standings
	Conf.				Overall
Team	W		L	PCT	W		L	PCT
No. 5 UConn †	16	–	1	.941	30	–	6	.833
Villanova	15	–	4	.789	24	–	9	.727
Creighton	15	–	5	.750	23	–	10	.697
DePaul	14	–	6	.700	22	–	11	.667
Marquette	13	–	7	.650	23	–	11	.676
Seton Hall	12	–	8	.600	24	–	13	.649
St. John's	7	–	12	.368	12	–	19	.387
Providence	6	–	14	.300	11	–	19	.367
Georgetown	4	–	15	.211	10	–	19	.345
Xavier	4	–	16	.200	9	–	21	.300
Butler	0	–	18	.000	1	–	27	.036
† 2022 Big East tournament winner Rankings from AP poll

The 2021–22 Marquette Golden Eagles women's basketball team represented Marquette University in the 2021–22 NCAA Division I women's basketball season. The Golden Eagles, led by third year head coach Megan Duffy, played their home games at the Al McGuire Center and were members of the Big East Conference.

== Roster ==
2021–22 Marquette Golden Eagles women's basketball team
Players
Coaches

Pos.	#	Name	Height	Year	Previous school	Hometown
F	0	Julianna Okosun	6 ft 4 in (1.93 m)	So	Falkonergarden and HF-Kursus	Copenhagen, Denmark
G	1	Nirel Lougbo	5 ft 10 in (1.78 m)	RS So	Tabor	North Andover, MA
G	3	Rose Nkumu	5 ft 7 in (1.7 m)	So	Iowa City	Iowa City, IA
G	4	Antwainette Walker	5 ft 11 in (1.8 m)	Jr	St. Francis; Arkansas-Little Rock	Lisle, IL
G	10	Claire Kaifes	5 ft 11 in (1.8 m)	Jr	Mill Valley	Shawnee, KS
G	12	Karissa McLaughlin	5 ft 7 in (1.7 m)	GS	Homestead	Fort Wayne, IN
G	23	Jordan King	5 ft 11 in (1.8 m)	Jr	Hononegah	Rockton, IL
F	24	Makiyah Williams	6 ft 0 in (1.83 m)	Fr	Trinity	Chicago, IL
G	25	Danyel Middleton	5 ft 10 in (1.78 m)	So	Bolingbrook	Chicago, IL
F	32	Liza Karlen	6 ft 2 in (1.88 m)	So	Stillwater Area	St. Paul, MN
F	42	Lauren Van Kleunen	6 ft 2 in (1.88 m)	GS	Mason	Mason, OH
F	44	Kennedi Myles	6 ft 2 in (1.88 m)	Jr	Walnut Hills	Cincinnati, OH
F	52	Chloe Marotta	6 ft 1 in (1.85 m)	Sr	Homestead	Mequon, WI

Head coach

- Megan Duffy (Notre Dame)

Assistant coach(es)

- Kelly Komara (Purdue)
- Justine Raterman (Dayton)
- Tasha Taylor (Clemson)

Legend

- (C) Team captain
- (S) Suspended
- (I) Ineligible
- (W) Walk-on
- Injured
- Current redshirt

Roster
Last update: February 21, 2022

== Schedule ==
Date time, TV	Rank^{#}	Opponent^{#}	Result	Record	Site (attendance) city, state
Regular season
Nov 9, 2021*; 6:00 pm		Alcorn State	W 96–35	1–0	Al McGuire Center (819); Milwaukee, WI
Nov 12, 2021*; 6:00 pm		NJIT	W 90–58	2–0	Al McGuire Center (849); Milwaukee, WI
Nov 15, 2021*; 12:00 pm		Southern	W 65–40	3–0	Al McGuire Center (785); Milwaukee, WI
Nov 19, 2021*; 8:00 pm, Live Stream		at Colorado	L 53–69	3–1	CU Events Center (1,227); Boulder, CO
Nov 26, 2021*; 11:00 am		vs. Middle Tennessee; Daytona Beach Invitational	W 59–55 ^{OT}	4–1	Ocean Center; Daytona Beach, FL
Nov 27, 2021*; 1:15 pm		vs. Georgia; Daytona Beach Invitational	L 45–70	4–2	Ocean Center; Daytona Beach, FL
Dec 3, 2021; 7:00 pm, BEDN/FloSports		Xavier	W 76–48	5–2 (1–0)	Al McGuire Center (850); Milwaukee, WI
Dec 5, 2021; 2:00 pm, BEDN		Butler	W 59–45	6–2 (2–0)	Al McGuire Center (1,015); Milwaukee, WI
Dec 8, 2021*; 7:00 pm		at Milwaukee	W 59–51	7–2	J. Martin Klotsche Center (970); Milwaukee, WI
Dec 11, 2021*; 4:00 pm		North Dakota	W 89–65	8–2	Al McGuire Center (1,011); Milwaukee, WI
Dec 19, 2021; 11:00 am, FS1		at Seton Hall	L 57–69	8–3 (2–1)	Walsh Gymnasium (608); South Orange, NJ
Dec 22, 2021*; 1:00 pm		Cincinnati	W 60–49	9–3	Al McGuire Center (853); Milwaukee, WI
Dec 29, 2021; SNY		at No. 11 UConn	Postponed to February 23, 2022		XL Center; Hartford, CT
Jan 7, 2022; 6:30 pm, BEDN		at Creighton	L 45–62	9–4 (2–2)	D. J. Sokol Arena (986); Omaha, NE
Jan 12, 2022; 7:00 pm		DePaul	W 88–85 ^{OT}	10–4 (3–2)	Al McGuire Center (1,227); Milwaukee, WI
Jan 14, 2022; 7:00 pm, BEDN		Georgetown	W 68–32	11–4 (4–2)	Al McGuire Center (1,206); Milwaukee, WI
Jan 16, 2022; 1:00 pm, CBSSN		Villanova	L 55–58	11–5 (4–3)	Al McGuire Center (1,276); Milwaukee, WI
Jan 21, 2022; 6:00 pm, BEDN/FloSports		at Xavier	W 65–46	12–5 (5–3)	Cintas Center (571); Cincinnati, OH
Jan 23, 2022; 1:00 pm, BEDN		at Butler	W 78–48	13–5 (6–3)	Hinkle Fieldhouse (689); Indianapolis, IN
Jan 26, 2022; 7:00 pm		Seton Hall	W 62–43	14–5 (7–3)	Al McGuire Center (1,064); Milwaukee, WI
Jan 30, 2022; 2:00 pm		at St. John's	W 70–65	15–5 (8–3)	Carnesecca Arena (263); Queens, NY
Feb 4, 2022; 7:00 pm		Providence	W 61–59	16–5 (9–3)	Al McGuire Center (1,344); Milwaukee, WI
Feb 6, 2022; 1:00 pm, BEDN/FS1		Creighton	W 50–47	17–5 (10–3)	Al McGuire Center (1,719); Milwaukee, WI
Feb 11, 2022; 6:00 pm, BEDN		Villanova	L 63–74 ^{OT}	17–6 (10–4)	Finneran Pavilion (1,405); Villanova, PA
Feb 13, 2022; 1:30 pm, FOX		No. 8 UConn	L 58–72	17–7 (10–5)	Al McGuire Center (3,008); Milwaukee, WI
Feb 16, 2022; 7:00 pm		at DePaul	L 66–77	17–8 (10–6)	Wintrust Arena (1,038); Chicago, IL
Feb 18, 2022; 6:00 pm, FS2		at Georgetown	W 64–57	18–8 (11–6)	McDonough Gymnasium (617); Washington, D.C.
Feb 23, 2022; 6:00 pm, SNY		at No. 7 UConn; Rescheduled from December 29	L 38–69	18–9 (11–7)	XL Center (9,197); Hartford, CT
Feb 25, 2022; 6:00 pm		at Providence	W 57–51	19–9 (12–7)	Alumni Hall (451); Providence, RI
Feb 27, 2022; 2:00 pm		St. John's	W 79–75	20–9 (13–7)	Al McGuire Center (1,824); Milwaukee, WI
Big East Tournament
Mar 5, 2022; 1:30 pm, FS2	(5)	vs. (4) DePaul; Quarterfinals	W 105–85	21–9	Mohegan Sun Arena; Uncasville, CT
Mar 6, 2022; 2:00 pm, FS1	(5)	vs. (1) No. 7 UConn; Semifinals	L 51–71	21–10	Mohegan Sun Arena; Uncasville, CT
WNIT
Mar 16, 2022*; 7:00 pm		Ball State; First Round	W 93–70	22–10	Al McGuire Center (880); Milwaukee, WI
Mar 21, 2022*; 7:00 pm, FloHoops		Purdue; Second Round	W 77–62	23–10	Al McGuire Center (1,311); Milwaukee, WI
Mar 24, 2022*; 7:00 pm		Toledo; Third Round	L 82–92	23–11	Al McGuire Center (1,552); Milwaukee, WI
*Non-conference game. ^{#}Rankings from AP Poll. (#) Tournament seedings in parentheses. All times are in Central.

== See also ==
- 2021–22 Marquette Golden Eagles men's basketball team
