= 2021–22 St. John's Red Storm women's basketball team =

Intercollegiate basketball season

2021–22 St. John's Red Storm women's basketball
- Conference: Big East Conference
- Record: 12–19 (7–12 Big East)
- Head coach: Joe Tartamella (10th season)
- Assistant coaches: Bill Ferrara; Shenneika Smith; Candice Walker
- Home arena: Carnesecca Arena

2021–22 Big East women's basketball standings
	Conf.				Overall
Team	W		L	PCT	W		L	PCT
No. 5 UConn †	16	–	1	.941	30	–	6	.833
Villanova	15	–	4	.789	24	–	9	.727
Creighton	15	–	5	.750	23	–	10	.697
DePaul	14	–	6	.700	22	–	11	.667
Marquette	13	–	7	.650	23	–	11	.676
Seton Hall	12	–	8	.600	24	–	13	.649
St. John's	7	–	12	.368	12	–	19	.387
Providence	6	–	14	.300	11	–	19	.367
Georgetown	4	–	15	.211	10	–	19	.345
Xavier	4	–	16	.200	9	–	21	.300
Butler	0	–	18	.000	1	–	27	.036
† 2022 Big East tournament winner Rankings from AP poll

The 2021–22 St. John's Red Storm women's basketball team represent St. John's University during the 2021–22 NCAA Division I women's basketball season. The Red Storm, led by tenth-year head coach Joe Tartamella, play their games at Carnesecca Arena and are members of the Big East Conference.

== Roster ==
2021–22 St. John's Red Storm women's basketball team
Players
Coaches

Pos.	#	Name	Height	Year	Previous school	Hometown
G	1	Unique Drake	5 ft 7 in (1.7 m)	Jr	Westwood	Columbia, SC
G	2	Leilani Correa	6 ft 0 in (1.83 m)	Jr	Manchester Township	Manchester, NJ
F	3	Danielle Patterson	6 ft 2 in (1.88 m)	GS	Mary Louis	Brooklyn, NY
G	5	Sara Zabrecky	5 ft 9 in (1.75 m)	So	Munster	Munster, IN
G	11	Sitota Gines	5 ft 10 in (1.78 m)	Fr		Zagagoza, Spain
F	13	Danielle Cosgrove	6 ft 4 in (1.93 m)	Sr	Sachem East	Holbrook, NY
F	14	Sophia Nolan	6 ft 1 in (1.85 m)	Jr	Marquette Catholic	Valparaiso, IN
F	20	Rayven Peoples	6 ft 3 in (1.91 m)	Sr	John Hardin	Detroit, MI
G	22	Camree Gregg	5 ft 5 in (1.65 m)	GS	Wayne Memorial	Westland, MI
G	30	Kadaja Bailey	6 ft 0 in (1.83 m)	Sr	St. Mary's	Long Beach, NY
G	33	Katie Burton	5 ft 9 in (1.75 m)	Fr	Fisher	Fishers, IN
F	41	Emma Nolan	6 ft 1 in (1.85 m)	Jr	Marquette Catholic	Valparaiso, IN
G	45	Idan Shlush	5 ft 7 in (1.7 m)	Fr	Wingate	Gedera, Israel

Head coach

- Joe Tartamella (James Madison)

Assistant coach(es)

- Bill Ferrara (Florida)
- Shenneika Smith (St. John's)
- Candice Walker (Loyola (MD))

Legend

- (C) Team captain
- (S) Suspended
- (I) Ineligible
- (W) Walk-on
- Injured
- Current redshirt

Roster
Last update: February 21, 2022
