= 2021–22 Xavier Musketeers women's basketball team =

Intercollegiate basketball season

2021–22 Xavier Musketeers women's basketball
- Conference: Big East Conference
- Record: 9–21 (4–16 Big East)
- Head coach: Melanie Moore (3rd season)
- Assistant coaches: Candice Finley; Molly Bateman; Jovahn Masters
- Home arena: Cintas Center

2021–22 Big East women's basketball standings
	Conf.				Overall
Team	W		L	PCT	W		L	PCT
No. 5 UConn †	16	–	1	.941	30	–	6	.833
Villanova	15	–	4	.789	24	–	9	.727
Creighton	15	–	5	.750	23	–	10	.697
DePaul	14	–	6	.700	22	–	11	.667
Marquette	13	–	7	.650	23	–	11	.676
Seton Hall	12	–	8	.600	24	–	13	.649
St. John's	7	–	12	.368	12	–	19	.387
Providence	6	–	14	.300	11	–	19	.367
Georgetown	4	–	15	.211	10	–	19	.345
Xavier	4	–	16	.200	9	–	21	.300
Butler	0	–	18	.000	1	–	27	.036
† 2022 Big East tournament winner Rankings from AP poll

The 2021–22 Xavier Musketeers women's basketball team represented Xavier University during the 2021–22 NCAA Division I women's basketball season. The Musketeers, led by third-year head coach Melanie Moore, played their games at the Cintas Center and were members of the Big East Conference.

== Roster ==
2021–22 Xavier Musketeers women's basketball team
Players
Coaches

Pos.	#	Name	Height	Year	Previous school	Hometown
G	0	Shelby Calhoun	5 ft 11 in (1.8 m)	So	Virginia Tech	Louisville, KY
G	1	Nia Clark	5 ft 9 in (1.75 m)	RS So	Miami (Ohio)	Indianapolis, IN
C	2	Mikayla Hayes	6 ft 3 in (1.91 m)	GS	Clemson	Minneapolis, MN
G	3	Taylor Smith	5 ft 8 in (1.73 m)	Sr	Ole Miss	Marietta, GA
G	10	Shaila Beeler	5 ft 7 in (1.7 m)	Jr	Vincennes	Indianapolis, IN
G	11	Kae Satterfield	6 ft 0 in (1.83 m)	Jr	Ohio State	New York, NY
G	12	Kaysia Woods	6 ft 0 in (1.83 m)	Fr	Lincoln	Lincoln, NE
G	15	Mackayla Scarlett	5 ft 10 in (1.78 m)	So	St. Francis Prep	Bronx, NY
F	22	Kaybrianna Hallman	6 ft 2 in (1.88 m)	Fr	East Kentwood	Grand Rapids, MI
G/F	23	Aanaya Harris	5 ft 11 in (1.8 m)	Fr	Burke	Omaha, NE
F	30	Courtney Prenger	6 ft 1 in (1.85 m)	Jr	Minster High School	Minster, OH
F/C	31	Megan Harkey	6 ft 6 in (1.98 m)	So	Northwest Guilford	Summerfield, NC
F	44	Ayanna Townsend	6 ft 2 in (1.88 m)	RS Jr	Winchester Thurston	Pittsburgh, PA

Head coach

- Melanie Moore (Siena)

Assistant coach(es)

- Candice Finley (Eastern Kentucky)
- Molly Bateman (Defiance)
- Jovahn Masters (UW–La Crosse)

Legend

- (C) Team captain
- (S) Suspended
- (I) Ineligible
- (W) Walk-on
- Injured
- Current redshirt

Roster
Last update: February 15, 2022

== Schedule ==
Date time, TV	Rank^{#}	Opponent^{#}	Result	Record	Site (attendance) city, state
Regular season
Nov 9, 2021*; 7:00 pm, ESPN+		at Memphis	L 64–84	0–1	Larry O. Finch Center (521); Memphis, TN
Nov 13, 2021*; 2:00 pm		at Utah	L 71–106	0–2	Jon M. Huntsman Center (1,631); Salt Lake City, UT
Nov 17, 2021*; 7:00 pm, FloSports		Miami (OH)	L 73–77	0–3	Cintas Center (1,097); Cincinnati, OH
Nov 21, 2021*; 4:00 pm, FloSports		Valparaiso	W 70–49	1–3	Cintas Center (424); Cincinnati, OH
Nov 24, 2021*; 2:00 pm, ESPN+		at Wright State	W 62–47	2–3	Nutter Center (623); Dayton, OH
Nov 27, 2021*; 2:00 pm, ESPN+		at Eastern Kentucky	W 73–60	3–3	McBrayer Arena (525); Richmond, KY
Dec 3, 2021; 8:00 pm, BEDN/FloSports		at Marquette	L 48–76	3–4 (0–1)	Al McGuire Center (850); Milwaukee, WI
Dec 5, 2021; 6:00 pm, BEDN/FloSports		at DePaul	L 85–103	3–5 (0–2)	Wintrust Arena (868); Chicago, IL
Dec 8, 2021*; 12:00 pm, FloSports		Niagara	W 82–78	4–5	Cintas Center (2,268); Cincinnati, OH
Dec 12, 2021*; 2:00 pm, ESPN+		at Cincinnati; Skyline Chili Crosstown Shootout	L 73–82	4–6	Fifth Third Arena (4,514); Cincinnati, OH
Dec 19, 2021*; 2:00 pm, FloSports		Southeast Missouri State	W 65–58	5–6	Cintas Center (455); Cincinnati, OH
Dec 29, 2021; 2:00 pm, BEDN/FloSports		Butler	W 77–55	6–6 (1–2)	Cintas Center (402); Cincinnati, OH
Jan 2, 2022; 2:00 pm, BEDN/FloSports		Creighton	L 51–67	6–7 (1–3)	Cintas Center (349); Cincinnati, OH
Jan 11, 2022; 7:00 pm, BEDN/FloSports		Providence; Rescheduled from December 31	L 49–54	6–8 (1–4)	Cintas Center (429); Cincinnati, OH
Jan 15, 2022; 12:00 pm, SNY		at No. 10 UConn	L 41–78	6–9 (1–5)	XL Center (7,827); Hartford, CT
Jan 21, 2022; 7:00 pm, BEDN/FloSports		Marquette	L 46–65	6–10 (1–6)	Cintas Center (571); Cincinnati, OH
Jan 23, 2022; 2:00 pm, CBSSN		DePaul	L 74–94	6–11 (1–7)	Cintas Center (647); Cincinnati, OH
Jan 28, 2022; 7:00 pm, BEDN/FloSports		at Georgetown	W 70–67 ^{OT}	7–11 (2–7)	McDonough Gymnasium; Washington, D.C.
Jan 30, 2022; 2:00 pm, BEDN/FloSports		at Villanova	L 57–82	7–12 (2–8)	Finneran Pavilion (1,209); Villanova, PA
Feb 2, 2022; 6:00 pm, BEDN/FloSports		at St. John's; Rescheduled from January 7	L 63–83	7–13 (2–8)	Carnesecca Arena (221); Jamaica, NY
Feb 4, 2022; 1:00 pm, BEDN/FloSports		at Seton Hall	L 86–91	7–14 (2–9)	Walsh Gymnasium (479); South Orange, NJ
Feb 6, 2022; 2:00 pm, BEDN/FloSports		St. John's	L 62–96	7–15 (2–10)	Cintas Center (519); Cincinnati, OH
Feb 11, 2022; 7:30 pm, BEDN/FloSports		at Creighton	L 47–68	7–16 (2–11)	D. J. Sokol Arena (1,249); Omaha, NE
Feb 13, 2022; 12:00 pm, FS1		at Providence	W 62–60	8–16 (3–11)	Alumni Hall (312); Providence, RI
Feb 18, 2022; 7:00 pm, SNY		No. 10 UConn	L 35–89	8–17 (3–12)	Cintas Center (5,087); Cincinnati, OH
Feb 20, 2022; 7:00 pm, BEDN/FloSports		at Butler	W 73–54	9–17 (4–12)	Hinkle Fieldhouse (445); Indianapolis, IN
Feb 25, 2022; 7:00 pm, BEDN/FloSports		Georgetown	L 40–54	9–18 (4–13)	Cintas Center (629); Cincinnati, OH
Feb 27, 2022; 2:00 pm, BEDN/FloSports		Villanova	L 49–58	9–19 (4–14)	Cintas Center (435); Cincinnati, OH
Mar 1, 2022; 1:00 pm, BEDN/FloHoops		Seton Hall; Rescheduled from February 16	L 53–74	9–20 (4–15)	Cintas Center (156); Cincinnati, OH
Big East tournament
Mar 4, 2022; 1:30 pm, FloHoops	(10)	vs. (7) St. John's; First Round	L 69–76	9–21 (4–16)	Mohegan Sun Arena; Uncasville, CT
*Non-conference game. ^{#}Rankings from AP Poll. (#) Tournament seedings in parentheses. All times are in Eastern Time.

== See also ==
2021–22 Xavier Musketeers men's basketball team
