= Emma Ronsiek =

American basketball player

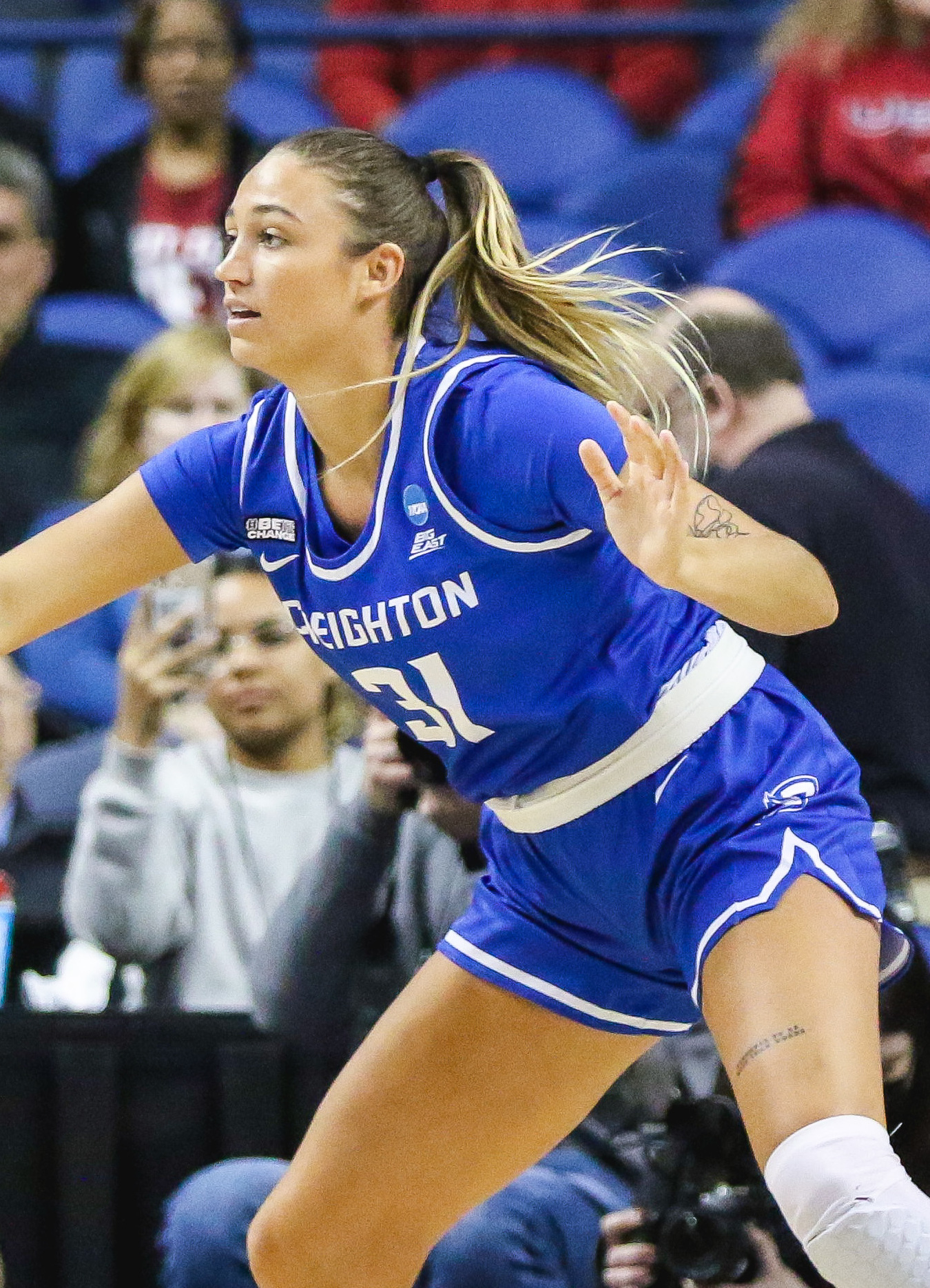
- Ronsiek with Creighton in 2022

Personal information
- Listed height: 6 ft 1 in (1.85 m)

Career information
- High school: O'Gorman (Sioux Falls, South Dakota)
- College: Creighton (2020–2024); Colorado State (2024–2025)
- Position: Forward
- Number: 31

Career highlights
- First-team All-MWC (2025); 2× First-team All-Big East (2022, 2024); Big East All-Freshman Team (2021); South Dakota Miss Basketball (2020)

Emma Ronsiek is an American college basketball player for the Creighton Bluejays of the Big East Conference.

== High school career ==
Ronsiek played basketball for O'Gorman Catholic High School in Sioux Falls, South Dakota. As a freshman, she helped her team win the Class AA state tournament, its first state title since 1995. In her senior season, Ronsiek led O'Gorman to a 21–0 record before the state tournament was canceled amid the COVID-19 pandemic. She was named Miss Basketball and Gatorade Player of the Year in South Dakota, and earned Argus Leader Basketball Player and Athlete of the Year honors. Ronsiek left as the program's all-time leading scorer. She committed to playing college basketball for Creighton over offers from Colorado State, Green Bay and South Dakota. In addition to basketball, Ronsiek was an all-state volleyball player in high school, leading the team to the Class AA state title game as a senior and breaking the program record for kills.

== College career ==
As a freshman at Creighton, Ronsiek averaged 11.6 points and 5.1 rebounds per game, earning Big East All-Freshman honors. On January 16, 2022, she scored a career-high 30 points in an 86–60 win over St. John's. Ronsiek helped 10th-seeded Creighton reach its first Elite Eight at the 2022 NCAA tournament. She averaged 13.9 points and five rebounds per game as a sophomore and was a first-team All-Big East selection. In her junior season, Ronsiek averaged 13.2 points, 5.3 rebounds and three assists per game, earning All-Big East honorable mention.

== Career statistics ==
Legend
GP	Games played	GS	Games started	MPG	Minutes per game	RPG	Rebounds per game
APG	Assists per game	SPG	Steals per game	BPG	Blocks per game	PPG	Points per game
TO	Turnovers per game	FG%	Field-goal percentage	3P%	3-point field-goal percentage	FT%	Free-throw percentage
**Bold**	Career best	°	League leader

=== College ===
Year	Team	GP	GS	MPG	FG%	3P%	FT%	RPG	APG	SPG	BPG	TO	PPG
2020–21	Creighton	20	14	27.8	47.0	36.3	80.0	5.1	1.2	0.3	0.7	**1.3**	11.6
2021–22	Creighton	**32**	**32**	28.3	**48.3**	33.9	69.6	5.0	2.5	0.8	0.9	1.5	13.9
2022–23	Creighton	31	31	29.7	45.7	**38.4**	80.0	5.3	**3.0**	**1.0**	0.4	2.4	13.2
2023–24	Creighton	**32**	**32**	33.9	47.2	33.1	**89.1**	5.3	2.7	**1.0**	**1.2**	2.1	16.8
2024–25	Colorado State	32	**32**	**37.1**	41.8	35.5	81.4	**6.0**	2.6	0.8	0.3	1.4	**17.7**
**Career**		147	141	31.7	45.7	35.4	81.3	5.4	2.5	0.8	0.7	1.7	14.9
Statistics retrieved from Sports-Reference.

== Personal life ==
Ronsiek's parents both played college basketball: her mother, Mary Beth, at Dakota Wesleyan and her father, Randy, at Westmar. Her younger sister, Hannah, plays basketball for Colorado State and was her teammate in high school. Ronsiek's older brother, Luke, played college basketball for Mount Marty.
