= 2022 Big East women's basketball tournament =

- Classification: Division I
- Season: 2021–22
- Teams: 11
- Site: Mohegan Sun Arena; Uncasville, Connecticut
- Champions: UConn (20th title)
- Winning coach: Geno Auriemma (20th title)
- MVP: Christyn Williams (UConn)
- Attendance: 28,094
- Television: FS1, FS2, FloHoops

The 2022 Big East women's basketball tournament was the postseason women’s basketball tournament for the Big East Conference and took place from March 4–7, 2022, at Mohegan Sun Arena in Uncasville, Connecticut. UConn won their 20th title, receiving the conference's automatic bid to the 2022 NCAA tournament.

2021–22 Big East women's basketball standings
	Conf.				Overall
Team	W		L	PCT	W		L	PCT
No. 5 UConn †	16	–	1	.941	30	–	6	.833
Villanova	15	–	4	.789	24	–	9	.727
Creighton	15	–	5	.750	23	–	10	.697
DePaul	14	–	6	.700	22	–	11	.667
Marquette	13	–	7	.650	23	–	11	.676
Seton Hall	12	–	8	.600	24	–	13	.649
St. John's	7	–	12	.368	12	–	19	.387
Providence	6	–	14	.300	11	–	19	.367
Georgetown	4	–	15	.211	10	–	19	.345
Xavier	4	–	16	.200	9	–	21	.300
Butler	0	–	18	.000	1	–	27	.036
† 2022 Big East tournament winner Rankings from AP poll

== Seeds ==
All 11 Big East schools are scheduled to participate in the tournament. Teams will be seeded by the conference record with tie-breaking procedures to determine the seeds for teams with identical conference records. The top five teams will receive first-round byes. Seeding for the tournament will be determined at the close of the regular conference season.

Seed	School	Conference Record	Tiebreaker
1	UConn	16–1	
2	Villanova	15–4	
3	Creighton	15–5	
4	DePaul	14–6	
5	Marquette	13–7	
6	Seton Hall	12–8	
7	St. John's	7–12	
8	Providence	6–14	
9	Georgetown	4–15	
10	Xavier	4–16	
11	Butler	0–18	

== Schedule ==
Game	Time	Matchup	Score	Television	Attendance
First round – Friday, March 4
1	11:00 am	No. 8 Providence vs. No. 9 Georgetown	55–68	FloHoops	4,347
2	1:30 pm	No. 7 St. John's vs. No. 10 Xavier	76–69	FloHoops	4,347
3	4:00 pm	No. 6 Seton Hall vs. No. 11 Butler	58–39	FloHoops	4,347
Quarterfinals – Saturday, March 5
4	12:00 pm	No. 1 UConn vs. No. 9 Georgetown	84–38	FS1	6,376
5	2:30 pm	No. 4 DePaul vs. No. 5 Marquette	85–105	FS2	6,376
6	7:00 pm	No. 2 Villanova vs. No. 7 St. John's	76–52	FS2	4,478
7	9:30 pm	No. 3 Creighton vs. No. 6 Seton Hall	65–66	FS2	4,478
Semifinals – Sunday, March 6
8	3:00pm	No. 1 UConn vs. No. 5 Marquette	71–51	FS1	6,434
9	5:30pm	No. 2 Villanova vs. No. 6 Seton Hall	64–55	FS1	6,434
Championship – Monday, March 7
10	8:00pm	No. 1 UConn vs. No. 2 Villanova	70–40	FS1	6,459
Game times in Eastern Time. Rankings denote tournament seed.

== Bracket ==
First round Friday, March 4 FloHoops
8	Providence	55
9	Georgetown	68
7	St. John's	76
10	Xavier	69
6	Seton Hall	58
11	Butler	39

Quarterfinals; Saturday, March 5 FS2, FS1
1	UConn	84
9	Georgetown	38
4	DePaul	85
5	Marquette	105
2	Villanova	76
7	St. John's	52
3	Creighton	65
6	Seton Hall	66

Semifinals; Sunday, March 6 FS1
1	UConn	71
5	Marquette	51
2	Villanova	64
6	Seton Hall	55

Championship; Monday, March 7 FS1
1	UConn	70
2	Villanova	40
