= 2021–22 UConn Huskies women's basketball team =

Intercollegiate basketball season

2021–22 UConn Huskies women's basketball

Big East tournament champions; Big East regular season champions

NCAA tournament, runner-up
- Conference: Big East Conference

Ranking
- Coaches: No. 2
- AP: No. 5
- Record: 30–6 (16–1 Big East)
- Head coach: Geno Auriemma (37th season)
- Associate head coach: Chris Dailey (37th season)
- Assistant coaches: Jamelle Elliott (2nd season); Morgan Valley (1st season)
- Home arena: Harry A. Gampel Pavilion; XL Center

2021–22 Big East women's basketball standings
	Conf.				Overall
Team	W		L	PCT	W		L	PCT
No. 5 UConn †	16	–	1	.941	30	–	6	.833
Villanova	15	–	4	.789	24	–	9	.727
Creighton	15	–	5	.750	23	–	10	.697
DePaul	14	–	6	.700	22	–	11	.667
Marquette	13	–	7	.650	23	–	11	.676
Seton Hall	12	–	8	.600	24	–	13	.649
St. John's	7	–	12	.368	12	–	19	.387
Providence	6	–	14	.300	11	–	19	.367
Georgetown	4	–	15	.211	10	–	19	.345
Xavier	4	–	16	.200	9	–	21	.300
Butler	0	–	18	.000	1	–	27	.036
† 2022 Big East tournament winner Rankings from AP poll

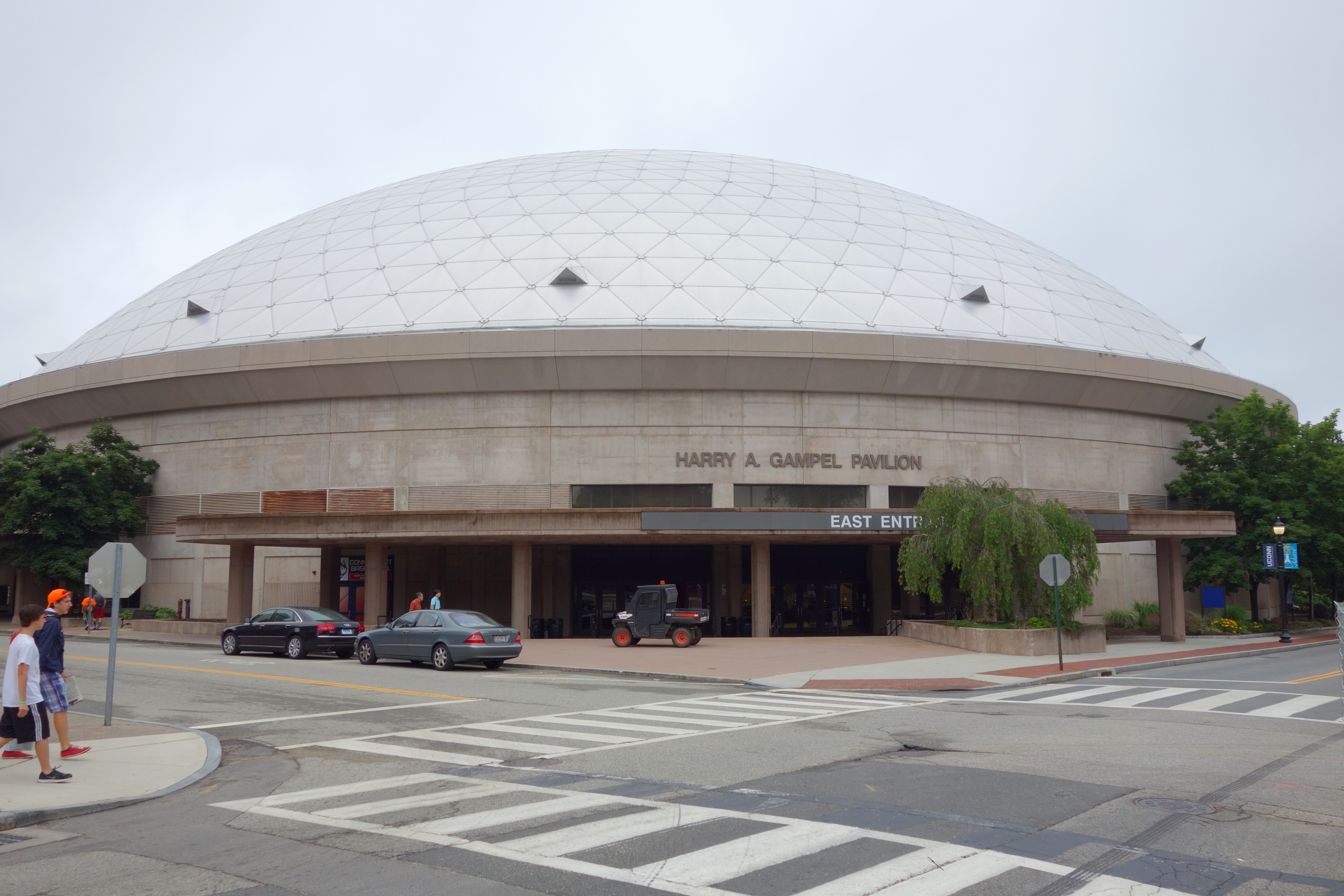
Harry A. Gampel Pavilion, where the Huskies played home games

The 2021–22 UConn Huskies women's basketball team represented the University of Connecticut (UConn) during the 2021–22 NCAA Division I women's basketball season. The Huskies, led by Hall of Fame head coach Geno Auriemma in his 37th season at UConn, split their home games between Harry A. Gampel Pavilion and the XL Center and were members of the Big East Conference, which they joined for women's basketball the previous season. UConn was a member of the original Big East Conference from 1979 through 2013, and one of the original women's basketball teams in that conference in 1982.

Returning from a 28–2 season with no graduations, the team went into the season highly regarded, starting the season ranked 2nd in the AP poll. The Huskies returned three seniors and sophomore consensus 2020–21 NCAA player of the year Paige Bueckers, while adding a 2nd ranked recruiting class. Several athletes transferred during the offseason and early season, leaving the team with 12 players. The no. 2 Huskies lost a November game against no. 1 South Carolina. Effects of the COVID-19 pandemic caused game postponements and cancellations. Injuries plagued the team; only two athletes played every game. In December, Bueckers suffered a knee fracture which kept her sidelined until late in the season.

With Bueckers out, UConn's offense struggled against several teams, with losses against unranked Georgia Tech and no. 6 Louisville before semester break, no. 9 Oregon in January, and unranked Big East Conference opponent Villanova in February. Coach Auriemma had the team focus on defense, keeping the Huskies in games when their offense was struggling. Nine different players started, and Auriemma tried eleven different starting lineups during the season. By the time Bueckers returned to the lineup for limited minutes, the Huskies were dominating without her. After winning the Big East regular season championship, the team won the 2022 Big East tournament and accepted an automatic bid to the 2022 NCAA Division I tournament.

As a number 2 seed in the NCAA tournament, UConn defeated 15th seed Mercer, 7th seed Central Florida, 3rd seed Indiana, and 1st seed North Carolina State to win their region and advance to their 14th consecutive Final Four. The Huskies then beat defending national champion Stanford before losing to South Carolina in the championship game. UConn finished the season with a record of 30–6.

== Previous season ==
UConn was ranked no. 3 in both the 2020 AP and Coaches pre-season polls. During the regular season, they had a record of 21–1, including 18–0 in the Big East to win the conference regular season championship. In February 2021, they defeated no. 1 ranked South Carolina; it was UConn freshman Paige Bueckers' third straight 30-point game. UConn won the Big East tournament, winning all three of their games by over 30 points. They were ranked no. 1 in both polls at that time. As a no. 1 seed in the NCAA tournament, they won their region with a victory over no. 5 ranked Baylor in the Elite Eight. UConn then lost to Arizona in the Final Four and finished their campaign with a record of 28–2. Bueckers, the team's leading scorer, won several awards at the end of the season, including the Naismith College Player of the Year.

== Offseason ==
=== Departures ===
The Huskies lost guards Autumn Chassion and Anna Makurat after the end of the previous season but graduated no seniors. Chassion, who had earned a place on the squad as a walk-on and played in eight games, chose to transfer to Louisiana State University at Eunice after the end of her freshman year. Makurat, who had played in 48 games in her two seasons, ended her time at UConn having averaged 6.5 points, 3.7 rebounds, and 3.0 assists per game and after entering the NCAA transfer portal, chose instead to return to her native Poland and play professional basketball with AZS AJP Gorzów Wielkopolski of the Basket Liga Kobiet. After the Huskies' first game, freshman Saylor Poffenbarger chose to transfer and then committed to play for Arkansas in late November. On December 13, sophomore forward Mir McLean announced she would be leaving the team at the end of the fall term and later transferred to Virginia.

Name	Number	Pos.	Height	Year	Hometown	Reason for departure
Autumn Chassion	2	G	5'8"	Sophomore	Lafayette, LA	Transferred to LSU Eunice
Saylor Poffenbarger	4	G	6'2"	Freshman	Middletown, MD	Transferred to Arkansas
Mir McLean	11	F	5'11"	Sophomore	Baltimore, MD	Transferred to Virginia
Anna Makurat	24	F	6'2"	Junior	Sierakowice, Poland	Signed with Basket Liga Kobiet

=== Incoming transfers ===
External video
- UCONN Women's Basketball Virtual Tour

The Huskies added forward Dorka Juhász, a graduate student transfer from Ohio State. Juhász was twice selected to the All-Big Ten team and averaged 14 points and 11 rebounds per game as a junior. Juhász had two years of eligibility remaining.

Name	Number	Pos.	Height	Year	Hometown	Previous school
Dorka Juhász	14	F	6'4"	Senior	Pécs, Hungary	Ohio State

=== Recruiting ===
The Huskies had one of the best recruiting classes in the nation. They again signed the top-ranked high school player in Azzi Fudd and added rangy guard Caroline Ducharme and 6-foot-5 forward Amari DeBerry. Saylor Poffenbarger started school during the 2021 spring semester and joined the team in January, but she decided to transfer to Arkansas in November 2021.

College recruiting
Name	Hometown	School	Height	Weight	Commit date
Azzi Fudd; G	Arlington, VA	St. John's College High School	5 ft 11 in (1.80 m)	N/A	
Azzi Fudd; G	Recruit ratings: ESPN: (98)				
Caroline Ducharme; G	Milton, MA	Noble & Greenough School	6 ft 1 in (1.85 m)	N/A	
Caroline Ducharme; G	Recruit ratings: ESPN: (98)				
Amari DeBerry; F	Williamsburg, NY	Williamsville South High School	6 ft 5 in (1.96 m)	N/A	
Amari DeBerry; F	Recruit ratings: ESPN: (96)				
Saylor Poffenbarger; G	Middletown, MD	Middletown High School	6 ft 2 in (1.88 m)	N/A	
Saylor Poffenbarger; G	Recruit ratings: ESPN: (94)				
Overall recruit ranking: ESPN: 2
Note: In many cases, Scout, Rivals, 247Sports, On3, and ESPN may conflict in their listings of height and weight.; In these cases, the average was taken. ESPN grades are on a 100-point scale.; Sources: "2021 Player Commits". ESPN. Archived from the original on September 27, 2021.

==== Recruiting class of 2022 ====
College recruiting (2022)
Name	Hometown	School	Height	Weight	Commit date
Isuneh Brady; PG	San Diego, CA	Cathedral Catholic High School	6 ft 3 in (1.91 m)	N/A	
Isuneh Brady; PG	Recruit ratings: ESPN: (98)				
Ayanna Patterson; SG	Fort Wayne, IN	Homestead High School	6 ft 2 in (1.88 m)	N/A	
Ayanna Patterson; SG	Recruit ratings: ESPN: (98)				
Overall recruit ranking:
Note: In many cases, Scout, Rivals, 247Sports, On3, and ESPN may conflict in their listings of height and weight.; In these cases, the average was taken. ESPN grades are on a 100-point scale.; Sources: "2022 Player Commits". ESPN. Archived from the original on September 7, 2021.

==== Recruiting class of 2023 ====
College recruiting (2023)
Name	Hometown	School	Height	Weight	Commit date
KK Arnold; PG	Germantown, WI	Germantown High School	5 ft 6 in (1.68 m)	N/A	
KK Arnold; PG	Recruit ratings: ESPN: (97)				
Ashlynn Shade; G	Noblesville, IN	Noblesville High School	5 ft 9 in (1.75 m)	N/A	
Ashlynn Shade; G	Recruit ratings: ESPN: (97)				
Overall recruit ranking:
Note: In many cases, Scout, Rivals, 247Sports, On3, and ESPN may conflict in their listings of height and weight.; In these cases, the average was taken. ESPN grades are on a 100-point scale.; Sources: "2023 Player Commits". ESPN. Archived from the original on December 6, 2021.

=== Coaching ===
Hall of Fame head coach Geno Auriemma and Hall of Fame associate head coach Chris Dailey returned for their 37th season coaching the team; Auriemma's contract was extended for five years in May. UConn assistant coach and former player Shea Ralph left the program in April to become the head coach at Vanderbilt, leaving assistant coach Jamelle Elliott on the bench. Elliott was an UConn assistant coach from 1998 to 2009 and returned after a nine-year head coaching stint at Cincinnati. Morgan Valley, a three-time national champion as a UConn player, was hired to fill the second assistant role. Since graduation Valley had been an assistant coach with several NCAA programs, and was head coach of the Hartford Hawks when hired to coach the Huskies.

== Season summary ==
At the season's outset, the Huskies returned several starters: seniors Christyn Williams, Olivia Nelson-Ododa, and Evina Westbrook, plus accomplished sophomore Paige Bueckers. Westbrook was eligible to enter the 2021 WNBA draft but chose to exercise her redshirt year option to play for the Huskies through her last year of eligibility. Two-time All-Big Ten forward Dorka Juhász, an Ohio State graduate transfer, was expected to add experience and depth in the post. Aubrey Griffin was the sole returning junior. Sophomores Nika Mühl, Aaliyah Edwards, Mir McLean, and Piath Gabriel returned. Highly touted freshman recruits Azzi Fudd, Amari DeBerry, Caroline Ducharme, and Saylor Poffenbarger were expected to compete for playing time.

In the season's opening weeks, Griffin was affected by a back problem and missed the entire year due to injury. Poffenbarger and McLean both announced transfers. Towards the end of the team's sixth game, Bueckers suffered a tibial plateau fracture and after surgery was forced to sit out most of the regular season, only returning before the Big East Conference tournament, where she played limited minutes. Guards Fudd and Mühl both suffered early season injuries which caused them to miss several games. Four canceled or postponed contests in December (due to pandemic or travel issues) allowed time for recovery. During the season, eight UConn players missed multiple games due to injury; with forwards Gabriel and DeBerry still in development, sometimes only six players were available for play. The only players able to compete in every regular season game were Westbrook and Edwards. Accordingly, the team tried eleven different starting lineups during the season, with nine different starters and eight different players leading a game in scoring. Caroline Ducharme assumed a scoring role originally anticipated for Fudd, but when Fudd returned both players continued to score effectively. With their scoring threats largely neutralized early in the season, the Huskies focused on defense, limiting their opponents to 54.2 points per game and collecting an average of 9.3 steals and 4.7 blocks per game. Mühl, the vocal floor leader of an aggressive and effective defense, was recognized as Big East Conference defensive player of the year. First team all-conference honors went to seniors Williams and Nelson-Ododa, with Ducharme on the second team. Both Fudd and Ducharme were named to the conference's all-freshman team. Williams won the Ann Meyers Drysdale Award as the best shooting guard in the country. UConn finished the regular season with a record of 22–5; they were 16–1 in conference play.

All the Huskies (except for Griffin) were back in playing condition by the time of the Big East Conference tournament, where they dominated all three games, including the tournament final against Villanova, the only Big East team that had defeated UConn during the regular season. In the first ever 68-team NCAA women's March Madness, UConn won games at the Storrs sub-regional against 15th seed Mercer and 7th seed Central Florida to advance to the Sweet Sixteen for a record 28th consecutive appearance. At the Bridgeport regional, the Huskies took a lead in the second quarter against 3rd seed Indiana and never looked back, advancing to a record 16th consecutive Elite Eight. In the regional finals against 1st seed North Carolina State, the teams battled through two overtimes in what game announcers called an "instant classic," and UConn won 91–87 to reach their 14th consecutive Final Four. Juhász suffered a fractured and dislocated wrist in that game and was out for the rest of the tournament. In the Final Four contest, UConn overcame defending national champion Stanford to advance to a rematch against no. 1 South Carolina in the final. In the national championship game, South Carolina jumped out to an 18-point lead while dominating the boards and held off scoring runs to defeat UConn. The Huskies finished the season with a record of 30–6 and were ranked 2nd in the final Coaches poll.

== Roster ==
2021–22 UConn Huskies women's basketball team
Players
Coaches

Pos.	#	Name	Height	Year	Previous school	Hometown
F	3	Aaliyah Edwards	6 ft 3 in (1.91 m)	So	Crestwood Preparatory	Kingston, Ontario
G	5	Paige Bueckers	5 ft 11 in (1.8 m)	So	Hopkins	Hopkins, MN
G	10	Nika Mühl	5 ft 10 in (1.78 m)	So	III. Gimnazija Zagreb	Zagreb, Croatia
F	11	Mir McLean (I)	5 ft 11 in (1.8 m)	So	Roland Park Country	Baltimore, MD
G	13	Christyn Williams	5 ft 11 in (1.8 m)	Sr	Central Arkansas Christian	Little Rock, AR
F	14	Dorka Juhász	6 ft 5 in (1.96 m)	GS	Ohio State	Pécs, Hungary
F	20	Olivia Nelson-Ododa	6 ft 5 in (1.96 m)	Sr	Winder-Barrow	Winder, GA
G	22	Evina Westbrook	6 ft 0 in (1.83 m)	RS Sr	Tennessee	Salem, OR
F	32	Piath Gabriel	6 ft 5 in (1.96 m)	So	Bradford Christian	Manchester, NH
G	33	Caroline Ducharme	6 ft 2 in (1.88 m)	Fr	Noble & Greenough	Milton, MA
G	35	Azzi Fudd	5 ft 11 in (1.8 m)	Fr	St. John's College HS	Arlington, VA
F	42	Amari DeBerry	6 ft 5 in (1.96 m)	Fr	Williamsville South	Williamsville, NY
F	44	Aubrey Griffin (injured) (redshirt)	6 ft 1 in (1.85 m)	Jr	Ossining	Ossining, NY

Head coach

- Geno Auriemma (West Chester)

Assistant coach(es)

- Chris Dailey (Rutgers)
- Jamelle Elliott (Connecticut)
- Morgan Valley (Connecticut)

Legend

- (C) Team captain
- (S) Suspended
- (I) Ineligible
- (W) Walk-on
- Injured
- Current redshirt

Roster
Last update: March 3, 2022

(Note: Mir McLean was only on the roster for the fall semester, after which she announced her intention to transfer.)

== Schedule ==
Date time, TV	Rank^{#}	Opponent^{#}	Result	Record	High points	High rebounds	High assists	Site (attendance) city, state
Exhibition
November 7, 2021*; 1:00 pm	No. 2	Fort Hays State; Exhibition game	W 111–47		20 – Williams	8 – Juhász	9 – Bueckers	Harry A. Gampel Pavilion (8,488); Storrs, CT
Regular season
November 14, 2021*; 1:00 pm, SNY	No. 2	Arkansas	W 95–80	1–0	34 – Bueckers	8 – Tied	5 – Westbrook	XL Center (9,359); Hartford, CT
November 20, 2021*; 12:00 pm, FloHoops	No. 2	vs. Minnesota; Battle 4 Atlantis tournament, quarterfinals	W 88–58	2–0	31 – Williams	8 – Nelson-Ododa	8 – Bueckers	Imperial Arena (1,175); Paradise Island, Bahamas
November 21, 2021*; 12:00 pm, FloHoops	No. 2	vs. No. 23 South Florida; Battle 4 Atlantis tournament, semifinals	W 60–53	3–0	21 – Bueckers	6 – Juhász	7 – Tied	Imperial Arena (1,124); Paradise Island, Bahamas
November 22, 2021*; 12:00 pm, ESPN	No. 2	vs. No. 1 South Carolina; Battle 4 Atlantis tournament, final	L 57–73	3–1	19 – Bueckers	5 – Tied	7 – Bueckers	Imperial Arena (1,171); Paradise Island, Bahamas
December 3, 2021; 7:00 pm, SNY	No. 2	at Seton Hall	W 74–49	4–1 (1–0)	23 – Bueckers	10 – Juhász	7 – Bueckers	Walsh Gymnasium (1,320); South Orange, NJ
December 5, 2021*; 12:00 pm, FS1	No. 2	No. 24 Notre Dame; Rivalry	W 73–54	5–1	22 – Bueckers	13 – Nelson-Ododa	6 – Williams	Harry A. Gampel Pavilion (10,167); Storrs, CT
December 9, 2021*; 7:00 pm, ESPN2	No. 3	at Georgia Tech	L 44–57	5–2	13 – Williams	10 – Nelson-Ododa	6 – Westbrook	McCamish Pavilion (4,587); Atlanta, GA
December 11, 2021*; 1:00 pm, ABC	No. 3	vs. UCLA; Never Forget Tribute Classic	W 71–61	6–2	17 – Westbrook	16 – Juhász	7 – Westbrook	Prudential Center (9,236); Newark, NJ
December 19, 2021*; 3:30 pm, ESPN	No. 7	vs. No. 6 Louisville; Basketball Hall of Fame Women's Showcase	L 64–69	6–3	24 – Ducharme	8 – Tied	4 – Nelson-Ododa	Mohegan Sun Arena (8,204); Uncasville, CT
January 5, 2022; 7:00 pm, SNY	No. 11	at Georgetown	Canceled due to the COVID-19 pandemic					McDonough Gymnasium; Washington, D.C.
January 7, 2022; 7:00 pm, SNY	No. 11	at Villanova	Canceled due to the COVID-19 pandemic					Finneran Pavilion; Villanova, PA
January 9, 2022; 1:00 pm, SNY	No. 11	Creighton	W 63–55	7–3 (2–0)	17 – Ducharme	7 – Nelson-Ododa	3 – Tied	Harry A. Gampel Pavilion (6,636); Storrs, CT
January 12, 2022; 7:00 pm, SNY	No. 10	at Butler	W 92–47	8–3 (3–0)	19 – Tied	7 – Tied	5 – Tied	Hinkle Fieldhouse (2,772); Indianapolis, IN
January 15, 2022; 12:00 pm, SNY	No. 10	Xavier	W 78–41	9–3 (4–0)	20 – Ducharme	8 – Juhász	5 – Tied	XL Center (7,827); Hartford, CT
January 17, 2022*; 5:00 pm, ESPN2	No. 9	at Oregon	L 59–72	9–4	22 – Ducharme	8 – Nelson-Ododa	6 – Nelson-Ododa	Matthew Knight Arena (9,439); Eugene, OR
January 21, 2022; 7:00 pm, SNY	No. 9	Seton Hall	W 71–38	10–4 (5–0)	17 – Nelson-Ododa	14 – Nelson-Ododa	5 – Nelson-Ododa	Harry A. Gampel Pavilion (6,326); Storrs, CT
January 23, 2022; 1:00 pm, SNY	No. 9	at St. John's	W 75–57	11–4 (6–0)	28 – Ducharme	18 – Nelson-Ododa	10 – Nelson-Ododa	Carnesecca Arena (945); Jamaica, NY
January 26, 2022; 8:00 pm, SNY	No. 10	at DePaul; Rescheduled from December 31	W 80–78	12–4 (7–0)	19 – Ducharme	12 – Juhász	5 – Mühl	Wintrust Arena (1,989); Chicago, IL
January 27, 2022*; 6:00 pm, ESPN	No. 10	at No. 1 South Carolina	Canceled					Colonial Life Arena; Columbia, SC
January 30, 2022; 7:30 pm, SNY	No. 10	at Providence	W 69–61	13–4 (8–0)	19 – Williams	7 – Williams	5 – Edwards	Alumni Hall (1,500); Providence, RI
February 2, 2022; 7:30 pm, SNY	No. 10	at Creighton	W 76–56	14–4 (9–0)	17 – Tied	14 – Nelson-Ododa	6 – Nelson-Ododa	D. J. Sokol Arena (2,279); Omaha, NE
February 4, 2022; 7:00 pm, SNY	No. 10	Butler	Canceled					Harry A. Gampel Pavilion; Storrs, CT
February 6, 2022*; 12:00 pm, FOX	No. 10	No. 7 Tennessee; Rivalry	W 75–56	15–4	25 – Fudd	7 – Edwards	5 – Mühl	XL Center (13,719); Hartford, CT
February 9, 2022; 7:00 pm, SNY	No. 8	Villanova	L 69–72	15–5 (9–1)	29 – Fudd	5 – Westbrook	6 – Mühl	XL Center (8,473); Hartford, CT
February 11, 2022; 7:00 pm, SNY	No. 8	DePaul	W 84–60	16–5 (10–1)	22 – Juhász	8 – Juhász	5 – Tied	Harry A. Gampel Pavilion (8,115); Storrs, CT
February 13, 2022; 2:30 pm, FOX	No. 8	at Marquette	W 72–58	17–5 (11–1)	24 – Fudd	7 – Edwards	6 – Mühl	Al McGuire Center (3,008); Milwaukee, WI
February 18, 2022; 7:00 pm, SNY	No. 10	at Xavier	W 89–35	18–5 (12–1)	13 – Williams	7 – Edwards	5 – Tied	Cintas Center (5,087); Cincinnati, OH
February 20, 2022; 2:00 pm, CBSSN	No. 10	Georgetown	W 90–49	19–5 (13–1)	19 – Williams	5 – Tied	5 – Williams	XL Center (10,114); Hartford, CT
February 23, 2022; 7:00 pm, SNY	No. 7	Marquette; Rescheduled from December 29	W 69–38	20–5 (14–1)	17 – Westbrook	6 – Nelson-Ododa	6 – Nelson-Ododa	XL Center (9,197); Hartford, CT
February 25, 2022; 7:00 pm, SNY	No. 7	St. John's	W 93–38	21–5 (15–1)	19 – Fudd	7 – Tied	10 – Westbrook	XL Center (9,154); Hartford, CT
February 27, 2022; 2:00 pm, CBSSN	No. 7	Providence	W 88–31	22–5 (16–1)	16 – Williams	10 – Juhász	5 – Bueckers	Harry A. Gampel Pavilion (10,167); Storrs, CT
Big East tournament
March 5, 2022; 12:00 pm, FS1	(1) No. 7	vs. (9) Georgetown; Quarterfinals	W 84–38	23–5	16 – Bueckers	7 – Tied	6 – Mühl	Mohegan Sun Arena (6,376); Uncasville, CT
March 6, 2022; 3:00 pm, FS1	(1) No. 7	vs. (5) Marquette; Semifinals	W 71–51	24–5	14 – Westbrook	11 – Edwards	3 – Tied	Mohegan Sun Arena (6,434); Uncasville, CT
March 7, 2022; 8:00 pm, FS1	(1) No. 6	vs. (2) Villanova; Championship	W 70–40	25–5	13 – Westbrook	6 – Nelson-Ododa	4 – Nelson-Ododa	Mohegan Sun Arena (6,459); Uncasville, CT
NCAA tournament
March 19, 2022*; 1:00 pm, ABC	(2 B) No. 5	(15 B) Mercer; First Round	W 83–38	26–5	13 – Williams	10 – Juhász	5 – Tied	Harry A. Gampel Pavilion (5,073); Storrs, CT
March 21, 2022*; 9:00 pm, ESPN	(2 B) No. 5	(7 B) No. 24 UCF; Second Round	W 52–47	27–5	16 – Fudd	5 – Tied	3 – Juhász	Harry A. Gampel Pavilion (10,167); Storrs, CT
March 26, 2022*; 2:00 pm, ESPN	(2 B) No. 5	vs. (3 B) No. 11 Indiana; Sweet Sixteen	W 75–58	28–5	15 – Tied	14 – Nelson-Ododa	3 – Tied	Total Mortgage Arena (8,502); Bridgeport, CT
March 28, 2022*; 7:00 pm, ESPN	(2 B) No. 5	vs. (1 B) No. 3 NC State; Elite Eight	W 91–87 ^{2OT}	29–5	27 – Bueckers	7 – Nelson-Ododa	4 – Nelson-Ododa	Total Mortgage Arena (10,119); Bridgeport, CT
April 1, 2022*; 9:30 pm, ESPN	(2 B) No. 5	vs. (1 S) No. 2 Stanford; Final Four / Rivalry	W 63–58	30–5	14 – Bueckers	10 – Nelson-Ododa	5 – Bueckers	Target Center (18,268); Minneapolis, MN
April 3, 2022*; 8:00 pm, ESPN	(2 B) No. 5	vs. (1 G) No. 1 South Carolina; National Championship	L 49–64	30–6	14 – Bueckers	6 – Bueckers	3 – Tied	Target Center (18,304); Minneapolis, MN
*Non-conference game. ^{#}Rankings from AP poll. (#) Tournament seedings in parentheses. All times are in EST.

== Rankings ==
Ranking movements Legend: ██ Increase in ranking ██ Decrease in ranking т = Tied with team above or below
	Week																			
Poll	Pre	1	2	3	4	5	6	7	8	9	10	11	12	13	14	15	16	17	18	Final
AP	2	2	3	2т	7	7т	11	11	11	10	9	10	10	8	10	7	7	6	5	Not released
Coaches	2т	2т^	2	2	3	6	11	11	11	11	12	9	9	8	11	8т	8	6	6	2

^ Coaches did not release a second poll at the same time as the AP.

== Player statistics ==
Player	Games played	Minutes	Field goals	Three pointers	Free throws	Rebounds	Assists	Blocks	Steals	Points
Christyn Williams	33	1,117	184	50	50	112	75	13	49	468
Evina Westbrook	36	988	117	39	50	133	113	8	50	323
Olivia Nelson-Ododa	33	898	119	3	62	246	116	55	39	303
Aaliyah Edwards	36	898	122	2	37	183	51	18	40	283
Nika Mühl	33	715	50	25	2	100	87	6	47	127
Azzi Fudd	25	698	107	58	31	67	24	17	25	303
Caroline Ducharme	31	650	121	34	27	99	40	17	27	303
Dorka Juhász	32	634	86	15	47	182	55	17	15	234
Paige Bueckers	17	497	105	18	20	68	67	11	25	248
Amari DeBerry	16	83	9	3	4	10	12	7	3	25
Piath Gabriel	13	64	17	0	5	25	3	0	1	39
Mir McLean	3	8	0	0	0	2	0	0	0	0

== See also ==
- 2021–22 UConn Huskies men's basketball team
