= 2021–22 Seton Hall Pirates women's basketball team =

Intercollegiate basketball season

2021–22 Seton Hall Pirates women's basketball

WNIT Runner-up
- Conference: Big East Conference
- Record: 24–13 (12–8 Big East)
- Head coach: Anthony Bozzella (9th season)
- Assistant coaches: Lauren DeFalco; Marissa Flagg; Jose Rebimbas
- Home arena: Walsh Gymnasium

2021–22 Big East women's basketball standings
	Conf.				Overall
Team	W		L	PCT	W		L	PCT
No. 5 UConn †	16	–	1	.941	30	–	6	.833
Villanova	15	–	4	.789	24	–	9	.727
Creighton	15	–	5	.750	23	–	10	.697
DePaul	14	–	6	.700	22	–	11	.667
Marquette	13	–	7	.650	23	–	11	.676
Seton Hall	12	–	8	.600	24	–	13	.649
St. John's	7	–	12	.368	12	–	19	.387
Providence	6	–	14	.300	11	–	19	.367
Georgetown	4	–	15	.211	10	–	19	.345
Xavier	4	–	16	.200	9	–	21	.300
Butler	0	–	18	.000	1	–	27	.036
† 2022 Big East tournament winner Rankings from AP poll

The 2021–22 Seton Hall Pirates women's basketball team represented Seton Hall University during the 2021–22 NCAA Division I women's basketball season. The Pirates, led by ninth year head coach Anthony Bozzella, played their home games in South Orange, New Jersey at the Walsh Gymnasium as members of the Big East Conference.

The Pirates finished in the middle of the Big East with a 12–8 record and lost to Villanova in the semifinals of the conference tournament. In postseason, Seton Hall was invited to the 2022 Women's National Invitation Tournament where they won five straight games to appear in the final.

== Previous season ==
The 2020–21 Pirates finished the season 14–7, 12–5 in Big East play to finish third place in the conference. They lost in the first round of the Big East women's tournament to Creighton.

== Roster ==
2021–22 Seton Hall Pirates women's basketball team
Players
Coaches

Pos.	#	Name	Height	Year	Previous school	Hometown
F	1	Skylar Treadwell	6 ft 1 in (1.85 m)	So	St. James	Martinsburg, WV
G	2	Danielle Robinson	5 ft 11 in (1.8 m)	RS Jr	University	Newark, NJ
G	3	Lauren Park-Lane	5 ft 6 in (1.68 m)	RS Jr	Sanford	Wilmington, DE
G/F	4	Andra Espinosa-Hunter	5 ft 11 in (1.8 m)	GS	Ossining	Ossining, NY
G	5	Mya Jackson	5 ft 7 in (1.7 m)	Jr	Wilmington	Wilmington, OH
F	10	Mya Bembry	6 ft 1 in (1.85 m)	Jr	West Orange	West Orange, NJ
F	14	Sidney Cooks	6 ft 4 in (1.93 m)	RS Sr	St. Joseph Catholic	Kenosha, WI
F	15	Katie Armstrong	6 ft 2 in (1.88 m)	GS	Perkiomen Valley	Collegeville, PA
G/F	20	Curtessia Dean	5 ft 10 in (1.78 m)	RS Jr	Wossman	Monroe, LA
G	22	Amari Wright	5 ft 9 in (1.75 m)	So	Sandalwood	Jacksonville, FL
G	23	Victoria Keenan	5 ft 7 in (1.7 m)	Jr	Northampton	Bethlehem, PA
F/C	33	Kailah Harris	6 ft 1 in (1.85 m)	Jr	Ossining	Ossining, NY
F	34	Ariel Cummings	6 ft 3 in (1.91 m)	Sr	Notre Dame Academy	Toledo, OH

Head coach

- Anthony Bozzella (Seton Hall)

Assistant coach(es)

- Lauren DeFalco (Iona)
- Marissa Flagg (Iona)
- Jose Rebimbas (Seton Hall)

Legend

- (C) Team captain
- (S) Suspended
- (I) Ineligible
- (W) Walk-on
- Injured
- Current redshirt

Roster
Last update: January 26, 2022

== Schedule ==
Date time, TV	Rank^{#}	Opponent^{#}	Result	Record	Site (attendance) city, state
Exhibition
November 5, 2021*; 12:00 pm		St. Thomas Aquinas	W 107–50		Walsh Gymnasium; South Orange, NJ
Regular season
November 9, 2021*; 7:00 pm		Mount St. Mary's	W 81–68	1–0	Walsh Gymnasium (581); South Orange, NJ
November 13, 2021*; 11:30 am		Fordham	L 63–82	1–1	Walsh Gymnasium; South Orange, NJ
November 16, 2021*; 7:00 pm		Lehigh	W 87–77	2–1	Walsh Gymnasium; South Orange, NJ
November 25, 2021*; 4:00 pm		vs. USC; Hard Rock Riviera Maya	L 65–79	2–2	Cancun, Mexico
November 26, 2021*; 4:00 pm		vs. Toledo; Hard Rock Riviera Maya	W 68–63 ^{OT}	3–2	Cancun, Mexico
December 1, 2021*; 12:00 pm		Iona	Canceled due to the COVID-19 pandemic		Walsh Gymnasium; South Orange, NJ
December 3, 2021; 7:00 pm		No. 2 UConn	L 49–74	3–3 (0–1)	Walsh Gymnasium; South Orange, NJ
December 5, 2021; 2:00 pm		at St. John's	L 75–88	3–4 (0–2)	Carnesecca Arena; Jamaica, NY
December 11, 2021*; 12:00 pm		at Princeton	W 70–60	4–4	Jadwin Gymnasium; Princeton, New Jersey
December 14, 2021*; 6:00 pm		Central Florida	L 56–68	4–5	Walsh Gymnasium; South Orange, NJ
December 19, 2021; 12:00 pm, FS1		Marquette	W 69–57	5–5 (1–2)	Walsh Gymnasium (608); South Orange, NJ
December 21, 2021*; 12:00 pm		Wagner	W 70–62	6–5	Walsh Gymnasium; South Orange, NJ
December 31, 2021; 7:00 pm		at Villanova	L 73–76	6–6 (1–3)	Finneran Pavilion; Villanova, PA
January 4, 2022*; 7:00 pm		Towson	Canceled due to the COVID-19 pandemic		Walsh Gymnasium; South Orange, NJ
January 14, 2022; 7:30 pm		at Creighton	L 60–83	6–7 (1–4)	D. J. Sokol Arena; Omaha, NE
January 16, 2022; 1:00 pm		at Providence	W 62–42	7–7 (2–4)	Alumni Hall; Providence, RI
January 19, 2022; 7:00 pm		St. John's	W 84–79	8–7 (3–4)	Walsh Gymnasium; South Orange, NJ
January 21, 2022; 7:00 pm		at No. 9 UConn	L 38–71	8–8 (3–5)	Harry A. Gampel Pavilion (6,326); Storrs, CT
January 26, 2022; 8:00 pm		at Marquette	L 43–62	8–9 (3–6)	Al McGuire Center (1,064); Milwaukee, WI
January 30, 2022; 7:00 pm		DePaul	L 65–85	8–10 (3–7)	Walsh Gymnasium; South Orange, NJ
February 2, 2022; 7:00 pm, BEDN		Georgetown	W 91–62	9–10 (4–7)	Walsh Gymnasium (694); South Orange, NJ
February 4, 2022; 1:00 pm		Xavier	W 91–86	10–10 (5–7)	Walsh Gymnasium; South Orange, NJ
February 6, 2022; 2:00 pm		at Butler	W 72–56	11–10 (6–7)	Hinkle Fieldhouse; Indianapolis, IN
February 9, 2022; 7:00 pm, BEDN		at Georgetown	W 60–50	12–10 (7–7)	McDonough Gymnasium (945); Washington, DC
February 13, 2022; 1:00 pm		Villanova	W 72–60	13–10 (8–7)	Walsh Gymnasium (1051); South Orange, NJ
February 18, 2022; 7:00 pm		Providence	W 62–52	14–10 (9–7)	Walsh Gymnasium (560); South Orange, NJ
February 20, 2022; 1:00 pm		Creighton; Senior Day	L 91–97 ^{2OT}	14–11 (9–8)	Walsh Gymnasium (744); South Orange, NJ
February 22, 2022; 2:00 pm		Butler	W 84–55	15–11 (10–8)	Walsh Gymnasium (426); South Orange, NJ
February 25, 2022; 8:00 pm		at DePaul	W 94–90	16–11 (11–8)	Wintrust Arena (1219); Chicago, IL
March 1, 2022; 2:00 pm		at Xavier	W 76–53	17–11 (12–8)	Cintas Center (156); Cincinnati, OH
Big East Women's Tournament
March 4, 2022; 4:00 pm		vs. (11) Butler; First round	W 58–39	18–11	Mohegan Sun Arena; Uncasville, CT
March 5, 2022; 9:30 pm		vs. (3) Creighton; Quarterfinals	W 66–65	19–11	Mohegan Sun Arena; Uncasville, CT
March 6, 2022; 5:30 pm		at (2) Villanova; Semifinals	L 55–64	19–12	Mohegan Sun Arena; Uncasville, CT
WNIT
March 17, 2022*; 7:00 pm		Fairleigh Dickinson; First round	W 67–45	20–12	Walsh Gymnasium (429); South Orange, NJ
March 21, 2022*; 7:00 pm		Virginia Commonwealth; Second round	W 70–67	21–12	Walsh Gymnasium (519); South Orange, NJ
March 24, 2022*; 7:00 pm		Drexel; Third round	W 78–71	22–12	Walsh Gymnasium (593); South Orange, NJ
March 28, 2022*; 8:00 pm		at Columbia; Quarterfinals	W 78–75	23–12	Levien Gymnasium (2072); New York City, NY
March 31, 2022*; 7:30 pm		at Middle Tennessee; Semifinals	W 74–73	24–12	Murphy Center (4022); Murfreesboro, TN
April 2, 2022*; 3:00 pm, CBSSN		at South Dakota State; Championship	L 50–82	24–13	Frost Arena; Brookings, SD
*Non-conference game. ^{#}Rankings from AP Poll. (#) Tournament seedings in parentheses. All times are in Eastern Time.

== See also ==
- 2021–22 Seton Hall Pirates men's basketball team
