= 2021–22 Providence Friars women's basketball team =

Intercollegiate basketball season

2021–22 Providence Friars women's basketball
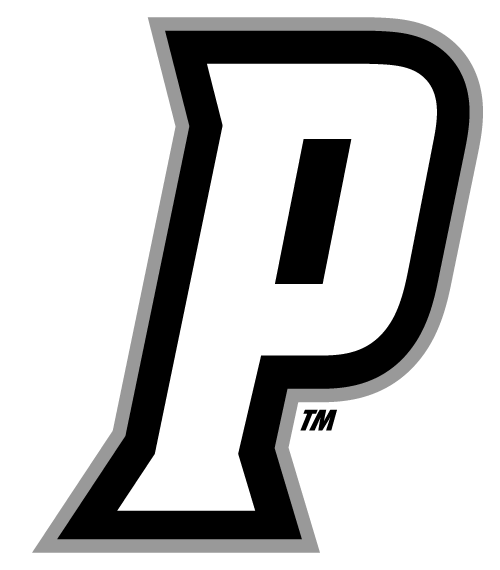
- Conference: Big East
- Record: 10–14 (5–10 Big East)
- Head coach: Jim Crowley (6th season)
- Assistant coaches: Tiara Johnson; Jessica Jenkins; Kelcie Rombach
- Home arena: Alumni Hall

2021–22 Big East women's basketball standings
	Conf.				Overall
Team	W		L	PCT	W		L	PCT
No. 5 UConn †	16	–	1	.941	30	–	6	.833
Villanova	15	–	4	.789	24	–	9	.727
Creighton	15	–	5	.750	23	–	10	.697
DePaul	14	–	6	.700	22	–	11	.667
Marquette	13	–	7	.650	23	–	11	.676
Seton Hall	12	–	8	.600	24	–	13	.649
St. John's	7	–	12	.368	12	–	19	.387
Providence	6	–	14	.300	11	–	19	.367
Georgetown	4	–	15	.211	10	–	19	.345
Xavier	4	–	16	.200	9	–	21	.300
Butler	0	–	18	.000	1	–	27	.036
† 2022 Big East tournament winner Rankings from AP poll

The 2021–22 Providence Friars women's basketball team represent Providence College in the 2021–22 NCAA Division I women's basketball season. The Friars, led by sixth year head coach Jim Crowley, play their home games at Alumni Hall and are members of the Big East Conference.

== Roster ==
2021–22 Providence Friars women's basketball team
Players
Coaches

Pos.	#	Name	Height	Year	Previous school	Hometown
G	1	Kylee Sheppard	5 ft 10 in (1.78 m)	Fr	Roger Bacon	Cincinnati, OH
G	2	Grace Efosa-Aguebor	5 ft 11 in (1.8 m)	So	Whittier Tech	Lawrence, MA
G	3	Megan Huerter	5 ft 11 in (1.8 m)	Fr	Shenendehowa	Clifton, NY
G	5	Janai Crooms	5 ft 10 in (1.78 m)	Jr	St. Andrews	Cranston, RI
F	10	Mary Baskerville	6 ft 3 in (1.91 m)	Sr	Enfield	Enfield, CT
G	11	Nariah Scott	5 ft 10 in (1.78 m)	Fr	Tabor	Holden, MA
G/F	15	Lauren Sampson	6 ft 0 in (1.83 m)	Jr	Waltham	Waltham, MA
G	23	Julia Fabozzi	6 ft 1 in (1.85 m)	So	Xaverian	Staten Island, NY
G	24	Audrey Koch	5 ft 10 in (1.78 m)	Fr	Iowa City West	Iowa City, IA
F	31	Olivia Olsen	6 ft 3 in (1.91 m)	Fr	Niskayuna	Niskayuna, NY
F	32	Alyssa Geary	6 ft 4 in (1.93 m)	Sr	Nazareth	Elmhurst, IL
F	33	Emily Archibald	6 ft 0 in (1.83 m)	Fr	Kennebunk	Kennebunk, MA

Head coach

- Jim Crowley (Keuka)

Assistant coach(es)

- Tiara Johnson (St. Bonaventure)
- Jessica Jenkins (St. Bonaventure)
- Kelcie Rombach (St. Bonaventure)

Legend

- (C) Team captain
- (S) Suspended
- (I) Ineligible
- (W) Walk-on
- Injured
- Current redshirt

Roster
Last update: February 16, 2022

== Schedule ==
Date time, TV	Rank^{#}	Opponent^{#}	Result	Record	Site (attendance) city, state
Exhibition
Nov 4, 2021*; 7:00 pm		Bentley	W 64–46		Alumni Hall; Providence, RI
Non-conference regular season
Nov 9, 2021*; 4:00 pm		Yale	L 57–63 ^{OT}	0–1	Alumni Hall (456); Providence, RI
Nov 13, 2021*; 1:00 pm		at Maine	W 66–61 ^{OT}	1–1	Cross Insurance Center (978); Bangor, ME
Nov 17, 2021*; 7:00 pm		Rhode Island	L 53–66	1–2	Alumni Hall (500); Providence, RI
Nov 20, 2021*; 1:00 pm		Boston College	L 73–85	1–3	Alumni Hall (426); Providence, RI
Nov 23, 2021*; 4:00 pm, FloHoops		UMass	L 62–80	1–4	Alumni Hall (225); Providence, RI
Nov 28, 2021*; 1:00 pm		Monmouth	W 64–34	2–4	Alumni Hall (225); Providence, RI
Dec 1, 2021*; 7:00 pm		Hartford	W 73–62	3–4	Alumni Hall (187); Providence, RI
Big East regular season
Dec 3, 2021; 7:00 pm		Villanova	W 66–47	4–4 (1–0)	Alumni Hall (358); Providence, RI
Dec 5, 2021; 1:00 pm, BEDN		Georgetown	L 47–55	4–5 (1–1)	Alumni Hall (262); Providence, RI
Dec 8, 2021*; 6:00 pm, ESPN+		Brown	W 59–43	5–5	Pizzitola Sports Center (270); Providence, RI
Dec 11, 2021*; 1:00 pm		Quinnipiac	W 68–50	6–5	Alumni Hall (213); Providence, RI
Dec 19, 2021; 1:00 pm, BEDN		Creighton	L 56–71	6–6 (1–2)	Alumni Hall (180); Providence, RI
Dec 31, 2021; 1:00 pm		at Xavier	Postponed - Game rescheduled to January 11		Cintas Center; Cincinnati, OH
Jan 2, 2022; 12:00 pm, FS1		at Butler; Covid issues within the Providence program. Rescheduled for Feb. 16			Hinkle Fieldhouse; Indianapolis, IN
Jan 7, 2022; 7:00 pm		DePaul	L 77–98	6–7 (1–3)	Alumni Hall (203); Providence, RI
Jan 11, 2022; 7:00 pm, BEDN/FloSports		at Xavier; Rescheduled from December 31	W 54–49	7–7 (2–3)	Cintas Center (429); Cincinnati, OH
Jan 14, 2022; 1:00 pm		St. John's	W 56–49	8–7 (3–3)	Alumni Hall (125); Providence, RI
Jan 16, 2022; 1:00 pm		Seton Hall	L 42–62	8–8 (3–4)	Alumni Hall (236); Providence, RI
Jan 21, 2022; 7:00 pm		at Villanova	L 56–71	8–9 (3–5)	Finneran Pavilion (1,009); Villanova, PA
Jan 23, 2022; 2:00 pm, BEDN		at Georgetown	W 66–58 ^{OT}	9–9 (4–5)	McDonough Gymnasium; Washington, D.C.
Jan 28, 2022; 5:00 pm, BEDN		at Creighton	L 71–95	9–10 (4–6)	D. J. Sokol Arena (1,018); Omaha, NE
Jan 30, 2022; 7:30 pm, SNY		No. 10 UConn	L 61–69	9–11 (4–7)	Alumni Hall (1,500); Providence, RI
Feb 4, 2022; 8:00 pm		at Marquette	L 59–61	9–12 (4–8)	Al McGuire Center (1,344); Milwaukee, WI
Feb 6, 2022; 3:00 pm		at DePaul	L 67–88	9–13 (4–9)	Wintrust Arena (1,313); Chicago, IL
Feb 11, 2022; 7:00 pm, BEDN		Butler	W 64–53	10–13 (5–9)	Alumni Hall (364); Providence, RI
Feb 13, 2022; 12:00 pm, FS1		Xavier	L 60–62	10–14 (5–10)	Alumni Hall (312); Providence, RI
Feb 16, 2022; 7:00 pm, BEDN		at Butler; Rescheduled from January 2	W 69–41	11–14 (6–10)	Hinkle Fieldhouse (518); Indianapolis, IN
Feb 18, 2022; 7:00 pm		at Seton Hall	L 52–62	11–15 (6–11)	Walsh Gymnasium (560); South Orange, NJ
Feb 20, 2022; 1:00 pm		at St. John's	L 62–68 ^{OT}	11–16 (6–12)	Carnesecca Arena (407); Queens, NY
Feb 25, 2022; 7:00 pm		Marquette	L 51–57	11–17 (6–13)	Alumni Hall (451); Providence, RI
Feb 27, 2022; 2:00 pm, CBSSN		at No. 7 UConn	L 31–88	11–18 (6–14)	Harry A. Gampel Pavilion (10,167); Storrs, CT
Big East tournament
Mar 4, 2022; 11:00 am, BEDN/FloHoops	(8)	vs. (9) Georgetown; First Round	L 55–68	11–19	Mohegan Sun Arena; Uncasville, CT
*Non-conference game. ^{#}Rankings from AP Poll. (#) Tournament seedings in parentheses. All times are in Eastern.

== See also ==
- 2021–22 Providence Friars men's basketball team
