= 2021–22 Creighton Bluejays women's basketball team =

Intercollegiate basketball season

2021–22 Creighton Bluejays women's basketball

NCAA tournament, Elite Eight
- Conference: Big East
- Record: 23–10 (15–5 Big East)
- Head coach: Jim Flanery (20th season)
- Assistant coaches: Linda Sayavongchanh; Carli Berger; Jordann Reese
- Home arena: D. J. Sokol Arena

2021–22 Big East women's basketball standings
	Conf.				Overall
Team	W		L	PCT	W		L	PCT
No. 5 UConn †	16	–	1	.941	30	–	6	.833
Villanova	15	–	4	.789	24	–	9	.727
Creighton	15	–	5	.750	23	–	10	.697
DePaul	14	–	6	.700	22	–	11	.667
Marquette	13	–	7	.650	23	–	11	.676
Seton Hall	12	–	8	.600	24	–	13	.649
St. John's	7	–	12	.368	12	–	19	.387
Providence	6	–	14	.300	11	–	19	.367
Georgetown	4	–	15	.211	10	–	19	.345
Xavier	4	–	16	.200	9	–	21	.300
Butler	0	–	18	.000	1	–	27	.036
† 2022 Big East tournament winner Rankings from AP poll

The 2021–22 Creighton Bluejays women's basketball team represented Creighton University in the 2021–22 NCAA Division I women's basketball season. The Bluejays, led by 20th year head coach Jim Flanery, played their home games at D. J. Sokol Arena and were members of the Big East Conference.

== Roster ==
2021–22 Creighton Bluejays women's basketball team
Players
Coaches

Pos.	#	Name	Height	Year	Previous school	Hometown
G	2	Tatum Rembao	5 ft 9 in (1.75 m)	Sr	Loveland	Loveland, CO
G	4	Lexi Unruh	6 ft 1 in (1.85 m)	Fr	Sioux Falls Christian	Sioux Falls, SD
G	12	Jayme Horan	5 ft 10 in (1.78 m)	So	Millard South	Omaha, NE
G	13	Rachel Saunders	5 ft 9 in (1.75 m)	Sr	Iowa City West	Iowa City, IA
F	14	Mallory Brake	6 ft 0 in (1.83 m)	So	Hastings	Hastings, MN
G	15	Lauren Jensen	5 ft 10 in (1.78 m)	Sr	Lakeville North	Lakeville, MN
G	21	Molly Mogensen	5 ft 7 in (1.7 m)	So	Farmington	Farmington, MN
G/F	22	Carly Bachelor	6 ft 0 in (1.83 m)	Jr	Washburn Rural	Topeka, KS
G	24	Chloe Dworak	5 ft 6 in (1.68 m)	Sr	Lincoln Christian	Lincoln, NE
G/F	30	Morgan Maly	6 ft 1 in (1.85 m)	So	Crete	Crete, NE
F	31	Emma Ronsiek	6 ft 1 in (1.85 m)	So	O'Gorman	Sioux Falls, SD
G	33	Payton Brotski	5 ft 11 in (1.8 m)	Sr	Platteview	Papillion, NE

Head coach

- Jim Flanery (Creighton)

Assistant coach(es)

- Linda Sayavongchanh (Drake)
- Carli Berger (Creighton)
- Jordann Reese (Drake)

Legend

- (C) Team captain
- (S) Suspended
- (I) Ineligible
- (W) Walk-on
- Injured
- Current redshirt

Roster
Last update: February 21, 2022

== Schedule ==
Date time, TV	Rank^{#}	Opponent^{#}	Result	Record	High points	High rebounds	High assists	Site (attendance) city, state
Exhibition
November 3, 2021*; 7:00 pm		Wayne State	W 99–46		–	–	–	D. J. Sokol Arena; Omaha, NE
Regular season
November 10, 2021*; 6:00 pm		at Drake	L 79–82	0–1	15 – Maly	5 – Horan	4 – Tied	Knapp Center (1,850); Des Moines IA
November 13, 2021*; 1:00 pm, FloSports		Omaha	W 71–51	1–1	16 – Jensen	7 – Bachelor	8 – Mogenson	D. J. Sokol Arena (879); Omaha, NE
November 17, 2021*; 7:00 pm		at Nebraska	L 62–67	1–2	17 – Bachelor	11 – Bachelor	2 – Tied	Pinnacle Bank Arena (4,042); Lincoln, NE
November 21, 2021*; 7:00 pm, FloSports		South Dakota State	W 67–55	2–2	18 – Ronsik	9 – Ronsiek	8 – Rembao	D. J. Sokol Arena (864); Omaha, NE
November 27, 2021*; 1:00 pm, FloSports		Northern Iowa	W 79–72	3–2	25 – Ronsiek	5 – Tied	8 – Rembao	D. J. Sokol Arena (792); Omaha, NE
December 3, 2021; 12:00 pm, BEDN		Georgetown	W 64–38	4–2 (1–0)	12 – Maly	6 – Tied	6 – Rembao	D. J. Sokol Arena (416); Omaha, NE
December 5, 2021; 1:00 pm, BEDN		Villanova	W 72–58	5–2 (2–0)	23 – Jensen	7 – Brotski	4 – Tied	D. J. Sokol Arena (581); Omaha, NE
December 12, 2021*; 1:00 pm, FloSports		Arizona State	W 69–62	6–2	23 – Bachelor	5 – Bachelor	7 – Rembao	D. J. Sokol Arena (735); Omaha, NE
December 16, 2021*; 6:30 pm, FloSports		South Dakota	L 71–73	6–3	23 – Ronsiek	4 – Tied	6 – Rembao	D. J. Sokol Arena (1,067); Omaha, NE
December 19, 2021; 1:00 pm, BEDN		Providence	W 71–56	7–3 (3–0)	19 – Jensen	10 – Bachelor	5 – Rembao	Alumni Hall (180); Providence, RI
December 21, 2021*; 1:00 pm, SECN+		at Arkansas	W 81–72	8–3	20 – Maly	7 – Modensen	11 – Rembao	Bud Walton Arena (3,216); Fayetteville, AR
December 31, 2021; 1:00 pm, BEDN		at Butler	Postponed due to COVID-19					Hinkle Fieldhouse; Indianapolis, IN
January 2, 2022; 1:00 pm, BEDN		at Xavier	W 67–51	9–3 (4–0)	14 – Tied	7 – Jensen	6 – Ronsiek	Cintas Center (349); Cincinnati, OH
January 7, 2022; 6:30 pm, BEDN		Marquette	W 62–45	10–3 (5–0)	15 – Jensen	6 – Ronsiek	3 – Tied	D. J. Sokol Arena (986); Omaha, NE
January 9, 2022; 12:00 pm, SNY		at No. 11 UConn	L 55–63	10–4 (5–1)	14 – Maly	5 – Tied	3 – Tied	Harry A. Gampel Pavilion (6,636); Storrs, CT
January 14, 2022; 6:30 pm, BEDN		Seton Hall	W 83–60	11–4 (6–1)	27 – Ronsiek	6 – Ronsiek	11 – Rembao	D. J. Sokol Arena (843); Omaha, NE
January 16, 2022; 1:00 pm, BEDN		St. John's	W 86–80	12–4 (7–1)	30 – Ronsiek	6 – Ronsiek	12 – Rembao	D. J. Sokol Arena (1,221); Omaha, NE
January 19, 2022; 5:00 pm, BEDN		at Butler; Rescheduled from December 31	W 95–44	13–4 (8–1)	20 – Ronsiek	6 – Tied	7 – Rembao	Hinkle Fieldhouse (386); Indianapolis, IN
January 21, 2022; 6:00 pm, BEDN		at Georgetown	W 80–70	14–4 (9–1)	22 – Jensen	8 – Ronsiek	6 – Jensen	McDonough Gymnasium; Washington, DC
January 23, 2022; 1:00 pm, BEDN		at Villanova	L 64–74	14–5 (9–2)	16 – Ronsiek	6 – Rembao	7 – Rembao	Finneran Pavilion (759); Villanova, PA
January 28, 2022; 4:00 pm, BEDN		Providence	W 95–71	15–5 (10–2)	20 – Jensen	5 – Brake	8 – Rembao	D. J. Sokol Arena (1,018); Omaha, NE
February 2, 2022; 6:30 pm, SNY		No. 10 UConn	L 56–76	15–6 (10–3)	15 – Mogensen	5 – Maly	4 – Rembao	D. J. Sokol Arena (2,279); Omaha, NE
February 4, 2022; 7:00 pm, BEDN		at DePaul	W 77–68	16–6 (11–3)	23 – Ronsiek	7 – Rembao	4 – Mogensen	Wintrust Arena (949); Chicago, IL
February 6, 2022; 1:00 pm, BEDN		at Marquette	L 47–50	16–7 (11–4)	14 – Maly	7 – Saunders	6 – Rembao	Al McGuire Center (1,719); Milwaukee, WI
February 11, 2022; 6:30 pm, BEDN		Xavier	W 68–47	17–7 (12–4)	18 – Jensen	8 – Ronsiek	8 – Rembao	D. J. Sokol Arena (1,249); Omaha, NE
February 13, 2022; 1:00 pm, BEDN		Butler; Pink Out Game	W 96–49	18–7 (13–4)	23 – Jensen	10 – Bachelor	10 – Rembao	D. J. Sokol Arena (1,184); Omaha, NE
February 18, 2022; 1:00 pm, BEDN		at St. John's	W 107–59	19–7 (14–4)	16 – Tied	5 – Ronsiek	10 – Rembao	Carnesecca Arena (385); Jamaica, NY
February 20, 2022; 1:00 pm, BEDN		at Seton Hall	W 97–91 ^{2OT}	20–7 (15–4)	26 – Ronsiek	13 – Ronsiek	5 – Rembao	Walsh Gymnasium (744); South Orange, NJ
February 27, 2022; 11:00 am, FS1		DePaul	L 84–90	20–8 (15–5)	19 – Ronsiek	9 – Ronsiek	9 – Mogensen	D. J. Sokol Arena (1,049); Omaha, NE
Big East Tournament
March 5, 2022; 1:00 pm, FS1	(4)	vs. (5) Seton Hall; Quarterfinals	L 65–66	20–9	13 – Ronsiek	7 – Jensen	6 – Ronsiek	Mohegan Sun Arena; Uncasville, CT
NCAA Tournament
March 18, 2022*; 1:00 pm, ESPNews	(10 G)	vs. (7 G) Colorado; First Round	W 84–74	21–9	20 – Maly	8 – Maly	3 – Tied	Carver-Hawkeye Arena (14,382); Iowa City, IA
March 20, 2022*; 12:00 pm, ABC	(10 G)	at (2 G) No. 8 Iowa; Second Round	W 64–62	22–9	19 – Jensen	13 – Maly	5 – Rembao	Carver-Hawkeye Arena (14,382); Iowa City, IA
March 25, 2022*; 8:30 pm, ESPN2	(10 G)	vs. (3 G) No. 10 Iowa State; Sweet Sixteen	W 76–68	23–9	21 – Maly	8 – Jensen	4 – Rembao	Greensboro Coliseum (8,811); Greensboro, NC
March 27, 2022*; 6:00 pm, ESPN	(10 G)	vs. (1 G) No. 1 South Carolina; Elite Eight	L 50–80	23–10	12 – Jensen	4 – Saunders	6 – Rembao	Greensboro Coliseum (6,579); Greensboro, NC
*Non-conference game. ^{#}Rankings from AP Poll. (#) Tournament seedings in parentheses. All times are in Central.

== See also ==
- 2021–22 Creighton Bluejays men's basketball team
