= 2021–22 Villanova Wildcats women's basketball team =

American college basketball season

2021–22 Villanova Wildcats women's basketball

NCAA tournament, second round
- Conference: Big East Conference
- Record: 24–9 (15–4 Big East)
- Head coach: Denise Dillon (2nd season)
- Assistant coaches: Joe Mullaney; Michelle Sword; Mary Wooley
- Home arena: Finneran Pavilion

2021–22 Big East women's basketball standings
	Conf.				Overall
Team	W		L	PCT	W		L	PCT
No. 5 UConn †	16	–	1	.941	30	–	6	.833
Villanova	15	–	4	.789	24	–	9	.727
Creighton	15	–	5	.750	23	–	10	.697
DePaul	14	–	6	.700	22	–	11	.667
Marquette	13	–	7	.650	23	–	11	.676
Seton Hall	12	–	8	.600	24	–	13	.649
St. John's	7	–	12	.368	12	–	19	.387
Providence	6	–	14	.300	11	–	19	.367
Georgetown	4	–	15	.211	10	–	19	.345
Xavier	4	–	16	.200	9	–	21	.300
Butler	0	–	18	.000	1	–	27	.036
† 2022 Big East tournament winner Rankings from AP poll

The 2021–22 Villanova Wildcats women's basketball team represented Villanova University in the 2021–22 NCAA Division I women's basketball season. The Wildcats, led by 2nd-year head coach Denise Dillon, played their home games at the Finneran Pavilion and were members of the Big East Conference.

== Roster ==
2021–22 Villanova Wildcats women's basketball team
Players
Coaches

Pos.	#	Name	Height	Year	Previous school	Hometown
G	1	Zanai Jones	5 ft 6 in (1.68 m)	Fr	Hudson Catholic	Jersey City, NJ
G	2	Kaitlyn Orihel	5 ft 10 in (1.78 m)	Fr	Archbishop Wood	Newtown, PA
G	3	Lucy Olsen	5 ft 9 in (1.75 m)	Fr	Spring-Ford	Royersford, PA
G	4	Kenzie Gardler	5 ft 4 in (1.63 m)	Jr	Cardinal O'Hara	Broomall, PA
G	5	Anahi-Lee Cauley	6 ft 0 in (1.83 m)	Fr	Kent	Windsor, CT
F	10	Christina Dalce	6 ft 2 in (1.88 m)	Fr	Rutgers Prep	Edison, NJ
F	12	Lior Garzon	6 ft 1 in (1.85 m)	So	Hof Hasharon	Ra'anana, Israel
F	14	Brianna Herlihy	6 ft 0 in (1.83 m)	GS	Braintree	Braintree, MA
G	15	Brooke Mullin	5 ft 11 in (1.8 m)	Jr	Neshaminy	Langhorne, PA
F	20	Maddy Siegrist	6 ft 1 in (1.85 m)	Jr	Our Lady Of Lourdes	Poughkeepsie, NY
F/C	21	Kylie Swider	6 ft 4 in (1.93 m)	So	Tabor	Portsmouth, RI
G	32	Bella Runyun	5 ft 11 in (1.8 m)	So	Moorestown Friends	Moorestown, NJ

Head coach

- Denise Dillon (Villanova)

Assistant coach(es)

- Joe Mullaney (Providence)
- Michelle Sword (Saint Joseph's)
- Mary Wooley (USC Aiken)

Legend

- (C) Team captain
- (S) Suspended
- (I) Ineligible
- (W) Walk-on
- Injured
- Current redshirt

Roster
Last update: February 20, 2022

== Schedule ==
Date time, TV	Rank^{#}	Opponent^{#}	Result	Record	Site (attendance) city, state
Exhibition
November 1, 2021*; 7:00 pm		IUP	W 93–44		Finneran Pavilion; Villanova, PA
Regular season
November 10, 2021*; 7:00 pm		Princeton	L 42–59	0–1	Finneran Pavilion (1,551); Villanova, PA
November 12, 2021*; 7:00 pm, BTN+		at No. 4 Maryland	L 67–88	0–2	Xfinity Center (5,150); College Park, MD
November 20, 2021*; 3:00 pm, ESPN+		at Saint Joseph's	W 55–39	1–2	Hagan Arena (1,400); Philadelphia, PA
November 22, 2021*; 7:00 pm, ESPN+		at Penn	W 66–63	2–2	Palestra (310); Philadelphia, PA
November 27, 2021*; 2:00 pm		Temple	L 62–68	2–3	Finneran Pavilion (655); Villanova, PA
December 1, 2021*; 7:00 pm		Lehigh	W 65–60	3–3	Finneran Pavilion (719); Villanova, PA
December 3, 2021; 7:00 pm		at Providence	L 47–66	3–4 (0–1)	Alumni Hall (358); Providence, RI
December 5, 2021; 2:00 pm		at Creighton	L 58–72	3–5 (0–2)	D. J. Sokol Arena (581); Omaha, NE
December 9, 2021*; 7:00 pm		at James Madison	W 76–67	4–5	Atlantic Union Bank Center (2,336); Harrisonburg, VA
December 12, 2021*; 1:00 pm		No. 23 Oregon State	W 56–52	5–5	Finneran Pavilion (905); Villanova, PA
December 21, 2021*; 1:00 pm, ESPN+		at La Salle	W 66–56	6–5	Tom Gola Arena (472); Philadelphia, PA
December 31, 2021; 2:00 pm		Seton Hall	W 76–73	7–5 (1–2)	Finneran Pavilion (907); Villanova, PA
January 2, 2022; 12:00 pm, FS1		St. John's	W 70–68	8–5 (2–2)	Finneran Pavilion (658); Villanova, PA
January 7, 2022; 7:00 pm, SNY		No. 11 UConn	Canceled due to the COVID-19 pandemic		Finneran Pavilion; Villanova, PA
January 14, 2022; 6:30 pm, FS2		at DePaul	L 63–75	8–6 (2–3)	Wintrust Arena (819); Chicago, IL
January 16, 2022; 2:00 pm, CBSSN		at Marquette	W 58–55	9–6 (3–3)	Al McGuire Center (1,276); Milwaukee, WI
January 21, 2022; 7:00 pm		Providence	W 71–56	10–6 (4–3)	Finneran Pavilion (1,009); Villanova, PA
January 23, 2022; 1:00 pm		Creighton	W 74–64	11–6 (5–3)	Finneran Pavilion (759); Villanova, PA
January 28, 2022; 12:00 pm		Butler	W 59–44	12–6 (6–3)	Finneran Pavilion (519); Villanova, PA
January 30, 2022; 2:00 pm		Xavier	W 82–57	13–6 (7–3)	Finneran Pavilion (1,209); Villanova, PA
February 4, 2022; 2:00 pm		at St. John's	W 82–58	14–6 (8–3)	Carnesecca Arena (658); Queens, NY
February 6, 2022; 7:00 pm, BEDN		Georgetown	W 76–57	15–6 (9–3)	Finneran Pavilion (1,009); Villanova, PA
February 9, 2022; 7:00 pm, SNY		at No. 8 UConn	W 72–69	16–6 (10–3)	XL Center (8,473); Hartford, CT
February 11, 2022; 7:00 pm, BEDN		Marquette	W 74–63 ^{OT}	17–6 (11–3)	Finneran Pavilion (1,405); Villanova, PA
February 13, 2022; 1:00 pm		at Seton Hall	L 60–72	17–7 (11–4)	Walsh Gymnasium (1,051); South Orange, NJ
February 20, 2022; 2:00 pm		DePaul	W 73–64	18–7 (12–4)	Finneran Pavilion (2,771); Villanova, PA
February 22, 2022; 7:00 pm		at Georgetown; Rescheduled from Jan. 9	W 73–61	19–7 (13–4)	McDonough Arena (329); Washington, D.C.
February 25, 2022; 12:00 pm		at Butler	W 72–36	20–7 (14–4)	Hinkle Fieldhouse (519); Indianapolis, IN
February 27, 2022; 2:00 pm		at Xavier	W 58–49	21–7 (15–4)	Cintas Center (435); Cincinnati, OH
Big East Women's Tournament
March 5, 2022; 7:00 pm, FS2	(2)	vs. (7) St. John's; Quarterfinals	W 76–52	22–7	Mohegan Sun Arena; Uncasville, CT
March 6, 2022; 5:30 pm, FS1	(2)	vs. (6) Seton Hall; Semifinals	W 64–55	23–7	Mohegan Sun Arena; Uncasville, CT
March 7, 2022; 8:00 pm, FS1	(2)	vs. (1) No. 6 UConn; Championship	L 40–70	23–8	Mohegan Sun Arena (6,459); Uncasville, CT
NCAA Women's Tournament
March 19, 2022*; 1:00 pm, ESPNews	(11 W)	vs. (6 W) No. 20 BYU; First Round	W 61–57	24–8	Crisler Center; Ann Arbor, MI
March 21, 2022*; 6:00 pm, ESPNU	(11 W)	at (3 W) No. 12 Michigan; Second Round	L 49–64	24–9	Crisler Center; Ann Arbor, MI
*Non-conference game. ^{#}Rankings from AP Poll. (#) Tournament seedings in parentheses. W=Wichita. All times are in Eastern Time.

== Rankings ==
Regular season polls
Poll	Pre- Season	Week 2	Week 3	Week 4	Week 5	Week 6	Week 7	Week 8	Week 9	Week 10	Week 11	Week 12	Week 13	Week 14	Week 15	Week 16	Week 17	Week 18	Week 19	Final
AP															RV	RV	RV	RV	RV	
Coaches																				

Legend
	Increase in ranking
	Decrease in ranking
	Not ranked previous week
(RV)	Received Votes

== See also ==
- 2021–22 Villanova Wildcats men's basketball team
