= Christyn Williams =

American basketball player (born 2000)

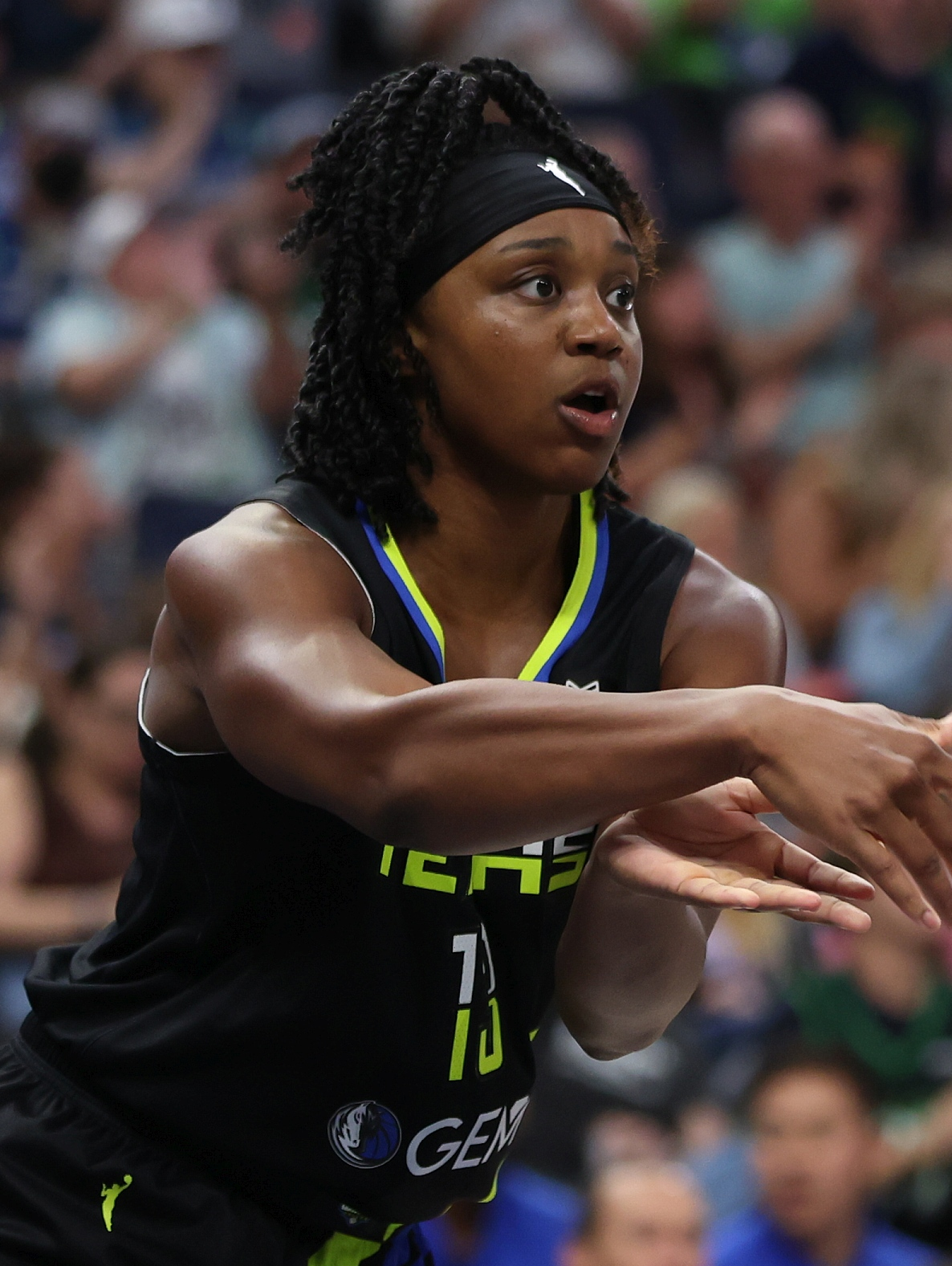
- Williams in 2025

No. 31 – Dallas Wings
- Position: Shooting guard
- League: WNBA

Personal information
- Born: May 20, 2000 (age 26) Little Rock, Arkansas, U.S.
- Listed height: 5 ft 11 in (1.80 m)
- Listed weight: 174 lb (79 kg)

Career information
- High school: Central Arkansas Christian (North Little Rock, Arkansas)
- College: UConn (2018–2022)
- WNBA draft: 2022: 2nd round, 14th overall pick
- Drafted by: Washington Mystics

Career history
- 2025: Dallas Wings
- 2025–2026: Hapoel Rishon Lezion
- 2026: Greensboro Groove
- 2026-present: Dallas Wings

Career highlights
- Ann Meyers Drysdale Award (2022); Big East tournament MOP (2022); 2× First-team All-Big East (2021, 2022); First-team All-AAC (2020); AAC Freshman of the Year (2019); AAC All-Freshman team (2019); WBCA National Player of the Year award (2018); Gatorade National Player of the Year (2018); Morgan Wootten National Player of the Year (2018); Naismith Prep Player of the Year (2018); USA Today Player of the Year (2018); McDonald's All-American Game MVP (2018); MaxPreps National Player of the Year (2018)
- Stats at Basketball Reference
Medals
Women's basketball
Representing United States
FIBA Under-18 Americas Championship
Gold medal – first place	2018 Mexico	Team
FIBA Under-19 World Cup
Silver medal – second place	2017 Italy	Team
FIBA Under-17 World Cup
Bronze medal – third place	2016 Spain	Team
Women's 3x3 basketball
Representing the United States
Pan American Games
Gold medal – first place	2019 Lima	National 3x3 team
FIBA 3x3 Under-18 World Cup
Gold medal – first place	2017 China	Team

Christyn Williams (born May 20, 2000) is an American women's basketball player who currently plays for the Dallas Wings of the WNBA. She was drafted by the Washington Mystics. She played college basketball at the University of Connecticut (UConn). She played in high school for Central Arkansas Christian School in North Little Rock, Arkansas. A five-star recruit and one of the most decorated high school basketball players in history, Williams rose to national acclaim after winning the 2018 WBCA National Player of the Year award, the 2018 Naismith National Player of the Year award the 2018 Gatorade National Player of the Year award, and the 2018 USA Today Player of the Year award. Williams also was named a McDonald's All-American, where she was named the game's MVP after scoring 22 points and leading the West team to an 82–79 victory. Williams was awarded the Morgan Wootten Award, which is given each year to "the McDonald's All American who best exhibits outstanding character, leadership and the values of a student-athlete in the classroom and the community". Williams was also named to the 2018 Jordan Brand Classic team.

== High school career ==
As a freshman in the 2014–15 season, Williams averaged 18.5 points a game for the Lady Mustangs while helping lead the team to a 28–4 record and an appearance in the state quarterfinals. The next season as a sophomore Williams carried a heavy load for the team, averaging a career-best 28.5 points per game and leading the team to a runner-up finish in the Arkansas 4A state tournament. In 2016–17, Williams' junior season, she averaged 26.0 points per game and led the team to a 29–5 record. The Lady Mustangs finished the season with a loss in the state quarterfinals. As a senior in 2017–18, Williams and the Lady Mustangs had the best season in school history, finishing with a 36–1 record and winning the 2–4A Conference, 2–4A District, 4A East Region, and 4A State Championships while averaging 26.8 points and 10.4 rebounds per game. Finishing with 3500 points, Williams ended her career with the second-most points in Arkansas girls basketball history, behind only Lakyn Garrison of Wickes, who played from 2003 to 2007. Over the course of her career, she led the Lady Mustangs to a 117–24 record, including the Arkansas 4A 2018 state championship.

== College career ==
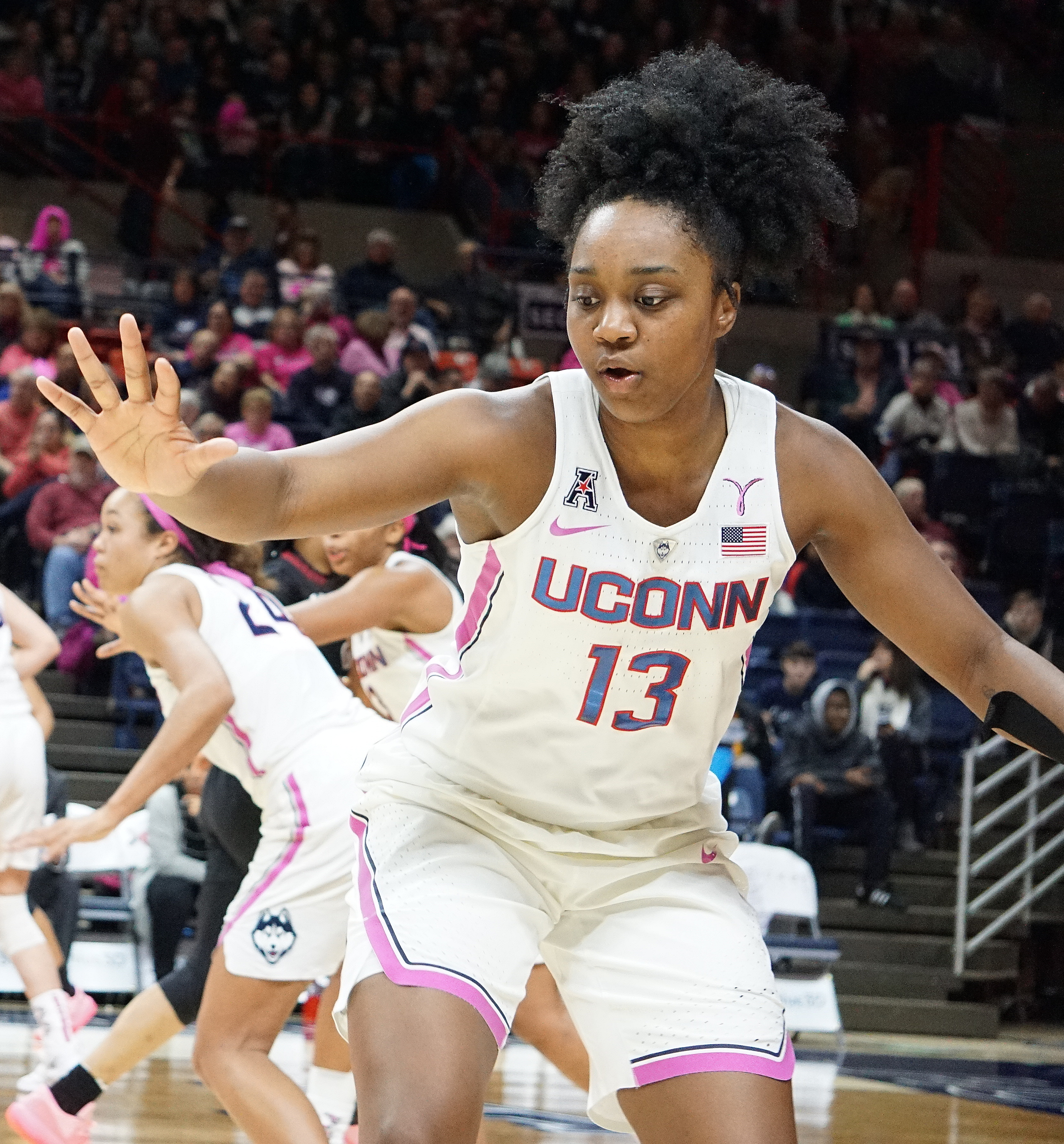
Williams in 2019

Williams made her debut for the University of Connecticut in the season opener against Ohio State on November 11, 2018. She started the game and ended with seven points, two rebounds, two assists, and three steals in the 85–53 win. Three weeks later Williams played a large part in the #2-ranked Huskies upsetting the #1-ranked Notre Dame Fighting Irish in South Bend, 89–71. Williams finished the game with a career-high 28 points. Williams started all 38 games during her freshman campaign and ended the season averaging 11.7 points, 3.2 rebounds, 2.3 assists, and 1.2 steals per game. The Huskies fell to Notre Dame in the 2019 Final Four, 81–76.

In her sophomore season, which was cut short by the 2019 COVID-19 pandemic, Williams started 31 of the Huskies' 32 games and averaged 14.6 points, 4.9 rebounds, 2.3 assists, and 1.3 steals per game for the 29–3 Huskies.

In October 2020, Williams was named the Big East Preseason Player of the Year before her junior season began.

In the 2020–21 season, Williams played a large role in the Huskies going 28–2, 18–0 during her junior season, with their only losses coming on the road at Arkansas, and in the Final Four vs Arizona. Williams finished the season averaging 16.3 points, 4.3 rebounds, 2.2 assists, and one steal per game.

In 2021–22, Williams’ senior season, UConn went 30–6, 16–1, and made it back to the national championship game for the first time since 2016, before coming up short against South Carolina in Minneapolis. She averaged 14.2 points, 3.4 rebounds, 2.3 assists, and 1.5 steals per game for the Huskies.

On April 1, 2022, Williams was presented with the Ann Meyers Drysdale Award, which annually recognizes the nation’s top shooting guard. Williams was the first Husky to win the honor.

On April 6, 2022, Williams announced that she would be entering the 2022 WNBA draft.

== WNBA career ==
On April 11, 2022, Williams was drafted by the Washington Mystics in the second round with the 14th overall pick. However, it was reported that Williams got hurt during practice and would have to undergo surgery for her knee injury. Thus, she was unable to play during the 2022 season.

On September 7, 2023 Williams signed a rest-of-the-season hardship contract with the Phoenix Mercury. Williams did not appear in either of the final two games of the season. On 11 May 2024, Williams was waived by the Phoenix Mercury.

On February 26, 2025, Williams signed a training camp contract with the Minnesota Lynx.

On August 29, 2025, the Dallas Wings signed Williams to an “extreme hardship contract.” She made her debut on that same day, against the Atlanta Dream, and played in a total of 4 games in the season, averaging 4.3 points, 1.0 rebounds, and 0.8 assists per game.

On May 11, 2026, it was announced that Williams had join the Greensboro Groove of the UpShot League for their inaugural season.

On August 14, 2026, she was again signed by the Dallas Wings, this time to a Player Development Contract.

== Career statistics ==
Legend
GP	Games played	GS	Games started	MPG	Minutes per game	RPG	Rebounds per game
APG	Assists per game	SPG	Steals per game	BPG	Blocks per game	PPG	Points per game
TO	Turnovers per game	FG%	Field-goal percentage	3P%	3-point field-goal percentage	FT%	Free-throw percentage
**Bold**	Career best	°	League leader

=== WNBA ===
==== Regular season ====
Stats current through end of 2025 season

WNBA regular season statistics
Year	Team	GP	GS	MPG	FG%	3P%	FT%	RPG	APG	SPG	BPG	TO	PPG
2025	Dallas	4	0	11.3	.375	.250	.667	1.0	0.8	0.0	0.0	0.3	4.3
**Career**	1 year, 1 team	4	0	11.3	.375	.250	.667	1.0	0.8	0.0	0.0	0.3	4.3

=== College ===
Year	Team	GP	GS	MPG	FG%	3P%	FT%	RPG	APG	SPG	BPG	TO	PPG
2018–19	UConn	**38**	**38**	32.1	**49.9**	**36.7**	74.0	3.2	2.3	1.2	0.2	**1.4**	11.7
2019–20	UConn	32	31	**35.6**	45.7	33.3	**74.4**	**4.9**	2.3	1.3	0.2	1.7	14.6
2020–21	UConn	29	29	34.4	47.9	34.3	69.0	4.3	2.2	0.9	**0.5**	1.8	**16.3**
2021–22	UConn	33	33	33.8	45.4	33.8	68.5	3.4	2.3	**1.5**	0.4	1.7	14.2
**Career**		132	131	33.9	47.1	34.5	71.6	3.9	2.3	1.2	0.3	1.6	14.0
Statistics retrieved from Sports-Reference.
