= 2022 NCAA Women's Basketball All-Americans =

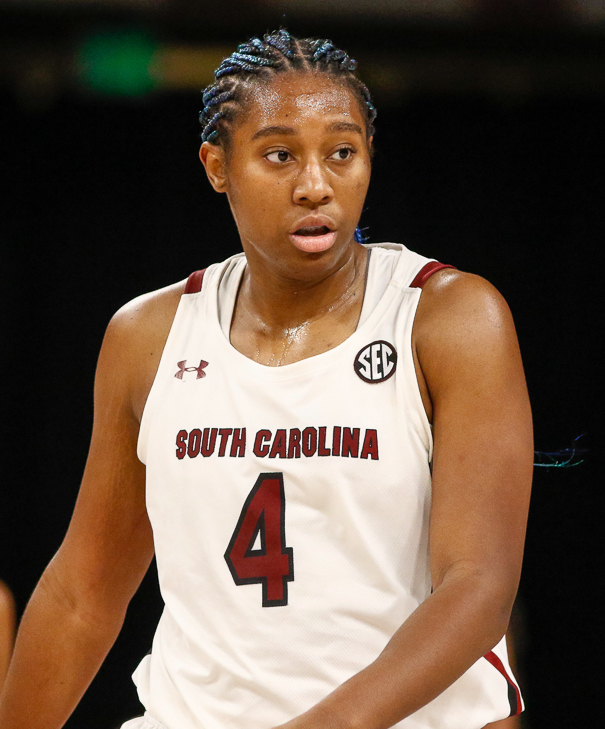
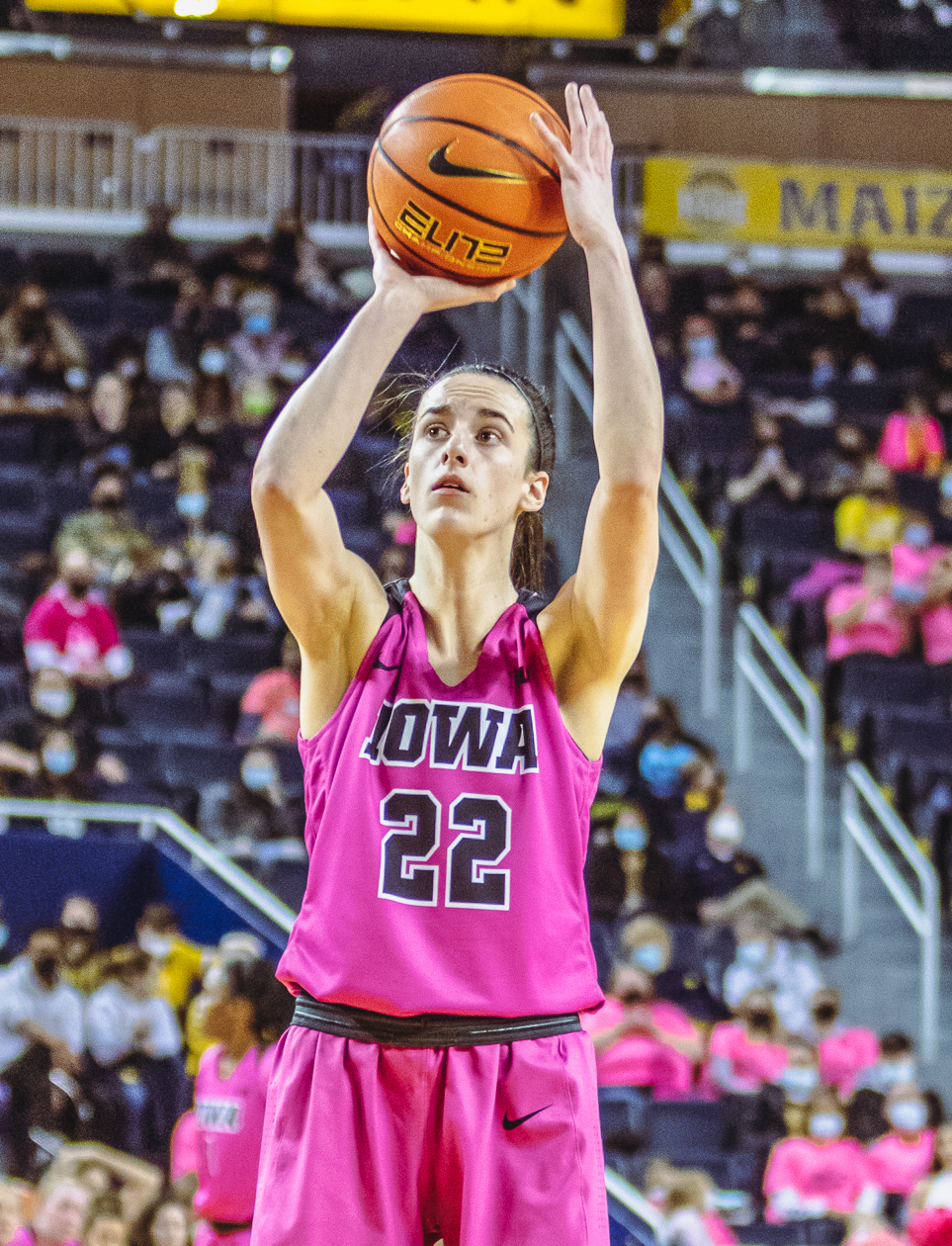
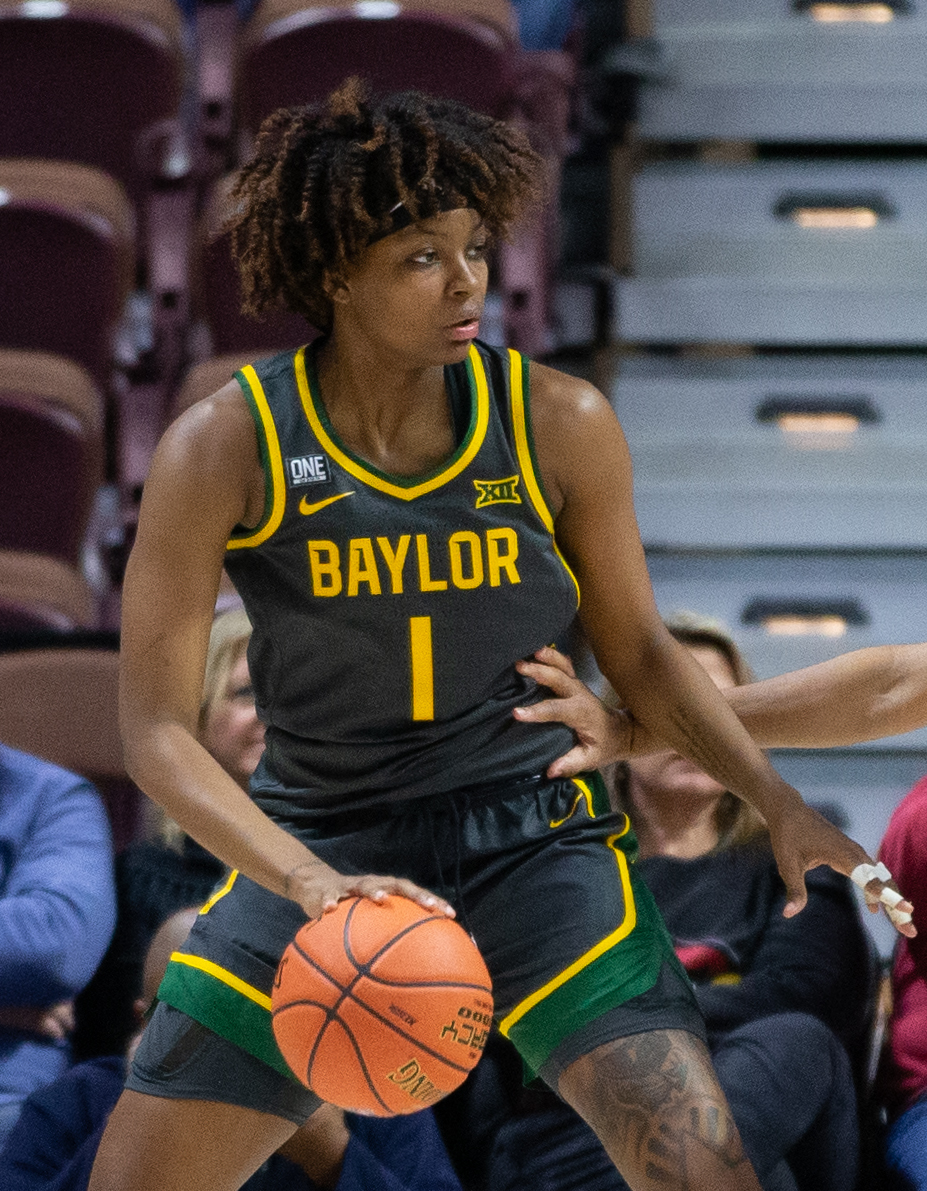
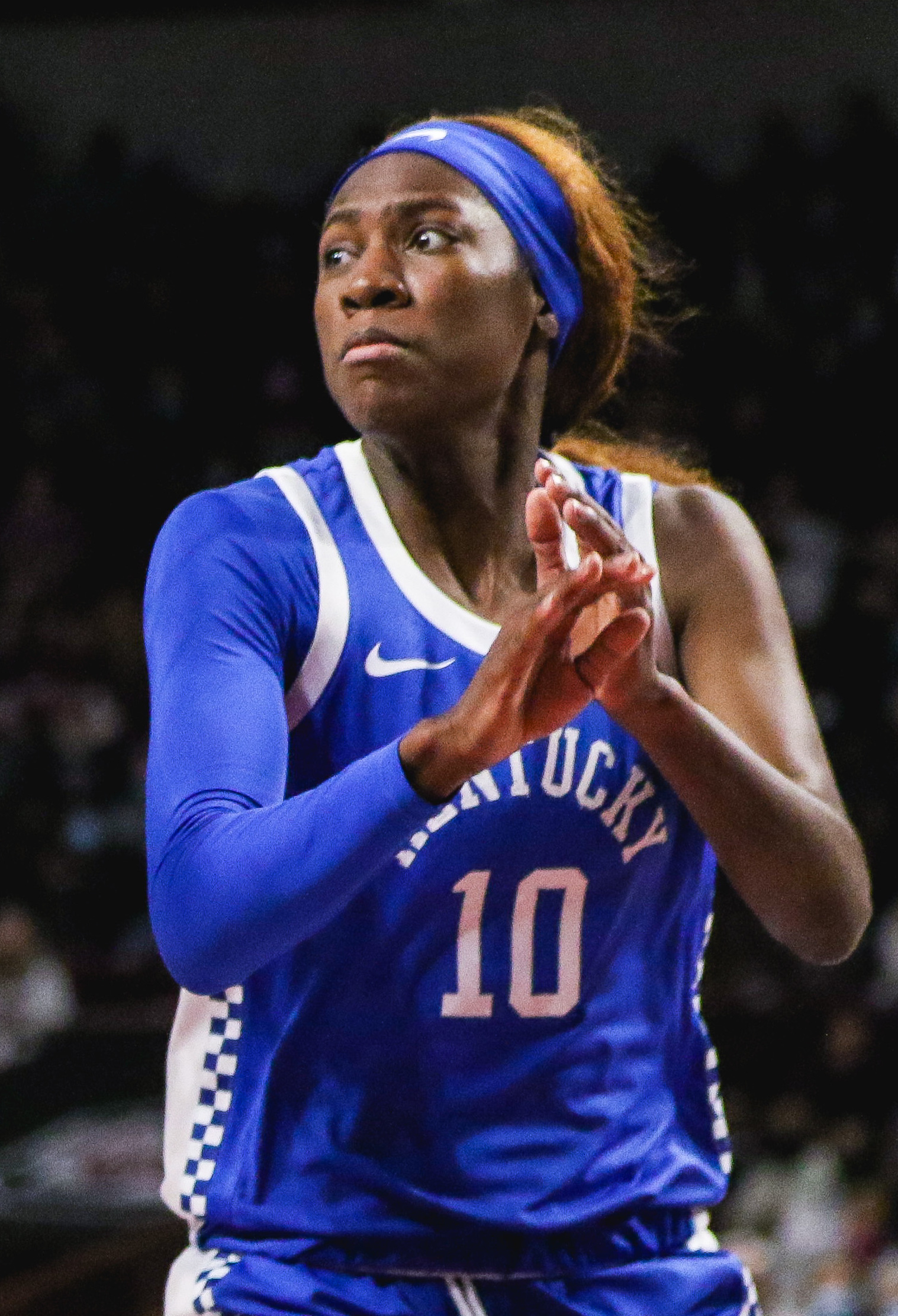
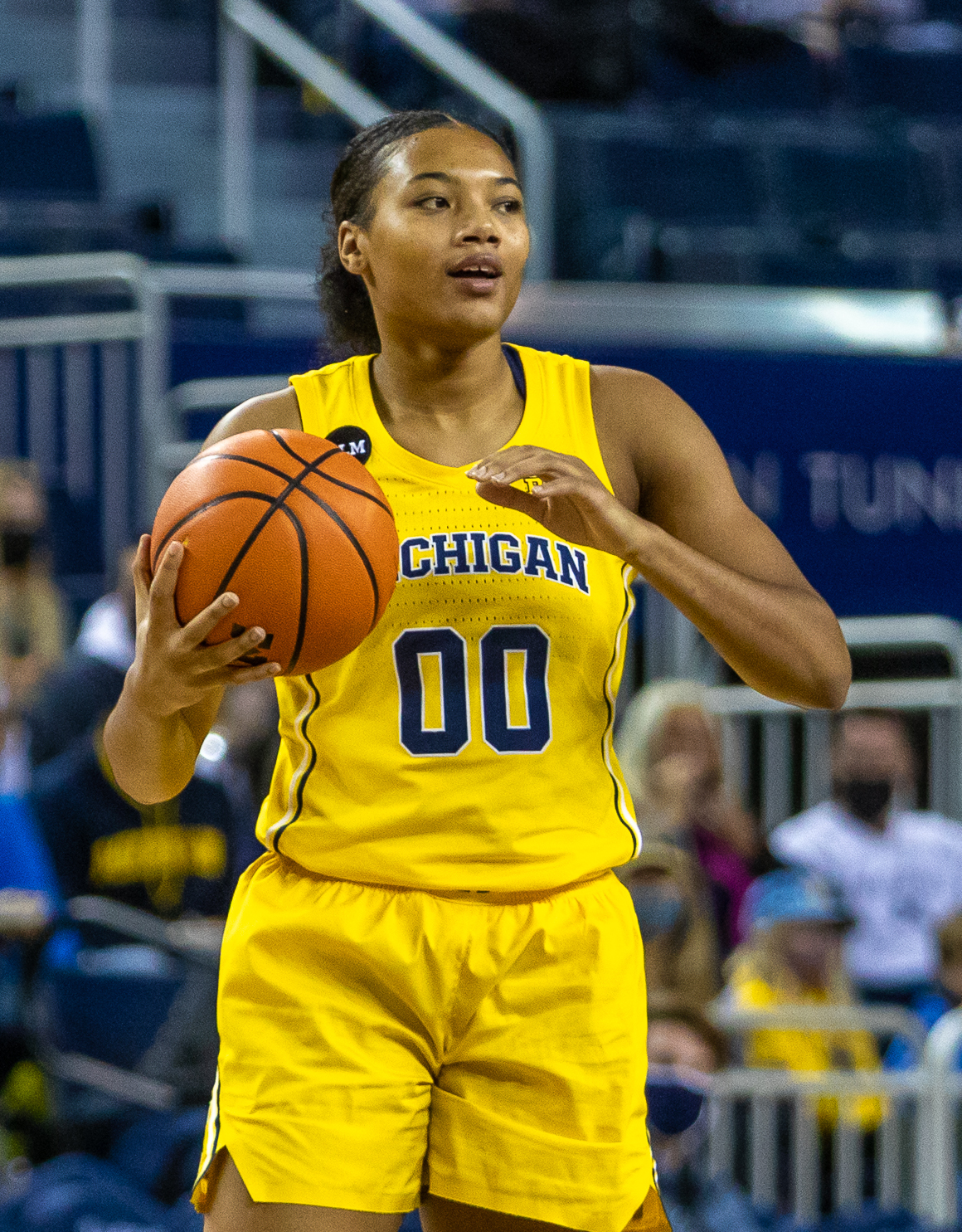
- Members of the 2022 All-America first team (AP, USBWA). Clockwise from upper left: Boston, Clark, Hillmon, Howard, and Smith.
- Awarded for: 2021–22 NCAA Division I women's basketball season

An All-American team is an honorary sports team composed of the best amateur players of a specific season for each team position—who in turn are given the honorific "All-America" and typically referred to as "All-American athletes", or simply "All-Americans". Although the honorees generally do not compete together as a unit, the term is used in U.S. team sports to refer to players who are selected by members of the national media. Walter Camp selected the first All-America team in the early days of American football in 1889. The 2022 NCAA Women's Basketball All-Americans are honorary lists that include All-American selections from the Associated Press (AP), the United States Basketball Writers Association (USBWA), and the Women's Basketball Coaches Association (WBCA) for the 2021–22 NCAA Division I women's basketball season. Both AP and USBWA choose three teams, while WBCA lists 10 honorees.

A consensus All-America team in women's basketball has never been organized. This differs from the practice in men's basketball, in which the NCAA uses a combination of selections by AP, USBWA, the National Association of Basketball Coaches (NABC), and Sporting News to determine a consensus All-America team. The selection of a consensus All-America men's basketball team is possible because all four organizations select at least a first and second team, with only the USBWA not selecting a third team.

Before the 2017–18 season, it was impossible for a consensus women's All-America team to be determined because the AP had been the only body that divided its women's selections into separate teams. The USBWA first named separate teams in 2017–18. The women's counterpart to the NABC, the Women's Basketball Coaches Association (WBCA), continues the USBWA's former practice of selecting a single 10-member (plus ties) team. Before the 2023–24 season, Sporting News did not select an All-America team in women's basketball.

== By selector ==
=== Associated Press (AP) ===
Announced on March 16, 2022; listed in order of votes received. Of note:

- Rhyne Howard became the ninth player to be selected as a three-time first-team All-American.
- Aliyah Boston, Caitlin Clark, and NaLyssa Smith were unanimous first-team selections.
- Naz Hillmon and Haley Jones tied for the fifth spot, resulting in a six-member first team. This was the first such tie since the AP started selecting women's All-Americans in 1995.

First team		Second team		Third team	
Player	School	Player	School	Player	School
Aliyah Boston	South Carolina	Ayoka Lee	Kansas State	Elizabeth Kitley	Virginia Tech
Caitlin Clark	Iowa	Ashley Joens	Iowa State	Maddy Siegrist	Villanova
NaLyssa Smith	Baylor	Aneesah Morrow	DePaul	Veronica Burton	Northwestern
Rhyne Howard	Kentucky	Khayla Pointer	LSU	Cameron Brink	Stanford
Naz Hillmon	Michigan	Elissa Cunane	NC State	Angel Reese	LSU
Haley Jones	Stanford				

==== AP Honorable Mention ====
- Shakira Austin, Ole Miss
- Kierstan Bell, Florida Gulf Coast
- Katie Benzan, Maryland
- Grace Berger, Indiana
- Paige Bueckers, UConn
- Nia Clouden, Michigan State
- Jennifer Coleman, Navy
- Zia Cooke, South Carolina
- Monika Czinano, Iowa

- Jasmine Dickey, Delaware
- Emily Engstler, Louisville
- Dyaisha Fair, Buffalo
- Shaylee Gonzales, BYU
- Destanni Henderson, South Carolina
- Rori Harmon, Texas
- Jordan Horston, Tennessee
- Abby Meyers, Princeton

- Olivia Miles, Notre Dame
- Ashley Owusu, Maryland
- Cate Reese, Arizona
- Taylor Robertson, Oklahoma
- Jacy Sheldon, Ohio State
- Christyn Williams, UConn
- Macee Williams, IUPUI
- Katelyn Young, Murray State

=== United States Basketball Writers Association (USBWA) ===
The USBWA announced its 15-member team, divided into first, second, and third teams, plus honorable mention selections, on March 17, 2022. Vote totals were not released.

First team		Second team		Third team	
Player	School	Player	School	Player	School
Aliyah Boston	South Carolina	Elissa Cunane	NC State	Cameron Brink	Stanford
Caitlin Clark	Iowa	Ashley Joens	Iowa State	Destanni Henderson	South Carolina
Naz Hillmon	Michigan	Haley Jones	Stanford	Elizabeth Kitley	Virginia Tech
Rhyne Howard	Kentucky	Ayoka Lee	Kansas State	Khayla Pointer	LSU
NaLyssa Smith	Baylor	Aneesah Morrow	DePaul	Maddy Siegrist	Villanova

==== USBWA Honorable Mention ====
- Shakira Austin, Ole Miss
- Kierstan Bell, Florida Gulf Coast

- Grace Berger, Indiana
- Veronica Burton, Northwestern

- Angel Reese, Maryland
- Christyn Williams, UConn

=== Women's Basketball Coaches Association (WBCA) ===
The WBCA announced its All-America team on March 31, 2022, with Aliyah Boston announced as the Wade Trophy recipient.

Player	School
Aliyah Boston	South Carolina
Cameron Brink	Stanford
Caitlin Clark	Iowa
Elissa Cunane	NC State
Naz Hillmon	Michigan
Rhyne Howard	Kentucky
Ashley Joens	Iowa State
Haley Jones	Stanford
Elizabeth Kitley	Virginia Tech
NaLyssa Smith	Baylor

== Academic All-Americans ==
The College Sports Information Directors of America (CoSIDA; renamed in September 2022 as College Sports Communicators) announced its 2022 Academic All-America team on March 16, 2022, divided into first, second and third teams, with Aliyah Boston of South Carolina chosen as women's college basketball Academic All-American of the Year for the second straight season. Due to a tie for the fifth spot on the second team, the overall team had 16 members instead of the usual 15.

First Team
Player	School	Class	GPA and major
Aliyah Boston (Note: Academic All-American of the Year in 2020–21.)	South Carolina	Jr.	3.74, Mass Communications
Caitlin Clark	Iowa	So.	3.53, Pre-Business
Lexie Hull (Note: First team in 2020–21.)	Stanford	Sr.	3.90, Management Science & Engineering (UG & G)
Ayoka Lee (Note: Second team in 2020–21.)	Kansas State	GS	3.89/4.00, Couple & Family Therapy (G)
Sam Thomas	Arizona	GS	4.00/4.00, Educational Leadership (G)

Second Team
Player	School	Class	GPA and major
Conley Chinn (Note: Third team in 2020–21.)	Belmont	Sr.	4.00, Psychology
Vivian Gray (Note: Third team in 2019–20 and first team in 2020–21.)	Texas Tech	GS	3.77/3.75, MBA (G)
Caitlyn Harper	California Baptist	Sr.	4.00, Accounting
Lacie Hull	Stanford	Sr.	3.89, Product Design (UG) / Management Science & Engineering (G)
Dariauna Lewis	Alabama A&M	Sr.	3.84, Biology
Myah Selland	South Dakota State	Sr.	3.97, Exercise Science / Community & Public Health

Third Team
Player	School	Class	GPA and major
Sam Breen	UMass	GS	3.74/3.90, Learning, Media, & Technology (G)
Veronica Burton	Northwestern	Sr.	3.78, Learning & Organizational Change
Mary Crompton	Illinois State	GS	4.00/4.00, Biology (UG & G)
Makenna Marisa	Penn State	Jr.	3.75, Education
Erin Whalen	Dayton	GS	3.87/3.88, Communication (G)

== Senior All-Americans ==
The 10 finalists for the Senior CLASS Award, called Senior All-Americans, were announced on February 10, 2022. Lexie Hull of Stanford was announced as the recipient on March 31, with the first and second teams also announced at that time.

=== First team ===
Player	Position	School
Lexie Hull	Guard	Stanford
Rhyne Howard	Guard	Kentucky
Ali Patberg	Guard	Indiana
Sam Thomas	Forward	Arizona
Macee Williams	Forward-center	IUPUI

=== Second team ===
Player	Position	School
Elissa Cunane	Center	NC State
Naz Hillmon	Forward	Michigan
Morgan Jones	Guard	Florida State
Sonya Morris	Guard	DePaul
NaLyssa Smith	Forward	Baylor
