= 2021–22 Ohio State Buckeyes women's basketball team =

Intercollegiate basketball season

2021–22 Ohio State Buckeyes women's basketball

Big Ten regular season co-champions

NCAA tournament, Sweet Sixteen
- Conference: Big Ten Conference

Ranking
- Coaches: No. 13
- AP: No. 14
- Record: 25–7 (14–4 Big Ten)
- Head coach: Kevin McGuff (9th season)
- Associate head coach: Carla Morrow
- Assistant coaches: Wesley Brooks; Jalen Powell
- Home arena: Value City Arena

2021–22 Big Ten women's basketball standings
	Conf.				Overall
Team	W		L	PCT	W		L	PCT
No. 14 Ohio State	14	–	4	.778	25	–	7	.781
No. 8 Iowa †	14	–	4	.778	24	–	8	.750
No. 12 Michigan	13	–	4	.765	25	–	7	.781
No. 13 Maryland	13	–	4	.765	23	–	9	.719
No. 11 Indiana	11	–	5	.688	24	–	9	.727
Nebraska	11	–	7	.611	24	–	9	.727
Northwestern	8	–	8	.500	17	–	12	.586
Michigan State	8	–	9	.471	15	–	15	.500
Purdue	7	–	11	.389	17	–	15	.531
Minnesota	7	–	11	.389	15	–	18	.455
Penn State	5	–	13	.278	11	–	18	.379
Wisconsin	5	–	13	.278	8	–	21	.276
Rutgers	3	–	14	.176	11	–	20	.355
Illinois	1	–	13	.071	7	–	20	.259
† 2022 Big Ten tournament winner Rankings from AP poll

The 2021–22 Ohio State Buckeyes women's basketball team represented the Ohio State University during the 2021–22 NCAA Division I women's basketball season. The Buckeyes, led by ninth-year head coach Kevin McGuff, played their home games at Value City Arena. They were members of the Big Ten Conference.

They finished the season 25–7 overall and 14–4 in Big Ten play to finish in a tie for first place. As the first seed in the Big Ten tournament, they defeated eighth seed Michigan State in the quarterfinals before losing to fifth seed Indiana in the semifinals. They received an at-large bid to the NCAA tournament as the sixth seed in the Spokane Region. They defeated eleventh seed Missouri State in the first round and third seed LSU in the second round before losing to second seed Texas in the Sweet Sixteen to end their season.

== Previous season ==
The Buckeyes finished the season 13–7, 9–7 in Big Ten play to finish in seventh place. They did not participate in the Big Ten women's basketball tournament, NCAA tournament or the WNIT, due to a self-imposed postseason ban.

== Roster ==
2021–22 Ohio State Buckeyes women's basketball team
Players
Coaches

Pos.	#	Name	Height	Year	Previous school	Hometown
G	0	Madison Greene	5 ft 8 in (1.73 m)	Jr	Pickerington Central	Pickerington, OH
G	1	Rikki Harris	5 ft 10 in (1.78 m)	RS So	North Central	Indianapolis, IN
F	2	Gabby Hutcherson	6 ft 2 in (1.88 m)	So	Westerville South	Westerville, OH
G	3	Anyssa Jones	5 ft 10 in (1.78 m)	So	Westerville South	Westerville, OH
G	4	Jacy Sheldon	5 ft 10 in (1.78 m)	Jr	Dublin Coffman	Dublin, OH
G	5	Kateri Poole	5 ft 8 in (1.73 m)	So	South Shore	Bronx, NY
G	10	Braxtin Miller	5 ft 11 in (1.8 m)	Sr	Alter; Oklahoma State	Dayton, OH
G/F	14	Taylor Thierry	5 ft 11 in (1.8 m)	Fr	Shaker Heights Laurel	Cleveland, OH
G	20	Kaitlyn Costner	5 ft 8 in (1.73 m)	Fr	Elkhart Central	Osceola, IN
G	21	Hevynne Bristow	6 ft 1 in (1.85 m)	Jr	Brooklyn Community; Providence	Brooklyn, NY
F	23	Rebeka Mikulášiková	6 ft 4 in (1.93 m)	Jr	Piaristické Gymnasium	Nitra, Slovakia
G	24	Taylor Mikesell	5 ft 11 in (1.8 m)	Sr	Jackson; Oregon	Massillon, OH
F	35	Tanaya Beacham	6 ft 1 in (1.85 m)	GS	Toledo Rogers; Toledo	Youngstown, OH

Head coach

- Kevin McGuff (Saint Joseph's (IN))

Assistant coach(es)

- Carla Morrow (Tulsa)
- Wesley Brooks (West Virginia)
- Jalen Powell (Mississippi)

Legend

- (C) Team captain
- (S) Suspended
- (I) Ineligible
- (W) Walk-on
- Injured
- Current redshirt

Roster
Last update: March 31, 2022

== Schedule and results ==
Date time, TV	Rank^{#}	Opponent^{#}	Result	Record	Site (attendance) city, state
Exhibition
November 3, 2021*	No. 17т	Slippery Rock	W 96–48	–	Value City Arena (2,425); Columbus, OH
Regular season
November 10, 2021*; 7:00 p.m.	No. 17т	Bucknell	W 71–48	1–0	Value City Arena (2,748); Columbus, OH
November 14, 2021*; 2:00 p.m.	No. 17т	Norfolk State	W 86–48	2–0	Value City Arena (2,980); Columbus, OH
November 17, 2021*; 7:00 p.m.	No. 21	Bowling Green	W 94–63	3–0	Value City Arena (3,418); Columbus, OH
November 23, 2021*; 7:00 p.m.	No. 21	Bellarmine	W 110–58	4–0	Value City Arena (2,766); Columbus, OH
November 27, 2021*; 6:00 p.m.	No. 21	Cincinnati	W 86–50	5–0	Covelli Center (2,315); Columbus, OH
December 1, 2021*; 7:00 p.m., ACCN	No. 18т	at Syracuse; ACC–Big Ten Women's Challenge	L 91–97	5–1	Carrier Dome (847); Syracuse, NY
December 5, 2021; 2:00 p.m.	No. 18т	at Purdue	W 70–53	6–1 (1–0)	Mackey Arena (3,236); West Lafayette, IN
December 7, 2021*; 7:00 p.m.	No. 20	Mount St. Mary's	W 94–50	7–1	Value City Arena (2,805); Columbus, OH
December 12, 2021; 7:00 p.m., BTN	No. 20	No. 10 Indiana	L 66–86	7–2 (1–1)	Value City Arena (3,606); Columbus, OH
December 15, 2021*; 7:00 p.m.	No. 24	Alabama State	W 97–51	8–2	Value City Arena (2,832); Columbus, OH
December 19, 2021*; 5:00 p.m., P12N	No. 24	at UCLA	Canceled		Pauley Pavilion; Los Angeles, CA
December 21, 2021*; 1:00 p.m.	No. 24	at San Diego State	W 66–54	9–2	Viejas Arena (562); San Diego, CA
December 31, 2021; Noon, BTN	No. 25	at No. 9 Michigan; Rivalry	L 71–90	9–3 (1–2)	Crisler Center (7,904); Ann Arbor, MI
January 6, 2022; 7:00 p.m., BTN+		Illinois	W 90–69	10–3 (2–2)	Value City Arena (2,567); Columbus, OH
January 9, 2022; 2:00 p.m., BTN+		at Northwestern	W 74–61	11–3 (3–2)	Welsh–Ryan Arena (1,232); Evanston, IL
January 12, 2022; 7:00 p.m., BTN+		Michigan State	W 89–83	12–3 (4–2)	Value City Arena (2,917); Columbus, OH
January 15, 2022; 5:00 p.m., BTN+		at Minnesota	W 83–75	13–3 (5–2)	Williams Arena (3,177); Minneapolis, MN
January 20, 2022; 6:00 p.m., BTN		No. 12 Maryland	W 95–89	14–3 (6–2)	Value City Arena (3,319); Columbus, OH
January 23, 2022; 1:00 p.m., ESPN2		at Rutgers	W 80–71	15–3 (7–2)	Jersey Mike's Arena (1,219); Piscataway, NJ
January 27, 2022; 7:00 p.m., BTN+	No. 22	No. 7 Michigan; Rivalry	L 58–77	15–4 (7–3)	Value City Arena (4,293); Columbus, OH
January 31, 2022; 8:00 p.m., BTN	No. 23	at No. 21 Iowa	W 92–88	16–4 (8–3)	Carver–Hawkeye Arena (6,185); Iowa City, IA
February 7, 2022; 6:00 p.m., BTN	No. 21	Rutgers	W 61–57	17–4 (9–3)	Value City Arena (3,383); Columbus, OH
February 10, 2022; 7:00 p.m., FS1	No. 21	Nebraska	W 80–70	18–4 (10–3)	Value City Arena (3,135); Columbus, OH
February 14, 2022; 8:00 p.m., BTN	No. 18	at Illinois	W 86–67	19–4 (11–3)	State Farm Center (997); Champaign, IL
February 17, 2022; 8:00 p.m., BTN	No. 18	at No. 13 Maryland	L 72–77	19–5 (11–4)	Xfinity Center (4,987); College Park, MD
February 20, 2022; 2:00 p.m., BTN+	No. 18	Wisconsin	W 59–42	20–5 (12–4)	Value City Arena (5,683); Columbus, OH
February 24, 2022; 6:00 p.m., BTN+	No. 17	Penn State; Rescheduled from 1/3	W 78–55	21–5 (13–4)	Value City Arena (3,618); Columbus, OH
February 27, 2022; 2:30 p.m., BTN	No. 17	at Michigan State	W 61–55	22–5 (14–4)	Breslin Center (7,124); East Lansing, MI
Big Ten Women's Tournament
March 4, 2022; 11:30 a.m., BTN	(1) No. 13	vs. (8) Michigan State; Quarterfinals	W 74–58	23–5	Gainbridge Fieldhouse (0); Indianapolis, IN
March 5, 2022; 3:30 p.m., BTN	(1) No. 13	vs. (5) No. 14т Indiana; Semifinals	L 62–70	23–6	Gainbridge Fieldhouse (7,749); Indianapolis, IN
NCAA tournament
March 19, 2022*; 2:30 p.m., ESPN2	(6 S) No. 14	vs. (11 S) Missouri State; First Round	W 63–56	24–6	Maravich Center (0); Baton Rouge, LA
March 21, 2022; 8:00 p.m., ESPN2	(6 S) No. 14	vs. (3 S) No. 9 LSU; Second Round	W 79–64	25–6	Maravich Center (8,135); Baton Rouge, LA
March 25, 2022*; 7:00 p.m., ESPN2	(6 S) No. 14	vs. (2 S) No. 6 Texas; Sweet Sixteen	L 63–66	25–7	Spokane Arena (0); Spokane, WA
*Non-conference game. ^{#}Rankings from AP Poll. (#) Tournament seedings in parentheses. S=Spokane. All times are in Eastern Time.

== Rankings ==
Ranking movements Legend: ██ Increase in ranking ██ Decrease in ranking RV = Received votes т = Tied with team above or below
	Week																		
Poll	Pre	1	2	3	4	5	6	7	8	9	10	11	12	13	14	15	16	17	Final
AP	17т	21	21	18т	20	24	24	25	RV	RV	RV	22	23	21	18	17	13	14	14
Coaches	25	24	20	21	24	24	25	RV	RV	25	19	21	21	19	17	16	15	15	13

Legend
	Increase in ranking
	Decrease in ranking
	Not ranked previous week
(RV)	Received votes
(NR)	Not ranked and did not receive votes

Coaches did not release a Week 2 poll, and AP does not release a final poll.
