= 2021–22 Wisconsin Badgers women's basketball team =

Intercollegiate basketball season

2021–22 Wisconsin Badgers women's basketball
- Conference: Big Ten Conference
- Record: 8–21 (5–13 Big Ten)
- Head coach: Marisa Moseley (1st season)
- Assistant coaches: Scott Merritt; Kate Barnosky; Caroline Doty
- Home arena: Kohl Center

2021–22 Big Ten women's basketball standings
	Conf.				Overall
Team	W		L	PCT	W		L	PCT
No. 14 Ohio State	14	–	4	.778	25	–	7	.781
No. 8 Iowa †	14	–	4	.778	24	–	8	.750
No. 12 Michigan	13	–	4	.765	25	–	7	.781
No. 13 Maryland	13	–	4	.765	23	–	9	.719
No. 11 Indiana	11	–	5	.688	24	–	9	.727
Nebraska	11	–	7	.611	24	–	9	.727
Northwestern	8	–	8	.500	17	–	12	.586
Michigan State	8	–	9	.471	15	–	15	.500
Purdue	7	–	11	.389	17	–	15	.531
Minnesota	7	–	11	.389	15	–	18	.455
Penn State	5	–	13	.278	11	–	18	.379
Wisconsin	5	–	13	.278	8	–	21	.276
Rutgers	3	–	14	.176	11	–	20	.355
Illinois	1	–	13	.071	7	–	20	.259
† 2022 Big Ten tournament winner Rankings from AP poll

The 2021–22 Wisconsin Badgers women's basketball team represented the University of Wisconsin–Madison during the 2021–22 NCAA Division I women's basketball season. The Badgers are led by first-year head coach Marisa Moseley and play their home games at the Kohl Center as members of the Big Ten Conference. They will compete in the 2021–22 Big Ten Conference season and the 2022 Big Ten women's basketball tournament.

== Previous season ==
The Badgers finished the 2020–21 season 5–19, including 2–18 in Big Ten play, to finish in last place. They lost in the first round of the Big Ten women's tournament to Illinois. After the loss, they fired Jonathan Tsipis. On March 26, 2021, Marisa Moseley was named the 8th coach in the history of the Badgers.

After the season, the team lost one player to graduation and two players to transfers, while adding one player as a transfer.

== Roster ==
2021–22 Wisconsin Badgers women's basketball team
Players
Coaches

Pos.	#	Name	Height	Year	Previous school	Hometown
G	2	Katie Nelson	5 ft 8 in (1.73 m)	GS	Boston University	Falmouth, MA
G	3	Brooke Schramek	6 ft 0 in (1.83 m)	So	Benet Academy	Naperville, IL
F	5	Julie Pospisilova	6 ft 1 in (1.85 m)	Jr	Downers Grove North	Prague, Czech Republic
G	10	Halle Douglass	6 ft 1 in (1.85 m)	So	Lake Forest	Lake Forest, IL
G	11	Maty Wilke	5 ft 10 in (1.78 m)	RS Fr	Beaver Dam	Beaver Dam, WI
G	14	Krystna Ellew	5 ft 10 in (1.78 m)	RS Fr	Taft	Chicago
F	20	Sacia Vanderpool	6 ft 4 in (1.93 m)	Fr	Byron	Byron, MN
F/C	22	Lovisa Djurström	6 ft 4 in (1.93 m)	Fr	Marks Gymnasieskola	Gothenburg, Sweden
G	23	Lexi Duckett	5 ft 11 in (1.8 m)	Jr	University of North Carolina, Chapel Hill	Daytona Beach
G	24	Natalie Leuzinger (W)	5 ft 8 in (1.73 m)	So	Black Hawk High School	Monroe, WI
G	30	Sydney Hilliard	6 ft 0 in (1.83 m)	Jr	Monroe	Monroe, WI
G	40	Tara Stauffacher	5 ft 11 in (1.8 m)	Jr	Beaver Dam	Beaver Dam, WI
C	41	Sara Stapleton	6 ft 3 in (1.91 m)	Jr	Centennial High School	Blaine, MN
F	44	Alex Leuhring	6 ft 2 in (1.88 m)	RS Sr	UW-Green Bay	Verona, WI

Head coach

- Marisa Moseley (Boston University)

Assistant coach(es)

- Scott Merritt (Marquette)
- Kate Barnosky (Tufts)
- Caroline Doty (Connecticut)

Legend

- (C) Team captain
- (S) Suspended
- (I) Ineligible
- (W) Walk-on
- Injured
- Current redshirt

Roster
Last update: September 18, 2021

== Recruiting class ==
College recruiting information
Name	Hometown	School	Height	Weight	Commit date
Maty Wilke; G	Beaver Dam, WI	Beaver Dam High School (Wisconsin)	5 ft 10 in (1.78 m)	N/A	
Maty Wilke; G	Recruit ratings: ESPN: (90)				
Krystyna Ellew; G	Chicago	Taft	5 ft 10 in (1.78 m)	N/A	
Krystyna Ellew; G	Recruit ratings: No ratings found				
Sacia Vanderpool; F	Byron, MN	Byron	6 ft 4 in (1.93 m)	N/A	
Sacia Vanderpool; F	Recruit ratings: No ratings found				
Overall recruit ranking:
Note: In many cases, Scout, Rivals, 247Sports, On3, and ESPN may conflict in their listings of height and weight.; In these cases, the average was taken. ESPN grades are on a 100-point scale.; Sources:

== Schedule and results ==
Date time, TV	Rank^{#}	Opponent^{#}	Result	Record	Site (attendance) city, state
Exhibition
Oct 31, 2021*; 2:00 pm, BTN+		Wisconsin–Oshkosh	W 81–47	–	Kohl Center; Madison, WI
Non-conference regular season
Nov 10, 2021*; 6:30 pm, ESPN+		St. Thomas - Minnesota	W 67–51	1–0	Kohl Center (2,270); Madison, WI
Nov 14, 2021*; 1:00 pm, ESPN+		NJIT	L 49–61	1–1	Kohl Center (2,984); Madison, WI
Nov 19, 2021*; 6:30 pm, ESPN+		at Bradley	L 57–64	1–2	Renaissance Coliseum (721); Peoria, IL
Nov 22, 2021*; 6:30 pm, ESPN+		Chicago State	L 63–71	1–3	Kohl Center (2,139); Madison, WI
Nov 24, 2021*; 6:00 pm, ESPN+		at Milwaukee	L 67–79	1–4	Klotsche Center (976); Milwaukee, WI
Nov 27, 2021*; 4:30 pm, P12N		vs. Boise State; Colorado Invitational	W 60–45	2–4	CU Events Center (952); Boulder, CO
Nov 28, 2021*; 1:00 pm, P12N		at Colorado; Colorado Invitational	L 51–67	2–5	CU Events Center (1,075); Boulder, CO
Dec 1, 2021*; 6:30 pm, BTN+		Virginia Tech; ACC–Big Ten Women's Challenge	L 60–70	2–6	Kohl Center (2,096); Madison, WI
Dec 5, 2021; 3:00 pm, BTN+		at Northwestern	L 49–61	2–7 (0–1)	Welsh-Ryan Arena (1,231); Evanston, IL
Dec 9, 2021; 8:00 pm, BTN		No. 13 Michigan	L 81–93	2–8 (0–2)	Kohl Center (2,669); Madison, WI
Dec 12, 2021*; 2:00 pm, BTN+		Green Bay	L 53–63	2–9	Kohl Center (3,906); Madison, WI
Dec 16, 2021*; 6:30 pm, BTN+		Illinois State	W 70–60	3–9	Kohl Center (2,150); Madison, WI
Jan 5, 2022; 6:30 pm, BTN+		No. 6 Indiana	L 53–76	3–10 (0–3)	Kohl Center (2,053); Madison, WI
Jan 9, 2022; 2:00 p.m., BTN+		at Illinois	L 47–68	3–11 (0–4)	State Farm Center (2,066); Champaign, IL
Jan 12, 2022; 6:30 pm, BTN+		Minnesota	L 66–82	3–12 (0–5)	Kohl Center (2,157); Madison, WI
Jan 16, 2022; 1:00 pm, BTN+		at Rutgers	W 49–45	4–12 (1–5)	Jersey Mike's Arena (1,581); Piscataway, NJ
Jan 20, 2022; 6:00 pm, BTN+		at No. 8 Michigan	L 44–83	4–13 (1–6)	Crisler Center (1,994); Ann Arbor, MI
Jan 23, 2022; 2:00 pm, BTN+		Penn State	W 69–57	5–13 (2–6)	Kohl Center (3,189); Madison, WI
Jan 27, 2022; 8:00 pm, BTN		at Nebraska	L 44–77	5–14 (2–7)	Pinnacle Bank Arena (3,528); Lincoln, NE
Jan 30, 2022; 2:00 pm, BTN		at Minnesota	L 55–57	5–15 (2–8)	Williams Arena (4,482); Minneapolis, MN
Feb 3, 2022; 6:30 pm, BTN+		No. 21 Iowa	L 50–84	5–16 (2–9)	Kohl Center (3,923); Madison, WI
Feb 6, 2022; 1:00 p.m., BTN		Illinois	W 70–62	6–16 (3–9)	Kohl Center (6,007); Madison, WI
Feb 9, 2022; 5:00 pm, BTN+		at No. 15 Maryland	L 43–70	6–17 (3–10)	Xfinity Center (4,123); College Park, MD
Feb 13, 2022; 1:00 pm, BTN+		Purdue	W 54–52	7–17 (4–10)	Kohl Center (2,869); Madison, WI
Feb 16, 2022; 6:30 pm, BTN+		Michigan State	L 67–74	7–18 (4–11)	Kohl Center (2,166); Madison, WI
Feb 20, 2022; 1:00 pm, BTN+		at No. 18 Ohio State	L 42–59	7–19 (4–12)	Value City Arena (5,683); Columbus, OH
Feb 23, 2022; 6:30 pm, BTN+		Nebraska	L 70–80	7–20 (4–13)	Kohl Center (2,425); Madison, WI
Feb 27, 2022; 12:00 pm, BTN+		at Purdue	W 63–62	8–20 (5–13)	Mackey Arena (4,811); West Lafayette, IN
Big Ten tournament
March 2, 2022; 3:30 pm, BTN	(11)	vs. (14) Illinois; First Round	L 66–75	8–21	Gainbridge Fieldhouse; Indianapolis, IN
*Non-conference game. ^{#}Rankings from AP Poll. (#) Tournament seedings in parentheses. All times are in Central Time.

== See also ==
2021–22 Wisconsin Badgers men's basketball team
