= 2021–22 Purdue Boilermakers women's basketball team =

Intercollegiate basketball season

2021–22 Purdue Boilermakers women's basketball

WNIT, second round
- Conference: Big Ten Conference
- Record: 17–15 (7–11 Big Ten)
- Head coach: Katie Gearlds (1st season)
- Assistant coaches: Beth Couture; Michael Scruggs
- Home arena: Mackey Arena

2021–22 Big Ten women's basketball standings
	Conf.				Overall
Team	W		L	PCT	W		L	PCT
No. 14 Ohio State	14	–	4	.778	25	–	7	.781
No. 8 Iowa †	14	–	4	.778	24	–	8	.750
No. 12 Michigan	13	–	4	.765	25	–	7	.781
No. 13 Maryland	13	–	4	.765	23	–	9	.719
No. 11 Indiana	11	–	5	.688	24	–	9	.727
Nebraska	11	–	7	.611	24	–	9	.727
Northwestern	8	–	8	.500	17	–	12	.586
Michigan State	8	–	9	.471	15	–	15	.500
Purdue	7	–	11	.389	17	–	15	.531
Minnesota	7	–	11	.389	15	–	18	.455
Penn State	5	–	13	.278	11	–	18	.379
Wisconsin	5	–	13	.278	8	–	21	.276
Rutgers	3	–	14	.176	11	–	20	.355
Illinois	1	–	13	.071	7	–	20	.259
† 2022 Big Ten tournament winner Rankings from AP poll

The 2021–22 Purdue Boilermakers women's basketball team represented Purdue University during the 2021–22 NCAA Division I women's basketball season. The Boilermakers, led by 1st-year head coach Katie Gearlds, played their home games at Mackey Arena and were a member of the Big Ten Conference.

They finished the season 17–15 and 7–11 in Big Ten play to finish in a tie for ninth place. As the ninth seed in the Big Ten tournament, they were defeated by Michigan State in the second round. They received an at-large bid to the WNIT. They defeated Southern Illinois in the first round before losing to Marquette in the second round to end their season.

== Previous season ==
The Boilermakers finished the season 7–16 and 4–14 in Big Ten play to finish in twelfth place. As the eleventh seed in the Big Ten tournament, they were defeated by Iowa in the second round. They were not invited to the NCAA tournament or the WNIT.

== Roster ==
2021–22 Purdue Boilermakers women's basketball team
Players
Coaches

Pos.	#	Name	Height	Year	Previous school	Hometown
G	0	Brooke Moore	5 ft 7 in (1.7 m)	Sr	Henry County; Auburn	Atlanta, GA
G	1	Skye Williams	5 ft 10 in (1.78 m)	Fr	Pickerington Central	Pickerington, OH
G	2	Rokia Doumbia	5 ft 9 in (1.75 m)	Jr	IMG Academy; Arkansas	Bamako, Mali
G	3	Jayla Smith	6 ft 0 in (1.83 m)	Fr	Lawrence North	Indianapolis, IN
G	5	Cassidy Hardin	5 ft 10 in (1.78 m)	Sr	Center Grove	Bargersville, IN
G	10	Jeanae Terry	5 ft 11 in (1.8 m)	So	Wayne Memorial; Illinois	Detroit, MI
G	13	Ajah Stallings	5 ft 9 in (1.75 m)	Sr	North Central	Indianapolis, IN
G/F	14	Ava Learn	6 ft 1 in (1.85 m)	Fr	Our Lady of Lourdes	Hyde Park, NY
G	23	Abbey Ellis	5 ft 6 in (1.68 m)	Jr	Our Lady of Mercy; Cal Poly	Melbourne, Australia
C	24	Ra Shaya Kyle	6 ft 6 in (1.98 m)	So	Marion	Marion, IN
F	30	Nyagoa Gony	6 ft 2 in (1.88 m)	Sr	Lincoln	Lincoln, NE
G	33	Madison Layden	6 ft 1 in (1.85 m)	So	Northwestern	Kokomo, IN
F	35	Rickie Woltman	6 ft 4 in (1.93 m)	Jr	Incarnate Word	St. Louis, MO

Head coach

- Katie Gearlds (Purdue)

Assistant coach(es)

- Beth Couture (Erskine)
- Michael Scruggs (Tennessee)

Legend

- (C) Team captain
- (S) Suspended
- (I) Ineligible
- (W) Walk-on
- Injured
- Current redshirt

Roster
Last update: May 5, 2022

== Schedule ==
Date time, TV	Rank^{#}	Opponent^{#}	Result	Record	Site (attendance) city, state
Exhibition
November 7, 2021*; 2:00 p.m., BTN+		Findlay	W 89–64	–	Mackey Arena (3,415); West Lafayette, IN
Regular season
November 10, 2021*; 7:30 p.m., ESPN+		at Western Kentucky	W 79–69	1–0	E. A. Diddle Arena (1,214); Bowling Green, KY
November 14, 2021*; 2:30 p.m., BTN		Western Michigan	W 70–62	2–0	Mackey Arena (2,062); West Lafayette, IN
November 14, 2021*; 7:00 p.m., ESPN+		at Illinois State	W 76–64	3–0	Redbird Arena (672); Normal, IL
November 20, 2021*; 6:00 p.m., BTN+		Dayton	L 62–78	3–1	Mackey Arena (1,938); West Lafayette, IN
November 22, 2021*; 7:00 p.m., BTN+		Marshall	W 70–60	4–1	Mackey Arena (1,526); West Lafayette, IN
November 25, 2021*; 5:00 p.m., FloHoops		vs. No. 22 West Virginia; St. Pete Showcase	L 57–65	4–2	McArthur Gymnasium (401); St. Petersburg, FL
November 27, 2021* p.m., FloHoops		vs. No. 17 Florida State; St. Pete Showcase	W 66–61	5–2	McArthur Center (250); St. Petersburg, FL
December 1, 2021*; 7:00 p.m., BTN		Georgia Tech; ACC–Big Ten Women's Challenge	W 53–52	6–2	Mackey Arena (1,539); West Lafayette, IN
December 5, 2021; 2:00 p.m., BTN+		No. 18 Ohio State	L 53–70	6–3 (0–1)	Mackey Arena (3,236); West Lafayette, IN
December 8, 2021*; 7:00 p.m., BTN+		at No. 8 Maryland	L 71–86	6–4 (0–2)	Xfinity Center (4,254); College Park, MD
December 12, 2021*; 2:00 p.m., BTN+		Denver	W 101–86	7–4	Mackey Arena (2,791); West Lafayette, IN
December 19, 2021*; 2:00 p.m., BTN+		Miami (OH)	W 82–76	8–4	Mackey Arena (3,006); West Lafayette, IN
December 21, 2021*; 11:00 a.m., BTN+		North Alabama	W 86–53	9–4	Mackey Arena (5,457); West Lafayette, IN
December 30, 2021; 9:00 p.m., BTN		at Wisconsin	Postponed to February 13, 2022		Kohl Center; Madison, WI
January 2, 2022; 2:00 p.m., BTN+		Rutgers	W 60–58	10–4 (1–2)	Mackey Arena (3,074); West Lafayette, IN
January 9, 2022; 2:00 p.m., BTN+		at Michigan State	W 69–59	11–4 (2–2)	Breslin Center (4,220); East Lansing, MI
January 13, 2022; 7:00 p.m., BTN+		Iowa	L 66–79	11–5 (2–3)	Mackey Arena (3,103); West Lafayette, IN
January 16, 2022; 2:00 p.m., FS1		No. 6 Indiana	L 68–73 ^{OT}	11–6 (2–4)	Mackey Arena (8,505); West Lafayette, IN
January 20, 2022; 8:00 p.m., BTN+		at Illinois	W 89–67	12–6 (3–4)	State Farm Center (1,038); Champaign, IL
January 6, 2022; 6:00 p.m., BTN		at No. 7 Michigan	L 66–79	12–7 (3–5)	Crisler Center (1,845); Ann Arbor, MI
January 27, 2022; 7:00 p.m., BTN+		Minnesota	W 80–66	13–7 (4–5)	Mackey Arena (2,901); West Lafayette, IN
January 30, 2022; 3:00 p.m., BTN+		at Nebraska	L 66–81	13–8 (4–6)	Pinnacle Bank Arena (4,810); Lincoln, NE
February 4, 2022; 6:00 p.m., BTN+		Northwestern	L 67–80	13–9 (4–7)	Mackey Arena (2,862); West Lafayette, IN
February 6, 2022; 1:00 p.m., BTN+		at No. 5 Indiana	L 57–64	13–10 (4–8)	Simon Skjodt Assembly Hall (7,891); Bloomington, IN
February 9, 2022; 7:00 p.m., BTN+		Penn State	W 81–77	14–10 (5–8)	Mackey Arena (2,902); West Lafayette, IN
February 13, 2022; 2:00 p.m., BTN+		at Wisconsin; Rescheduled from December 30, 2021	L 52–54	14–11 (5–9)	Kohl Center (2,869); Madison, WI
February 17, 2022; 7:00 p.m., BTN+		Illinois	W 70–54	15–11 (6–9)	Mackey Arena (2,983); West Lafayette, IN
February 20, 2022; 1:00 p.m., BTN		at Rutgers	W 70–59	16–11 (7–9)	Jersey Mike's Arena (2,961); Piscataway, NJ
February 24, 2022; 8:00 p.m., BTN+		at Northwestern	L 51–68	16–12 (7–10)	Welsh–Ryan Arena (1,481); Evanston, IL
February 27, 2022; 1:00 p.m., BTN+		Wisconsin	L 62–63	16–13 (7–11)	Mackey Arena (4,811); West Lafayette, IN
Big Ten Women's Tournament
March 3, 2022; 11:30 a.m., BTN	(9)	vs. (8) Michigan State; Second Round	L 69–73	16–14	Gainbridge Fieldhouse (0); Indianapolis, IN
WNIT
March 16, 2022; 7:00 p.m., BTN+		Southern Illinois; First Round	W 82–60	17–14	Mackey Arena (769); West Lafayette, IN
March 21, 2022; 8:00 p.m., FloHoops		at Marquette; Second Round	L 62–77	17–15	Al McGuire Center (1,311); Milwaukee, WI
*Non-conference game. ^{#}Rankings from AP Poll. (#) Tournament seedings in parentheses. All times are in Eastern Time.

== Rankings ==
Ranking movements Legend: ██ Increase in ranking ██ Decrease in ranking — = Not ranked RV = Received votes
	Week																		
Poll	Pre	1	2	3	4	5	6	7	8	9	10	11	12	13	14	15	16	17	Final
AP	—	—	—	—	RV	—	—	—	—	—	—	—	—	—	—	—	—	—	—
Coaches	—	—	—	—	—	—	—	—	—	—	—	—	—	—	—	—	—	—	—

Legend
	Increase in ranking
	Decrease in ranking
	Not ranked previous week
(RV)	Received votes
(NR)	Not ranked and did not receive votes
т	Tied with team above or below also with this symbol

The Coaches Poll did not release a Week 2 poll, and the AP Poll did not release a poll after the NCAA Tournament.
