= 2021–22 Michigan State Spartans women's basketball team =

Intercollegiate basketball season

2021–22 Michigan State Spartans women's basketball
- Conference: Big Ten Conference
- Record: 15–15 (8–9 Big Ten)
- Head coach: Suzy Merchant (15th season)
- Assistant coaches: Dean Lockwood; Maria Fantanarosa; Kristin Haynie
- Home arena: Breslin Center

2021–22 Big Ten women's basketball standings
	Conf.				Overall
Team	W		L	PCT	W		L	PCT
No. 14 Ohio State	14	–	4	.778	25	–	7	.781
No. 8 Iowa †	14	–	4	.778	24	–	8	.750
No. 12 Michigan	13	–	4	.765	25	–	7	.781
No. 13 Maryland	13	–	4	.765	23	–	9	.719
No. 11 Indiana	11	–	5	.688	24	–	9	.727
Nebraska	11	–	7	.611	24	–	9	.727
Northwestern	8	–	8	.500	17	–	12	.586
Michigan State	8	–	9	.471	15	–	15	.500
Purdue	7	–	11	.389	17	–	15	.531
Minnesota	7	–	11	.389	15	–	18	.455
Penn State	5	–	13	.278	11	–	18	.379
Wisconsin	5	–	13	.278	8	–	21	.276
Rutgers	3	–	14	.176	11	–	20	.355
Illinois	1	–	13	.071	7	–	20	.259
† 2022 Big Ten tournament winner Rankings from AP poll

The 2021–22 Michigan State Spartans women's basketball team represented Michigan State University during the 2021–22 NCAA Division I women's basketball season. The Spartans, led by fifteenth-year head coach Suzy Merchant, played their home games at the Breslin Center in East Lansing, Michigan as members of the Big Ten Conference.

They finished the season 15–15, 8–9 in Big Ten play to finish in eighth place. As the seventh seed in the Big Ten tournament, they defeated Purdue in the second round and Indiana in the quarterfinals before losing to Iowa in the semifinals. They were not invited to the NCAA tournament or the WNIT.

== Previous season ==
The Spartans finished the season 15–9, 8–7 in Big Ten play to finish in eighth place. As the eighth seed in the Big Ten tournament they defeated Purdue in the second round before losing to Ohio State in the quarterfinals. They received an at-large bid to the NCAA tournament, where they were the ten seed in the Mercado Regional. They lost in the first round to seven seed Iowa State to end their season.

== Roster ==
2021–22 Michigan State Spartans women's basketball team
Players
Coaches

Pos.	#	Name	Height	Year	Previous school	Hometown
G	0	DeeDee Hagemann	5 ft 7 in (1.7 m)	Fr	Detroit Edison	Detroit, IL
G/F	1	Tory Ozment	6 ft 1 in (1.85 m)	Sr	Buford	Buford, GA
F	2	Tamara Farquhar	6 ft 0 in (1.83 m)	GS	Dawson College; Purdue	Pierrefonds, Quebec
F	4	Alisia Smith	6 ft 3 in (1.91 m)	GS	Waverly; Penn State	Lansing, MI
G	5	Claire Hendrickson	5 ft 11 in (1.8 m)	RS Jr	Wyoming	Wyoming, MI
F	10	Lauren Walker	6 ft 2 in (1.88 m)	Fr	Marietta	Marietta, GA
G/F	11	Matilda Ekh	6 ft 0 in (1.83 m)	Fr	Riksbasketgymnasiet Luleå	Västerås, Sweden
F	12	Isaline Alexander	6 ft 3 in (1.91 m)	Fr	Bill Crothers Secondary School	Keswick, Ontario
F	14	Taiyier Parks	6 ft 3 in (1.91 m)	Jr	North Royalton	Cleveland, OH
F	20	Jayla James	6 ft 1 in (1.85 m)	Jr	Riverdale Baptist; Penn State	Upper Marlboro, MD
G	21	Laurel Jacqmain	5 ft 8 in (1.73 m)	GS	Nouvel Catholic	Saginaw, MI
G	22	Moira Joiner	5 ft 10 in (1.78 m)	Jr	Heritage	Saginaw, MI
C	23	Brooklyn Rewers	6 ft 4 in (1.93 m)	Fr	Lake City	Coeur d'Alene, ID
G	24	Nia Clouden	5 ft 8 in (1.73 m)	Sr	St. Frances	Owings Mills, MD
G	40	Julia Ayrault	6 ft 2 in (1.88 m)	Jr	Grosse Pointe North	Grosse Pointe Woods, MI

Head coach

- Suzy Merchant (Central Michigan)

Assistant coach(es)

- Dean Lockwood (Spring Arbor)
- Maria Fantanarosa (Miami (OH))
- Kristin Haynie (Michigan State)

Legend

- (C) Team captain
- (S) Suspended
- (I) Ineligible
- (W) Walk-on
- Injured
- Current redshirt

Roster
Last update: May 4, 2022

== Schedule and results ==
Date time, TV	Rank^{#}	Opponent^{#}	Result	Record	Site (attendance) city, state
Exhibition
October 31, 2021*; 2:00 p.m., BTN+		Northwood	W 95–49	–	Breslin Center (2,331); East Lansing, MI
Regular season
November 9, 2021*; 6:00 p.m., BTN+		Morehead State	W 93–31	1–0	Breslin Center (3,203); East Lansing, MI
November 14, 2021*; 2:00 p.m., BTN+		Niagara	W 89–65	2–0	Breslin Center (3,422); East Lansing, MI
November 16, 2021*; 7:00 p.m., BTN+		Valparaiso	W 73–62	3–0	Breslin Center (3,524); East Lansing, MI
November 19, 2021*; Noon, BTN+		Bryant	W 100–60	4–0	Breslin Center (2,533); East Lansing, MI
November 21, 2021*; 2:00 p.m., ESPN+		at Fordham	L 68–71	4–1	Rose Hill Gymnasium (425); Bronx, NY
November 23, 2021*; 2:00 p.m.		at St. Francis Brooklyn	L 63–66	4–2	The Pope (213); Brooklyn, NY
November 26, 2021*; 3:00 p.m., ESPN+		at Oakland	W 84–71	5–2	Athletics Center O'rena (1,219); Rochester, MI
November 28, 2021*; 2:00 p.m., BTN		Marshall	W 85–75	6–2	Breslin Center (3,938); East Lansing, MI
December 2, 2021*; 6:00 p.m., BTN		No. 24 Notre Dame; ACC–Big Ten Women's Challenge	L 71–76	6–3	Breslin Center (4,581); East Lansing, MI
December 5, 2021; 4:00 p.m., BTN		at No. 9 Iowa	L 61–88	6–4 (0–1)	Carver–Hawkeye Arena (6,942); Iowa City, IA
December 9, 2021; 7:00 p.m., BTN+		Illinois	W 75–60	7–4 (1–1)	Breslin Center (3,213); East Lansing, MI
December 20, 2021*; 11:00 a.m., FloHoops		vs. Florida Gulf Coast; West Palm Beach Invitational	L 84–85 ^{2OT}	7–5	Massimino Court (0); West Palm Beach, FL
December 20, 2021*; 11:00 a.m., FloHoops		vs. West Virginia; West Palm Beach Invitational	L 54–74	7–6	Massimino Court (0); West Palm Beach, FL
December 30, 2021; 3:00 p.m., BTN		Nebraska	W 72–69	8–6 (2–1)	Breslin Center (4,122); East Lansing, MI
January 3, 2022; 8:00 p.m., BTN+		at Northwestern	Canceled		Welsh–Ryan Arena; Evanston, IL
January 9, 2022; 2:00 p.m., BTN+		Purdue	L 59–69	8–7 (2–2)	Breslin Center (4,220); East Lansing, MI
January 12, 2022; 7:00 p.m., BTN+		at Ohio State	L 83–89	8–8 (2–3)	Value City Arena (2,917); Columbus, OH
January 16, 2022; 2:00 p.m., BTN+		Northwestern	W 65–46	9–8 (3–3)	Breslin Center (3,241); East Lansing, MI
January 19, 2022; 7:00 p.m., BTN+		at No. 6 Indiana	Postponed to February 12		Simon Skjodt Assembly Hall; Bloomington, IN
January 23, 2022; 2:00 p.m., BTN+		Minnesota	W 74–71	10–8 (4–3)	Breslin Center (2,899); East Lansing, MI
January 27, 2022; 7:00 p.m., BTN+		at Penn State	W 79–58	11–8 (5–3)	Bryce Jordan Center (1,551); University Park
January 30, 2022; 2:00 p.m., BTN+		at Rutgers	W 61–45	12–8 (6–3)	Jersey Mike's Arena (1,335); Piscataway, NJ
February 3, 2022; 6:00 p.m., BTN		No. 17 Maryland	L 62–67	12–9 (6–4)	Breslin Center (2,563); East Lansing, MI
February 6, 2022; 3:00 p.m., BTN+		at Minnesota	L 60–71	12–10 (6–5)	Williams Arena (3,150); Minneapolis, MN
February 10, 2022; 6:30 p.m., BTN		No. 4 Michigan; Rivalry	W 63–57	13–10 (7–5)	Breslin Center (4,764); East Lansing, MI
February 12, 2022; 3:00 p.m., BTN+		at No. 7 Indiana; Rescheduled from January 19	L 58–76	13–11 (7–6)	Simon Skjodt Assembly Hall (5,560); Bloomington, IN
February 16, 2022; 7:30 p.m., BTN+		at Wisconsin	W 74–67	14–11 (8–6)	Kohl Center (2,166); Madison, WI
February 21, 2022; 6:00 p.m., BTN		Penn State	L 71–79	14–12 (8–7)	Breslin Center (2,985); East Lansing, MI
February 24, 2022; 6:00 p.m., BTN		at No. 6 Michigan; Rivalry	L 51–62	14–13 (8–8)	Crisler Center (5,460); Ann Arbor, MI
February 27, 2022; 2:30 p.m., BTN		No. 17 Ohio State	L 55–61	14–14 (8–9)	Breslin Center (7,124); East Lansing, MI
Big Ten tournament
March 3, 2022; 11:30 a.m., BTN	(8)	vs. (9) Purdue; Second Round	W 73–69	15–14	Gainbridge Fieldhouse (0); Indianapolis, IN
March 4, 2022; 11:30 a.m., BTN	(8)	vs. (1) No. 13 Ohio State; Quarterfinals	L 58–74	15–15	Gainbridge Fieldhouse (0); Indianapolis, IN
*Non-conference game. ^{#}Rankings from AP Poll. (#) Tournament seedings in parentheses. All times are in Eastern Time.

== Rankings ==
Ranking movements Legend: ██ Increase in ranking ██ Decrease in ranking — = Not ranked RV = Received votes
	Week																		
Poll	Pre	1	2	3	4	5	6	7	8	9	10	11	12	13	14	15	16	17	Final
AP	RV	RV	RV	—	—	—	—	—	—	—	—	—	—	—	—	—	—	—	—
Coaches	RV	RV	—	—	—	—	—	—	—	—	—	—	—	—	—	—	—	—	—

Legend
	Increase in ranking
	Decrease in ranking
	Not ranked previous week
(RV)	Received votes
(NR)	Not ranked and did not receive votes
т	Tied with team above or below also with this symbol

The Coaches Poll did not release a Week 2 poll, and the AP Poll did not release a poll after the NCAA Tournament.
