= 2021–22 Nebraska Cornhuskers women's basketball team =

Intercollegiate basketball season

2021–22 Nebraska Cornhuskers women's basketball

NCAA tournament, first round
- Conference: Big Ten Conference
- Record: 24–9 (11–7 Big Ten)
- Head coach: Amy Williams (6th season)
- Assistant coaches: Tom Goehle; Chuck Love; Tandem Mays
- Home arena: Pinnacle Bank Arena

2021–22 Big Ten women's basketball standings
	Conf.				Overall
Team	W		L	PCT	W		L	PCT
No. 14 Ohio State	14	–	4	.778	25	–	7	.781
No. 8 Iowa †	14	–	4	.778	24	–	8	.750
No. 12 Michigan	13	–	4	.765	25	–	7	.781
No. 13 Maryland	13	–	4	.765	23	–	9	.719
No. 11 Indiana	11	–	5	.688	24	–	9	.727
Nebraska	11	–	7	.611	24	–	9	.727
Northwestern	8	–	8	.500	17	–	12	.586
Michigan State	8	–	9	.471	15	–	15	.500
Purdue	7	–	11	.389	17	–	15	.531
Minnesota	7	–	11	.389	15	–	18	.455
Penn State	5	–	13	.278	11	–	18	.379
Wisconsin	5	–	13	.278	8	–	21	.276
Rutgers	3	–	14	.176	11	–	20	.355
Illinois	1	–	13	.071	7	–	20	.259
† 2022 Big Ten tournament winner Rankings from AP poll

The 2021–22 Nebraska Cornhuskers women's basketball team represented the University of Nebraska during the 2021–22 NCAA Division I women's basketball season. The Cornhuskers, led by sixth-year head coach Amy Williams, played their home games at Pinnacle Bank Arena and were members of the Big Ten Conference.

They finished the season 24–9, 11–7 in Big Ten play to finish in sixth place. As the sixth seed in the Big Ten women's tournament, they defeated Illinois in the second round and Michigan in the quarterfinals before losing to eventual champions Iowa in the semifinals. They received an at-large bid to the NCAA tournament as the eighth seed in the Wichita Regional. They lost to Gonzaga in the first round to end their season.

== Previous season ==
The Cornhuskers finished the season 13–13, 9–10 in Big Ten play to finish in ninth place. As the eight seed in the Big Ten women's tournament. they defeated Minnesota in the second round before losing to eventual champions Maryland in the quarterfinals. They received an at-large bid to the WNIT. They played in the Memphis regional and defeated UT Martin in the first round before losing to Colorado in the second round to end their season.

== Roster ==
2021–22 Nebraska Cornhuskers women's basketball team
Players
Coaches

Pos.	#	Name	Height	Year	Previous school	Hometown
G	1	Jaz Shelley	5 ft 9 in (1.75 m)	So	Berwick College; Oregon	Moe, VIC, Australia
G	2	Trinity Brady	5 ft 11 in (1.8 m)	So	Hamilton Heights Christian	Indianapolis IN
G	3	Allison Weidner	5 ft 10 in (1.78 m)	Fr	Humphrey	Humphrey, NE
G	4	Sam Haiby	5 ft 9 in (1.75 m)	Jr	Moorhead	Moorhead, MN
G	5	Mi'Cole Cayton	5 ft 9 in (1.75 m)	GS	Saint Mary's College; Cal	Stockton, CA
G	10	Whitney Brown	5 ft 8 in (1.73 m)	Fr	Grand Island Northwest	Grand Island, NE
G	11	Ruby Porter	5 ft 10 in (1.78 m)	Fr	Adelaide Lightning	Adelaide, Australia
F	14	Bella Cravens	6 ft 3 in (1.91 m)	Jr	Maryknoll School; Eastern Washington	Laie, HI
G	15	Kendall Moriarty	6 ft 1 in (1.85 m)	Fr	Benet Academy	Wheaton, IL
F	21	Annika Stewart	6 ft 3 in (1.91 m)	Fr	Wayzata	Minneapolis, MN
G	24	Nailah Dillard	5 ft 9 in (1.75 m)	So	Inderkum; Texas Tech	Sacramento, CA
G/F	32	Kendall Coley	6 ft 2 in (1.88 m)	Fr	St. Louis Park	Minneapolis, MN
F/C	33	Tatiana Popa	6 ft 5 in (1.96 m)	RS Fr	Brewster Academy	Parkersburg, WV
F	34	Isabelle Bourne	6 ft 2 in (1.88 m)	So	Australian Institute of Sport	Canberra, Australia
F/C	40	Alexis Markowski	6 ft 3 in (1.91 m)	Fr	Pius X	Lincoln, NE

Head coach

- Amy Williams (Nebraska)

Assistant coach(es)

- Chuck Love (Northwestern Oklahoma State)
- Tom Goehle (Augustana (SD))
- Tandem Mays (Tulsa)

Legend

- (C) Team captain
- (S) Suspended
- (I) Ineligible
- (W) Walk-on
- Injured
- Current redshirt

Roster
Last update: April 26, 2021

== Schedule ==
Date time, TV	Rank^{#}	Opponent^{#}	Result	Record	Site (attendance) city, state
Exhibition
November 1, 2021*; 7:30 p.m., BTN+		Midland	W 87–42	–	Pinnacle Bank Arena; Lincoln, NE
Regular season
November 9, 2021*; Noon, BTN+		Maine	W 108–50	1–0	Pinnacle Bank Arena (4,476); Lincoln, NE
November 11, 2021*; 7:00 p.m., BTN+		Prairie View A&M	W 102–47	2–0	Pinnacle Bank Arena (3,155); Lincoln, NE
November 14, 2021*; 2:00 p.m., BTN+		Alabama A&M	W 88–33	3–0	Pinnacle Bank Arena (3,526); Lincoln, NE
November 17, 2021*; 7:00 p.m., BTN+		Creighton	W 67–62	4–0	Pinnacle Bank Arena (4,042); Lincoln, NE
November 20, 2021*; Noon, BTN+		North Carolina Central	W 113–58	5–0	Pinnacle Bank Arena (3,225); Lincoln, NE
November 26, 2021*; 6:00 p.m.		vs. Drexel; Dana on Mission Bay Holiday Tournament	W 65–53	6–0	Jenny Craig Pavilion (368); San Diego, CA
November 27, 2021*; 6:00 p.m.		at San Diego; Dana on Mission Bay Holiday Tournament	W 64–56	7–0	Jenny Craig Pavilion (286); San Diego, CA
December 1, 2021*; 6:00 p.m., ACCRSN		at Wake Forest; ACC–Big Ten Women's Challenge	W 86–60	8–0	LJVM Coliseum (501); Winston-Salem, NC
December 6, 2021; 7:00 p.m., BTN		at Minnesota	W 70–67	9–0 (1–0)	Williams Arena (3,300); Minneapolis, MN
December 11, 2021*; 1:00 p.m., BTN+		Indiana State	W 78–50	10–0	Pinnacle Bank Arena (3,883); Lincoln, NE
December 19, 2021*; Noon, BTN+		Drake	W 89–68	11–0	Pinnacle Bank Arena (4,849); Lincoln, NE
December 22, 2021*; Noon, BTN+		Wyoming	W 72–61	12–0	Pinnacle Bank Arena (4,566); Lincoln, NE
December 30, 2021; 2:00 p.m., BTN		at Michigan State	L 69–72	12–1 (1–1)	Breslin Center (4,122); East Lansing, MI
January 4, 2022; 8:00 p.m., BTN		No. 8 Michigan	W 79–58	13–1 (2–1)	Pinnacle Bank Arena (3,591); Lincoln, NE
January 9, 2022; 1:00 p.m., FS1		No. 22 Iowa	L 86–95	13–2 (2–2)	Pinnacle Bank Arena (8,415); Lincoln, NE
January 13, 2022; 5:00 p.m., BTN		at No. 6 Indiana	L 65–72	13–3 (2–3)	Simon Skjodt Assembly Hall (3,477); Bloomington, IN
January 16, 2022; 5:10 p.m., BTN		at Iowa	L 83–93	13–4 (2–4)	Carver–Hawkeye Arena (8,473); Iowa City, IA
January 27, 2022; 8:00 p.m., BTN		Wisconsin	W 77–44	14–4 (3–4)	Pinnacle Bank Arena (3,528); Lincoln, NE
January 30, 2022; 2:00 p.m.		Purdue	W 81–66	15–4 (4–4)	Pinnacle Bank Arena (4,810); Lincoln, NE
February 1, 2022; 7:00 p.m.		Rutgers	W 50–38	16–4 (5–4)	Pinnacle Bank Arena (3,503); Lincoln, NE
February 3, 2022; 7:00 p.m., BTN		Penn State	W 76–61	17–4 (6–4)	Pinnacle Bank Arena (3,839); Lincoln, NE
February 6, 2022; Noon, BTN+		at No. 17 Maryland	L 65–80	17–5 (6–5)	Xfinity Center (6,047); College Park, MD
February 10, 2022; 6:00 p.m., FS1		at No. 21 Ohio State	L 70–80	17–6 (6–6)	Value City Arena (3,135); Columbus, OH
February 12, 2022; 2:00 p.m., BTN+		at Illinois	W 82–63	18–6 (7–6)	State Farm Center (1,182); Champaign, IL
February 14, 2022; 6:00 p.m., BTN		No. 5 Indiana	W 72–55	19–6 (8–6)	Pinnacle Bank Arena (4,109); Lincoln, NE
February 17, 2022; 6:00 p.m., BTN+		at Penn State	L 76–83	19–7 (8–7)	Bryce Jordan Center (1,801); University Park
February 20, 2022; 2:00 p.m., BTN+		Minnesota	W 93–70	20–7 (9–7)	Pinnacle Bank Arena (6,566); Lincoln, NE
February 23, 2022; 6:30 p.m., BTN+		at Wisconsin	W 80–70	21–7 (10–7)	Kohl Center (2,425); Madison, WI
February 27, 2022; 3:30 p.m., BTN		Northwestern	W 73–59	22–7 (11–7)	Pinnacle Bank Arena (6,234); Lincoln, NE
Big Ten Women's Tournament
March 3, 2022; 7:30 p.m., BTN	(6)	vs. (14) Illinois; Second Round	W 92–74	23–7	Gainbridge Fieldhouse (0); Indianapolis, IN
March 4, 2022; 7:30 p.m., BTN	(6)	vs. (3) No. 10 Michigan; Quarterfinals	W 76–73	24–7	Gainbridge Fieldhouse (0); Indianapolis, IN
March 5, 2022; 5:00 p.m., BTN	(6)	vs. (2) No. 12 Iowa; Semifinals	L 66–83	24–8	Gainbridge Fieldhouse (7,749); Indianapolis, IN
NCAA tournament
March 18, 2022; 2:30 p.m., ESPNews	(8W)	vs. (9W) Gonzaga; First Round	L 55–68	24–9	KFC Yum! Center (0); Louisville, KY
*Non-conference game. ^{#}Rankings from AP Poll. (#) Tournament seedings in parentheses. W=Wichita. All times are in CST Time.

== Rankings ==
Regular season polls
Poll	Pre- season	Week 2	Week 3	Week 4	Week 5	Week 6	Week 7	Week 8	Week 9	Week 10	Week 11	Week 12	Week 13	Week 14	Week 15	Week 16	Week 17	Final
AP					RV	RV	RV	RV	RV	RV			RV	RV	RV			RV
Coaches				RV	RV	RV	RV	RV	RV	RV		RV	RV	RV	RV	RV	RV	RV

Legend
	Increase in ranking
	Decrease in ranking
	Not ranked previous week
(RV)	Received votes
(NR)	Not ranked and did not receive votes

The Coaches Poll did not release a Week 2 poll, and the AP Poll did not release a poll after the NCAA Tournament.
