= 2022 Big Ten women's basketball tournament =

- Classification: Division I
- Season: 2021–22
- Teams: 14
- Site: Gainbridge Fieldhouse; Indianapolis, IN
- Champions: Iowa (4th title)
- Winning coach: Lisa Bluder (3rd title)
- MVP: Caitlin Clark (Iowa)
- Television: BTN, ESPN2

2021–22 Big Ten women's basketball standings
	Conf.				Overall
Team	W		L	PCT	W		L	PCT
No. 14 Ohio State	14	–	4	.778	25	–	7	.781
No. 8 Iowa †	14	–	4	.778	24	–	8	.750
No. 12 Michigan	13	–	4	.765	25	–	7	.781
No. 13 Maryland	13	–	4	.765	23	–	9	.719
No. 11 Indiana	11	–	5	.688	24	–	9	.727
Nebraska	11	–	7	.611	24	–	9	.727
Northwestern	8	–	8	.500	17	–	12	.586
Michigan State	8	–	9	.471	15	–	15	.500
Purdue	7	–	11	.389	17	–	15	.531
Minnesota	7	–	11	.389	15	–	18	.455
Penn State	5	–	13	.278	11	–	18	.379
Wisconsin	5	–	13	.278	8	–	21	.276
Rutgers	3	–	14	.176	11	–	20	.355
Illinois	1	–	13	.071	7	–	20	.259
† 2022 Big Ten tournament winner Rankings from AP poll

The 2022 Big Ten women's basketball tournament was a postseason tournament held from March 2–6, 2022 at Gainbridge Fieldhouse in Indianapolis. The winner of this tournament, Iowa, earned an automatic bid to the 2022 NCAA Division I women's basketball tournament.

== Seeds ==
All 14 Big Ten schools are participating in the tournament. Teams will be seeded by 2021–22 Big Ten Conference season record. The top 10 teams receive a first-round bye and the top four teams receive a double bye.

Seed	School	Conf	Tiebreaker
1	Ohio State‡##	14–4	1–0 vs. Iowa
2	Iowa‡##	14–4	0–1 vs. Ohio State
3	Michigan##	13–4	2–0 vs. Maryland
4	Maryland##	13–4	0–2 vs. Michigan
5	Indiana#	11–5	
6	Nebraska#	11–7	
7	Northwestern#	8–8	
8	Michigan State#	8–9	
9	Purdue#	7–11	1–0 vs. Minnesota
10	Minnesota#	7–11	0–1 vs. Purdue
11	Wisconsin	5–13	1–0 vs. Penn State
12	Penn State	5–13	0–1 vs. Wisconsin
13	Rutgers	3–14	
14	Illinois	1–13	
‡ – Big Ten Conference regular season champions. ## – Received a double bye in the conference tournament. # – Received a first-round bye in the conference tournament. Overall record are as of the end of the regular season.

== Schedule ==
Game	Time*	Matchup^{#}	Score	Television	Attendance
First round – Wednesday, March 2
1	2:00 pm	No. 12 Penn State vs. No. 13 Rutgers	50−75	BTN	0
2	4:30 pm	No. 11 Wisconsin vs. No. 14 Illinois	66−75	BTN	0
Second round – Thursday, March 3
3	11:30 am	No. 8 Michigan State vs. No. 9 Purdue	73−69	BTN	0
4	25 min. after game 3	No. 5 Indiana vs. No. 13 Rutgers	66−54	BTN	0
5	6:30 pm	No. 7 Northwestern vs. No. 10 Minnesota	65−60	BTN	0
6	25 min. after game 5	No. 6 Nebraska vs. No. 14 Illinois	92−74	BTN	0
Quarterfinals – Friday, March 4
7	11:30 am	No. 1 Ohio State vs. No. 8 Michigan State	74−58	BTN	0
8	25 min. after game 7	No. 4 Maryland vs. No. 5 Indiana	51−62	BTN	0
9	6:30 pm	No. 2 Iowa vs. No. 7 Northwestern	72−59	BTN	0
10	25 min. after game 9	No. 3 Michiganvs. No. 6 Nebraska	73−76	BTN	0
Semifinals – Saturday, March 5
11	3:30 pm	No. 1 Ohio State vs. No. 5 Indiana	62−70	BTN	7,749
12	6:00 pm	No. 2 Iowa vs. No. 6 Nebraska	83−66	BTN	7,749
Championship – Sunday, March 6
13	4:00 pm	No. 5 Indiana vs. No. 2 Iowa	67−74	ESPN2	8,709
*Game times in Eastern Time. #Rankings denote tournament seeding.

== Bracket ==
- All times are Eastern.

First round Wednesday, March 2 BTN
12	Penn State	50
13	Rutgers	75
11	Wisconsin	66
14	Illinois	75

Second round Thursday, March 3 BTN
8	Michigan State	73
9	Purdue	69
5	Indiana	66
13	Rutgers	54
7	Northwestern	65
10	Minnesota	60
6	Nebraska	92
14	Illinois	74

Quarterfinals; Friday, March 4 BTN
1	Ohio State	74
8	Michigan State	58
4	Maryland	51
5	Indiana	62
2	Iowa	72
7	Northwestern	59
3	Michigan	73
6	Nebraska	76

Semifinals; Saturday, March 5 BTN
1	Ohio State	62
5	Indiana	70
2	Iowa	83
6	Nebraska	66

Championship; Sunday, March 6 ESPN2
5	Indiana	67
2	Iowa	74

* denotes overtime period

== All-Tournament team ==
- Caitlin Clark, Iowa – Most Outstanding Player
- Monika Czinano, Iowa
- Grace Berger, Indiana
- Nicole Cardaño-Hillary, Indiana
- Jacy Sheldon, Ohio State
