= 2021–22 Illinois Fighting Illini women's basketball team =

Intercollegiate basketball season

2021–22 Illinois Fighting Illini women's basketball
- Conference: Big Ten Conference
- Record: 7–20 (1–13 Big Ten)
- Head coach: Nancy Fahey (5th season)
- Assistant coaches: John Patterson; Corry Irvin; Hernando Planells
- Home arena: State Farm Center

2021–22 Big Ten women's basketball standings
	Conf.				Overall
Team	W		L	PCT	W		L	PCT
No. 14 Ohio State	14	–	4	.778	25	–	7	.781
No. 8 Iowa †	14	–	4	.778	24	–	8	.750
No. 12 Michigan	13	–	4	.765	25	–	7	.781
No. 13 Maryland	13	–	4	.765	23	–	9	.719
No. 11 Indiana	11	–	5	.688	24	–	9	.727
Nebraska	11	–	7	.611	24	–	9	.727
Northwestern	8	–	8	.500	17	–	12	.586
Michigan State	8	–	9	.471	15	–	15	.500
Purdue	7	–	11	.389	17	–	15	.531
Minnesota	7	–	11	.389	15	–	18	.455
Penn State	5	–	13	.278	11	–	18	.379
Wisconsin	5	–	13	.278	8	–	21	.276
Rutgers	3	–	14	.176	11	–	20	.355
Illinois	1	–	13	.071	7	–	20	.259
† 2022 Big Ten tournament winner Rankings from AP poll

The 2021–22 Illinois Fighting Illini women's basketball team represented the University of Illinois during the 2021–22 NCAA Division I women's basketball season. The Fighting Illini, led by fifth-year head coach Nancy Fahey, played their home games at State Farm Center as members of the Big Ten Conference.

They finished the season 7–20, 1–13 in Big Ten play to finish in fourteenth place. As the fourteenth seed in the Big Ten women's tournament, they defeated eleventh seed Wisconsin in the First Round before losing to sixth seed Nebraska in the Second Round. They were not invited to the NCAA tournament or the WNIT.

== Previous season ==
Due to the COVID-19 pandemic in the United States, the Illini played fewer non-conference games than in previous seasons; three games were originally postponed and later canceled due to the pandemic. They finished the season 5–18, 2–16 in Big Ten play to finish in thirteenth place. They lost in the second round of the Big Ten women's tournament to Northwestern. Their first round win against Wisconsin was the first Big Ten tournament victory in coach Fahey's tenure at Illinois.

== Roster ==
2021–22 Illinois Fighting Illini women's basketball team
Players
Coaches

Pos.	#	Name	Height	Year	Previous school	Hometown
G	0	Sara Anastasieska	5 ft 11 in (1.8 m)	GS	Monte Sant Angelo Mercy; Duke	Sydney, Australia
F	2	Lyric Robins	5 ft 11 in (1.8 m)	RS Sr	Plano West	Plano, TX
F	3	Solape Amusan	6 ft 1 in (1.85 m)	Jr	Woodbury	Woodbury, MN
G	5	De'Myla Brown	5 ft 7 in (1.7 m)	Jr	North Little Rock; Chipola College	North Little Rock, AR
G	11	Jada Peebles	5 ft 10 in (1.78 m)	Jr	Wakefield	Raleigh, NC
G	12	Jayla Oden	5 ft 9 in (1.75 m)	Fr	McDonogh	Baltimore, MD
G	13	Tara O'Malley	5 ft 6 in (1.68 m)	GS	Mother McAuley	Chicago, IL
F/C	14	Geovana Lopes	6 ft 3 in (1.91 m)	Sr	Odessa College	Bataguassu, Brazil
F	15	Keanna Rembert	6 ft 2 in (1.88 m)	Fr	Millbrook	Raleigh, NC
F	20	Erika Porter	6 ft 3 in (1.91 m)	So	Notre Dame H.S.	West Windsor, NJ
C	22	Eva Rubin	6 ft 5 in (1.96 m)	RS Sr	Homewood-Flossmoor	Flossmoor, IL
G	24	Adalia McKenzie	5 ft 10 in (1.78 m)	Fr	Park Center	Brooklyn Park, MN
G	32	Aaliyah Nye	5 ft 11 in (1.8 m)	So	East Lansing	East Lansing, MI
F	44	Kendall Bostic	6 ft 2 in (1.88 m)	So	Northwestern H.S.	Kokomo, IN

Head coach

- Nancy Fahey (Wisconsin)

Assistant coach(es)

- John Patterson (Fontbonne)
- Cory Irvin (Fresno State)
- Hernando Planells (Regis)

Legend

- (C) Team captain
- (S) Suspended
- (I) Ineligible
- (W) Walk-on
- Injured
- Current redshirt

Roster
Last update: May 12, 2022

== Schedule ==
Date time, TV	Rank^{#}	Opponent^{#}	Result	Record	Site (attendance) city, state
Regular season
November 9, 2021*; 11:00 a.m., BTN+		North Carolina Central	W 73–56	1–0	State Farm Center (1,983); Champaign, IL
November 14, 2021*; 3:00 p.m., BTN+		Miami (OH)	W 72–65	2–0	State Farm Center (1,121); Champaign, IL
November 18, 2021*; 7:00 p.m., BTN+		SIUE	L 62–71	2–1	State Farm Center (1,008); Champaign, IL
November 21, 2021*; 2:00 p.m., BTN+		UC Riverside	W 86–82	3–1	State Farm Center (1,053); Champaign, IL
November 26, 2021*; 1:15 p.m., FloHoops		vs. Dayton; Daytona Beach Invitational	L 53–67	3–2	Ocean Center (0); Daytona Beach, FL
November 27, 2021*; 11:00 a.m., FloHoops		vs. Middle Tennessee; Daytona Beach Invitational	L 52–62	3–3	Ocean Center (0); Daytona Beach, FL
December 2, 2021*; 7:00 p.m., BTN+		No. 25 Florida State; ACC–Big Ten Women's Challenge	L 58–67	3–4	State Farm Center (1,027); Champaign, IL
December 5, 2021*; 2:00 p.m., BTN+		Eastern Kentucky	W 71–57	4–4	State Farm Center (1,227); Champaign, IL
December 9, 2021; 6:00 p.m., BTN+		at Michigan State	L 60–75	4–5 (0–1)	Breslin Center (3,213); East Lansing, MI
December 12, 2021*; 2:00 p.m., BTN+		Butler	W 78–66	5–5	State Farm Center (1,015); Champaign, IL
December 19, 2021*; 2:00 p.m., ESPN+		at Southern Illinois	L 51–66	5–6	Banterra Center (539); Carbondale, IL
December 22, 2021*; Noon, BTN+		Missouri	L 65–84	5–7	State Farm Center (1,247); Champaign, IL
December 30, 2021; 7:00 p.m., BTN+		No. 6 Maryland	Canceled		State Farm Center; Champaign, IL
January 6, 2022; 6:00 p.m., BTN+		at Ohio State	L 69–90	5–8 (0–2)	Value City Arena (2,567); Columbus, OH
January 9, 2022; 2:00 p.m., BTN+		Wisconsin	W 68–47	6–8 (1–2)	State Farm Center (2,066); Champaign, IL
January 16, 2022; 1:00 p.m., BTN+		at Penn State	L 72–90	6–9 (1–3)	Bryce Jordan Center (2,048); University Park, PA
January 20, 2022; 7:00 p.m., BTN+		Purdue	L 67–89	6–10 (1–4)	State Farm Center (1,038); Champaign, IL
January 23, 2022; 5:00 p.m., BTN		at No. 25 Iowa	L 56–82	6–11 (1–5)	Carver–Hawkeye Arena (8,977); Iowa City, IA
January 27, 2022; 6:00 p.m., BTN+		at No. 6 Indiana	Canceled		Simon Skjodt Assembly Hall; Bloomington, IN
January 30, 2022; 2:00 p.m., BTN+		at Northwestern	Canceled		Welsh-Ryan Arena; Evanston, IL
February 3, 2022; 7:00 p.m., BTN+		No. 6 Michigan	Canceled		State Farm Center; Champaign, IL
February 6, 2022; 1:00 p.m., BTN		at Wisconsin	L 62–70	6–12 (1–6)	Kohl Center (6,007); Madison, WI
February 9, 2022; 7:00 p.m., BTN+		No. 7 Indiana	L 61–93	6–13 (1–7)	State Farm Center (1,198); Champaign, IL
February 12, 2022; 2:00 p.m., BTN+		Nebraska	L 63–82	6–14 (1–8)	State Farm Center (1,182); Champaign, IL
February 14, 2022; 8:00 p.m., BTN+		No. 18 Ohio State	L 67–86	6–15 (1–9)	State Farm Center (997); Champaign, IL
February 17, 2022; 6:00 p.m., BTN+		at Purdue	L 54–70	6–16 (1–10)	Mackey Arena (2,983); West Lafayette, IN
February 20, 2022; 4:00 p.m., BTN+		Northwestern	L 59–82	6–17 (1–11)	State Farm Center (942); Champaign, IL
February 24, 2022; 7:00 p.m., BTN+		at Minnesota	L 54–87	6–18 (1–12)	Williams Arena (2,896); Minneapolis, MN
February 27, 2022; 2:00 p.m., BTN+		Rutgers	L 56–66	6–19 (1–13)	State Farm Center (1,445); Champaign, IL
Big Ten Women's Tournament
March 2, 2022; 3:30 p.m., BTN	(14)	vs. (11) Wisconsin; First Round	W 75–66	7–19	Gainbridge Fieldhouse (0); Indianapolis, IN
March 3, 2022; 7:30 p.m., BTN	(14)	vs. (6) Nebraska; Second Round	L 74–92	7–20	Gainbridge Fieldhouse (0); Indianapolis, IN
*Non-conference game. ^{#}Rankings from AP Poll. (#) Tournament seedings in parentheses. All times are in Central Time.

== Rankings ==
Ranking movements Legend: — = Not ranked
	Week																		
Poll	Pre	1	2	3	4	5	6	7	8	9	10	11	12	13	14	15	16	17	Final
AP	—	—	—	—	—	—	—	—	—	—	—	—	—	—	—	—	—	—	—
Coaches	—	—	—	—	—	—	—	—	—	—	—	—	—	—	—	—	—	—	—

Legend
	Increase in ranking
	Decrease in ranking
	Not ranked previous week
(RV)	Received votes
(NR)	Not ranked and did not receive votes

The Coaches Poll did not release a Week 2 poll, and the AP Poll did not release a poll after the NCAA Tournament.
