= 2021–22 Rutgers Scarlet Knights women's basketball team =

Intercollegiate basketball season

2021–22 Rutgers Scarlet Knights women's basketball
- Conference: Big Ten Conference
- Record: 11–20 (3–14 Big Ten)
- Head coach: C. Vivian Stringer (27th season)
- Assistant coaches: Timothy Eatman; Nadine Domond; Michelle Edwards
- Home arena: Jersey Mike's Arena

2021–22 Big Ten women's basketball standings
	Conf.				Overall
Team	W		L	PCT	W		L	PCT
No. 14 Ohio State	14	–	4	.778	25	–	7	.781
No. 8 Iowa †	14	–	4	.778	24	–	8	.750
No. 12 Michigan	13	–	4	.765	25	–	7	.781
No. 13 Maryland	13	–	4	.765	23	–	9	.719
No. 11 Indiana	11	–	5	.688	24	–	9	.727
Nebraska	11	–	7	.611	24	–	9	.727
Northwestern	8	–	8	.500	17	–	12	.586
Michigan State	8	–	9	.471	15	–	15	.500
Purdue	7	–	11	.389	17	–	15	.531
Minnesota	7	–	11	.389	15	–	18	.455
Penn State	5	–	13	.278	11	–	18	.379
Wisconsin	5	–	13	.278	8	–	21	.276
Rutgers	3	–	14	.176	11	–	20	.355
Illinois	1	–	13	.071	7	–	20	.259
† 2022 Big Ten tournament winner Rankings from AP poll

The 2021–22 Rutgers Scarlet Knights women's basketball team represented Rutgers University during the 2021–22 NCAA Division I women's basketball season. The Scarlet Knights, led by 27th-year head coach C. Vivian Stringer, played their home games at the Jersey Mike's Arena, as a member of the Big Ten Conference.

They finished the season 11–20, 3–14 in Big Ten play to finish in thirteenth place. As the thirteenth seed in the Big Ten women's tournament, they defeated Penn State in the first round before losing to Indiana in the second round. They were not invited to the NCAA tournament or the WNIT.

== Previous season ==
The Scarlet Knights finished the season 14–5, 10–3 in Big Ten play to finish in third place. They received a double-bye into the quarterfinals of the Big Ten women's tournament when they lost to Iowa. They received an at-large bid to the NCAA tournament. As the six seed in the Mercado Regional they lost to BYU in the first round to end their season.

== Roster ==
2021–22 Rutgers Scarlet Knights women's basketball team
Players
Coaches

Pos.	#	Name	Height	Year	Previous school	Hometown
G	0	Lasha Petree	6 ft 0 in (1.83 m)	Sr	Arbor Prep; Bradley	Detroit, MI
G	1	Destiny Marshall	5 ft 10 in (1.78 m)	RS Jr	Grovetown; Jacksonville	Augusta, GA
G	3	Shug Dickson	5 ft 10 in (1.78 m)	GS	Lutheran North; Missouri	St. Louis, MO
G	5	Victoria Morris	5 ft 8 in (1.73 m)	GS	North College Hill; Old Dominion	Cincinnati, OH
G/F	10	Erica LaFayette	6 ft 0 in (1.83 m)	So	McKinley	Baton Rouge, LA
G	11	Stephanie Guihon	5 ft 6 in (1.68 m)	RS Sr	Largo	Largo, MD
C	12	Sakima Walker	6 ft 5 in (1.96 m)	So	Africentric Early College	Columbus, OH
G	14	Jailyn Mason	5 ft 9 in (1.75 m)	GS	William Mason; Arkansas	Mason, OH
G	15	Awa Sidibe	5 ft 11 in (1.8 m)	Jr	Inland Careers	Bamako, Mali
G	20	Joiya Maddox	5 ft 10 in (1.78 m)	RS So	Hoover	Hoover, AL
F	22	Tyia Singleton	6 ft 2 in (1.88 m)	RS Jr	Winter Haven	Winter Haven, FL
G	24	Kierra Sanderlin	5 ft 10 in (1.78 m)	Fr	Judson	Converse, TX
F	32	Osh Brown	6 ft 1 in (1.85 m)	GS	Chillicothe; Ball State	Chillicothe, OH
G	35	Sayawni Lassiter	5 ft 10 in (1.78 m)	GS	Newton North; Florida State	Boston, MA
F	54	Chyna Cornwell	6 ft 3 in (1.91 m)	So	Newton-Conover	Conover, NC

Head coach

- C. Vivian Stringer (Slippery Rock)

Assistant coach(es)

- Timothy Eatman (Talladega)
- Nadine Domond (Iowa)
- Michelle Edwards (Iowa)

Legend

- (C) Team captain
- (S) Suspended
- (I) Ineligible
- (W) Walk-on
- Injured
- Current redshirt

Roster
Last update: May 11, 2022

== Schedule ==
Date time, TV	Rank^{#}	Opponent^{#}	Result	Record	Site (attendance) city, state
Regular season
November 9, 2021*; 7:00 p.m.		Saint Peter's	W 59–38	1–0	Jersey Mike's Arena (1,458); Piscataway, NJ
November 12, 2021*; 7:00 p.m.		South Alabama	W 64–45	2–0	Jersey Mike's Arena (1,633); Piscataway, NJ
November 14, 2021*; 2:00 p.m.		Fairfield	W 48–42	3–0	Jersey Mike's Arena (1,288); Piscataway, NJ
November 16, 2021*; 11:00 a.m.		Stony Brook	L 44–53	3–1	Jersey Mike's Arena (1,015); Piscataway, NJ
November 19, 2021*; 7:00 p.m.		Harvard	W 68–65 ^{OT}	4–1	Jersey Mike's Arena (1,776); Piscataway, NJ
November 25, 2021*; Noon		vs. DePaul; Paradise Jam	L 74–77	4–2	Sports and Fitness Center; Saint Thomas, U.S. Virgin Islands
November 26, 2021*; 1:00 p.m.		vs. Vanderbilt; Paradise Jam	L 40–51	4–3	Sports and Fitness Center; Saint Thomas, U.S. Virgin Islands
November 27, 2021*; 1:15 p.m.		vs. No. 9 Arizona; Paradise Jam	L 44–80	4–4	Sports and Fitness Center (244); Saint Thomas, U.S. Virgin Islands
December 1, 2021*; 6:00 p.m.		at Pittsburgh; ACC–Big Ten Women's Challenge	L 50–58	4–5	Peterson Events Center (1,390); Pittsburgh, PA
December 8, 2021; 2:00 p.m., BTN		No. 8 Maryland	L 59–73	4–6 (0–1)	Jersey Mike's Arena (2,095); Piscataway, NJ
December 9, 2021; 7:00 p.m.		at Penn State	L 48–52	4–7 (0–2)	Bryce Jordan Center (1,881); University Park, PA
December 12, 2021*; 2:00 p.m.		Delaware State	W 74–36	5–7	Jersey Mike's Arena (1,232); Piscataway, NJ
December 14, 2021*; 7:00 p.m.		Central Connecticut State	W 56–45	6–7	Jersey Mike's Arena (1,192); Piscataway, NJ
December 18, 2021*; Noon		Wagner	W 73–54	7–7	Jersey Mike's Arena (1,305); Piscataway, NJ
December 30, 2021; 8:00 p.m., FS1		No. 8 Indiana	Canceled		Jersey Mike's Arena; Piscataway, NJ
January 2, 2022; 2:00 p.m.		at Purdue	L 58–60	7–8 (0–3)	Mackey Arena (3,074); West Lafayette, IN
January 6, 2022; 7:00 p.m.		Minnesota	L 49–62	7–9 (0–4)	Jersey Mike's Arena (1,001); Piscataway, NJ
January 9, 2022; Noon		at No. 8 Michigan	L 47–76	7–10 (0–5)	Crisler Center (2,154); Ann Arbor, MI
January 13, 2022; 7:00 p.m.		at Northwestern	L 63–68	7–11 (0–6)	Welsh–Ryan Arena (670); Evanston, IL
January 16, 2022; 2:00 p.m., BTN+		Wisconsin	L 45–49	7–12 (0–7)	Jersey Mike's Arena (1,581); Piscataway, NJ
January 23, 2022; 1:00 p.m., ESPN2		Ohio State	L 71–80	7–13 (0–8)	Jersey Mike's Arena (1,219); Piscataway, NJ
January 27, 2022; 7:00 p.m.		at No. 17 Maryland	L 55–72	7–14 (0–9)	Xfinity Center (3,987); College Park, MD
January 30, 2022; 2:00 p.m.		Michigan State	L 45–61	7–15 (0–10)	Jersey Mike's Arena (1,335); Piscataway, NJ
February 1, 2022; 7:00 p.m.		at Nebraska; Rescheduled from January 20	L 38–50	7–16 (0–11)	Pinnacle Bank Arena (3,503); Lincoln, NE
February 7, 2022; 6:00 p.m., BTN		at No. 23 Ohio State	L 57–61	7–17 (0–12)	Jersey Mike's Arena (3,383); Piscataway, NJ
February 13, 2022; 2:00 p.m.		Penn State	W 71–62	8–17 (1–12)	Jersey Mike's Arena (1,933); Piscataway, NJ
February 17, 2022; 7:00 p.m.		at Minnesota	W 79–61	9–17 (2–12)	Williams Arena (2,747); Minneapolis, MN
February 20, 2022; 1:00 p.m., BTN		Purdue	L 59–70	9–18 (2–13)	Jersey Mike's Arena (2,961); Piscataway, NJ
February 24, 2022 :00 p.m., BTN		No. 21 Iowa	L 78–87	9–19 (2–14)	Jersey Mike's Arena (1,852); Piscataway, NJ
February 27, 2022; 2:00 p.m., BTN		at Illinois	W 66–56	10–19 (3–14)	State Farm Center (1,445); Champaign, IL
Big Ten Women's Tournament
March 2, 2022; 2:00 p.m., BTN	(13)	vs. (12) Penn State; First Round	W 75–50	11–19	Gainbridge Fieldhouse (0); Indianapolis, IN
March 3, 2022; 2:00 p.m., BTN	(13)	vs. (5) No. 14 Indiana; Second Round	L 54–66	11–20	Gainbridge Fieldhouse (0); Indianapolis, IN
*Non-conference game. ^{#}Rankings from AP Poll. (#) Tournament seedings in parentheses. All times are in Eastern Time.

== Rankings ==
Ranking movements Legend: — = Not ranked
	Week																		
Poll	Pre	1	2	3	4	5	6	7	8	9	10	11	12	13	14	15	16	17	Final
AP	—	—	—	—	—	—	—	—	—	—	—	—	—	—	—	—	—	—	—
Coaches	—	—	—	—	—	—	—	—	—	—	—	—	—	—	—	—	—	—	—

Legend
	Increase in ranking
	Decrease in ranking
	Not ranked previous week
(RV)	Received votes
(NR)	Not ranked and did not receive votes

The Coaches Poll did not release a Week 2 poll, and the AP Poll did not release a poll after the NCAA Tournament.
