= 2021–22 Iowa Hawkeyes women's basketball team =

American college basketball season

2021–22 Iowa Hawkeyes women's basketball

Big Ten regular season co-champions Big Ten tournament champions

NCAA tournament, Second round
- Conference: Big Ten Conference

Ranking
- Coaches: No. 14
- AP: No. 8
- Record: 24–8 (14–4 Big Ten)
- Head coach: Lisa Bluder (22nd season)
- Assistant coaches: Jan Jensen; Raina Harmon; Abby Stamp
- Home arena: Carver–Hawkeye Arena

2021–22 Big Ten women's basketball standings
	Conf.				Overall
Team	W		L	PCT	W		L	PCT
No. 14 Ohio State	14	–	4	.778	25	–	7	.781
No. 8 Iowa †	14	–	4	.778	24	–	8	.750
No. 12 Michigan	13	–	4	.765	25	–	7	.781
No. 13 Maryland	13	–	4	.765	23	–	9	.719
No. 11 Indiana	11	–	5	.688	24	–	9	.727
Nebraska	11	–	7	.611	24	–	9	.727
Northwestern	8	–	8	.500	17	–	12	.586
Michigan State	8	–	9	.471	15	–	15	.500
Purdue	7	–	11	.389	17	–	15	.531
Minnesota	7	–	11	.389	15	–	18	.455
Penn State	5	–	13	.278	11	–	18	.379
Wisconsin	5	–	13	.278	8	–	21	.276
Rutgers	3	–	14	.176	11	–	20	.355
Illinois	1	–	13	.071	7	–	20	.259
† 2022 Big Ten tournament winner Rankings from AP poll

The 2021–22 Iowa Hawkeyes women's basketball team represented the University of Iowa during the 2021–22 NCAA Division I women's basketball season. The Hawkeyes were led by head coach Lisa Bluder in her twenty-second season, and played their home games at Carver–Hawkeye Arena as a member of the Big Ten Conference.

The Hawkeyes shared the Big Ten regular season title (with Ohio State) and won the 2022 Big Ten tournament to receive an automatic bid to the 2022 NCAA tournament. This 2021–22 team became the first in women’s basketball program history to win both the Big Ten regular season and tournament titles in the same year.

On Selection Sunday, Iowa was announced as the number 2 seed for the Greensboro Region, the team's fourth consecutive appearance in the NCAA tournament. The Hawkeyes were upset by 10th-seed Creighton in the second round of the NCAA tournament in a 64–62 loss. They finished the season with a record of 24–8 (14–4 B1G).

Sophomore Caitlin Clark was named Big Ten Player of the Year and a unanimous first-team All-American. Clark became the first player to lead the nation in scoring and assists in the same season.

== Previous season ==
The Hawkeyes finished the 2020–21 season with a 20–10 record, including 11–8 in Big Ten play. They received an at-large bid to the 2021 NCAA Division I women's basketball tournament, where they advanced to the Sweet Sixteen.

== Off-season ==
=== Departures ===
Name	#	Pos.	Height	Year	Hometown	Reason for departure
Alexis Sevillian	5	G	5'5"	Redshirt Senior	Goodrich, MI	Graduated; chose not to return (Note: Sevillian had one more season of eligibility but opted out.)
Megan Meyer	11	G	5'8"	Sophomore	Mason City, IA	Transferred to Drake
Lauren Jensen	15	G	5'10"	Freshman	Lakeville, MN	Transferred to Creighton
Zion Sanders	21	G	5'8"	Senior	Evansville, IN	Completed college eligibility

=== Incoming transfers ===
Name	#	Pos.	Height	Year	Hometown	Previous school
Kylie Feuerbach	4	G	6'0"	Sophomore	Sycamore, IL	Transferred from Iowa State

=== Recruits ===
College recruiting
Name	Hometown	School	Height	Weight	Commit date
Allison "AJ" Ediger; P	Hudsonville, MI	Hamilton	6 ft 3 in (1.91 m)	N/A	Jun 9, 2019
Allison "AJ" Ediger; P	Recruit ratings: ESPN: (93)				
Addison O'Grady; P	Centennial, CO	Grandview	6 ft 3 in (1.91 m)	N/A	Apr 7, 2020
Addison O'Grady; P	Recruit ratings: ESPN: (91)				
Sydney Affolter; W	Chicago, IL	Marist	5 ft 11 in (1.80 m)	N/A	Jan 26, 2020
Sydney Affolter; W	Recruit ratings: ESPN:				
Overall recruit ranking: ESPN: 22
Note: In many cases, Scout, Rivals, 247Sports, On3, and ESPN may conflict in their listings of height and weight.; In these cases, the average was taken. ESPN grades are on a 100-point scale.; Sources: "2021 Player Commits". ESPN. Archived from the original on July 28, 2020.

== Roster ==
2021–22 Iowa Hawkeyes women's basketball team
Players
Coaches

Pos.	#	Name	Height	Year	Previous school	Hometown
G	1	Tomi Taiwo	5 ft 10 in (1.78 m)	Sr	Carmel	Carmel, IN
G	3	Sydney Affolter	5 ft 11 in (1.8 m)	Fr	Marist	Chicago, IL
G	4	Kylie Feuerbach	6 ft 0 in (1.83 m)	So	Sycamore/Iowa State	Sycamore, IL
F	13	Shateah Wetering	6 ft 0 in (1.83 m)	So	Montezuma	Montezuma, IA
G/F	14	McKenna Warnock (C)	6 ft 1 in (1.85 m)	Jr	Monona Grove	Madison, WI
G	20	Kate Martin (C)	6 ft 0 in (1.83 m)	RS Jr	Edwardsville	Edwardsville, IL
G	22	Caitlin Clark	6 ft 0 in (1.83 m)	So	Dowling Catholic	West Des Moines, IA
F	23	Logan Cook	6 ft 1 in (1.85 m)	Sr	Iowa City West	Iowa City, IA
G	24	Gabbie Marshall	5 ft 9 in (1.75 m)	Jr	Mount Notre Dame	Cincinnati, OH
F/C	25	Monika Czinano (C)	6 ft 3 in (1.91 m)	Sr	Watertown-Mayer	Watertown, MN
F	34	AJ Ediger	6 ft 2 in (1.88 m)	Fr	Hamilton	Hudsonville, MI
C	40	Sharon Goodman (injured) (redshirt)	6 ft 3 in (1.91 m)	So	Crestwood	Lime Springs, IA
F/C	44	Addison O'Grady	6 ft 4 in (1.93 m)	Fr	Grandview	Aurora, CO

Head coach

- Lisa Bluder (Northern Iowa)

Assistant coach(es)

- Jan Jensen (Drake)
- Raina Harmon (Central Michigan)
- Abby Stamp (Iowa)

Legend

- (C) Team captain
- (S) Suspended
- (I) Ineligible
- (W) Walk-on
- Injured
- Current redshirt

Roster
Last update: January 29, 2022

== Schedule and results ==
Date time, TV	Rank^{#}	Opponent^{#}	Result	Record	High points	High rebounds	High assists	Site (attendance) city, state
Exhibition
November 4, 2021*; 6:30 pm	No. 9	Truman	W 102–32	–	25 – Clark	10 – Warnock	9 – Clark	Carver–Hawkeye Arena (4,754); Iowa City, IA
Regular Season
November 9, 2021*; 6:00 pm	No. 9	New Hampshire	W 93–50	1–0	26 – Clark	8 – Clark	6 – Tied	Carver–Hawkeye Arena (6,789); Iowa City, IA
November 11, 2021*; 6:30 pm	No. 9	Samford	W 91–54	2–0	20 – Czinano	6 – Tied	5 – Martin	Carver–Hawkeye Arena (4,555); Iowa City, IA
November 14, 2021*; 2:00 pm	No. 9	at Northern Iowa	W 82–61	3–0	25 – Clark	11 – Clark	7 – Clark	McLeod Center (3,095); Cedar Falls, IA
November 17, 2021*; 6:30 pm	No. 8	Southern	W 87–67	4–0	16 – Tied	11 – Warnock	10 – Clark	Carver–Hawkeye Arena (5,406); Iowa City, IA
November 21, 2021*; 2:00 pm	No. 8	Drake	Cancelled					Carver–Hawkeye Arena; Iowa City, IA
November 25, 2021*; 3:00 pm	No. 8	vs. Seton Hall; Cancun Challenge	Cancelled					Hard Rock Hotel Riviera Maya; Riviera Maya, Mexico
November 26, 2021*; 5:30 pm	No. 8	vs. USC; Cancun Challenge	Cancelled					Hard Rock Hotel Riviera Maya; Riviera Maya, Mexico
December 2, 2021*; 8:00 pm, ESPN	No. 9	at Duke; ACC–Big Ten Challenge	L 64–79	4–1	22 – Clark	9 – Clark	8 – Clark	Cameron Indoor Stadium (3,064); Durham, NC
December 5, 2021; 3:00 pm, BTN	No. 9	Michigan State	W 88–61	5–1 (1–0)	24 – Clark	10 – Clark	12 – Clark	Carver–Hawkeye Arena (6,942); Iowa City, IA
December 8, 2021*; 6:00 pm, ESPNU	No. 12	at No. 15 Iowa State	L 70–77	5–2	26 – Clark	10 – Martin	5 – Czinano	Hilton Coliseum (11,348); Ames, IA
December 18, 2021*; 6:30 pm	No. 14	UCF	W 69–61	6–2	21 – Clark	11 – Clark	7 – Warnock	Carver–Hawkeye Arena (6,236); Iowa City, IA
December 21, 2021*; 2:00 pm	No. 14	IUPUI	L 73–74	6–3	23 – Czinano	11 – Clark	4 – Clark	Carver–Hawkeye Arena (4,632); Iowa City, IA
January 2, 2022*; 11:00 am, BTN	No. 21	Evansville	W 93–56	7–3	44 – Clark	12 – O'Grady	8 – Clark	Carver–Hawkeye Arena (7,307); Iowa City, IA
January 6, 2022; 7:00 pm, BTN	No. 22	at Northwestern	L 69–77	7–4 (1–1)	30 – Clark	8 – Warnock	5 – Clark	Carver–Hawkeye Arena (5,020); Iowa City, IA
January 9, 2022; 1:00 pm, FS1	No. 22	at Nebraska	W 95–86	8–4 (2–1)	31 – Clark	10 – Warnock	12 – Clark	Pinnacle Bank Arena (8,415); Lincoln, NE
January 13, 2022; 6:00 pm		at Purdue	W 79–66	9–4 (3–1)	27 – Czinano	11 – Warnock	9 – Clark	Mackey Arena (3,103); West Lafayette, IN
January 16, 2022; 5:00 p.m., BTN		Nebraska	W 93–83	10–4 (4–1)	31 – Tied	10 – Clark	10 – Clark	Carver–Hawkeye Arena (8,473); Iowa City, IA
January 20, 2022; 7:00 pm, BTN	No. 25	at Minnesota	W 105–49	11–4 (5–1)	35 – Clark	13 – Clark	11 – Clark	Williams Arena (3,741); Minneapolis, MN
January 23, 2022; 5:00 pm, BTN	No. 25	Illinois	W 82–56	12–4 (6–1)	21 – Czinano	8 – Clark	7 – Clark	Carver–Hawkeye Arena (8,977); Iowa City, IA
January 25, 2022; 5:00 pm, BTN	No. 23	at Penn State; Rescheduled from December 30	W 107–79	13–4 (7–1)	25 – Warnock	9 – Czinano	18 – Clark	Bryce Jordan Center (1,669); University Park, PA
January 28, 2022; 7:00 pm, BTN	No. 23	at Northwestern	W 72–67 ^{OT}	14–4 (8–1)	28 – Clark	16 – Czinano	5 – Clark	Welsh-Ryan Arena (1,578); Evanston, IL
January 31, 2022; 8:00 pm, BTN	No. 21	No. 23 Ohio State	L 88–92	14–5 (8–2)	43 – Clark	9 – Czinano	7 – Clark	Carver–Hawkeye Arena (6,185); Iowa City, IA
February 3, 2022; 6:30 pm	No. 21	at Wisconsin	W 84–50	15–5 (9–2)	27 – Clark	11 – Clark	11 – Clark	Kohl Center (3,923); Madison, WI
February 6, 2022; 1:00 pm, BTN	No. 21	at No. 6 Michigan	L 90–98	15–6 (9–3)	46 – Clark	6 – Tied	10 – Clark	Crisler Center (3,827); Ann Arbor, MI
February 9, 2022; 6:30 pm	No. 25	Minnesota	W 88–78	16–6 (10–3)	32 – Clark	8 – Clark	6 – Clark	Carver–Hawkeye Arena (8,141); Iowa City, IA
February 14, 2022; 8:00 pm, ESPN2	No. 22	at No. 13 Maryland	L 69–81	16–7 (10–4)	19 – Clark	6 – Tied	6 – Clark	Carver–Hawkeye Arena (9,820); Iowa City, IA
February 19, 2022; 4:00 pm, BTN	No. 22	at No. 5 Indiana	W 96–91	17–7 (11–4)	22 – Czinano	8 – Martin	12 – Clark	Simon Skjodt Assembly Hall (7,052); Bloomington, IN
February 21, 2022; 7:00 pm, BTN	No. 21	No. 10 Indiana; Rescheduled from January 23	W 88–82	18–7 (12–4)	31 – Czinano	10 – Czinano	8 – Clark	Carver–Hawkeye Arena (7,510); Iowa City, IA
February 24, 2022; 7:00 pm, BTN	No. 21	at Rutgers	W 87–78	19–7 (13–4)	32 – Clark	9 – Clark	9 – Clark	Jersey Mike's Arena (1,852); Piscataway, NJ
February 27, 2022; 3:00 pm, ESPN2	No. 21	No. 6 Michigan	W 104–80	20–7 (14–4)	38 – Clark	6 – Clark	11 – Clark	Carver–Hawkeye Arena (15,056); Iowa City, IA
Big Ten Women's Tournament
March 4, 2022; 5:30 pm, BTN	(2) No. 12	vs. (7) Northwestern; Quarterfinals	W 72–59	21–7	21 – Czinano	12 – Clark	6 – Tied	Gainbridge Fieldhouse (–); Indianapolis, IN
March 5, 2022; 5:00 pm, BTN	(2) No. 12	vs. (6) Nebraska; Semifinals	W 83–66	22–7	41 – Clark	11 – Martin	6 – Warnock	Gainbridge Fieldhouse (–); Indianapolis, IN
March 6, 2022; 3:00 pm, ESPN2	(2) No. 12	vs. (5) No. 14 Indiana; Championship game	W 74–67	23–7	30 – Czinano	10 – Czinano	8 – Martin	Gainbridge Fieldhouse (8,709); Indianapolis, IN
NCAA tournament
March 18, 2022; 3:00 pm, ESPN	(2 G) No. 8	(15 G) Illinois State; First Round	W 98–58	24–7	27 – Clark	7 – 2 Tied	10 – Clark	Carver–Hawkeye Arena (14,382); Iowa City, IA
March 20, 2022; 12:00 pm, ABC	(2 G) No. 8	(10 G) Creighton; Second Round	L 62–64	24–8	27 – Czinano	8 – Clark	11 – Clark	Carver–Hawkeye Arena (14,382); Iowa City, IA
*Non-conference game. ^{#}Rankings from AP Poll. (#) Tournament seedings in parentheses. All times are in Central Time. Source:

== Rankings ==
Ranking movements Legend: ██ Increase in ranking ██ Decrease in ranking RV = Received votes
	Week																			
Poll	Pre	1	2	3	4	5	6	7	8	9	10	11	12	13	14	15	16	17	18	Final
AP	9	8	8	9	12	14	15	21	22	RV	25	23	21	25	22	21	12	8	8	Not released
Coaches	11	11*	11	12	13	15	15	21	21	RV	RV	24	24	24	25	22	18	11	10	14

* Coaches did not release a week 1 poll.
