= Suzy Merchant =

American basketball coach (born 1969)

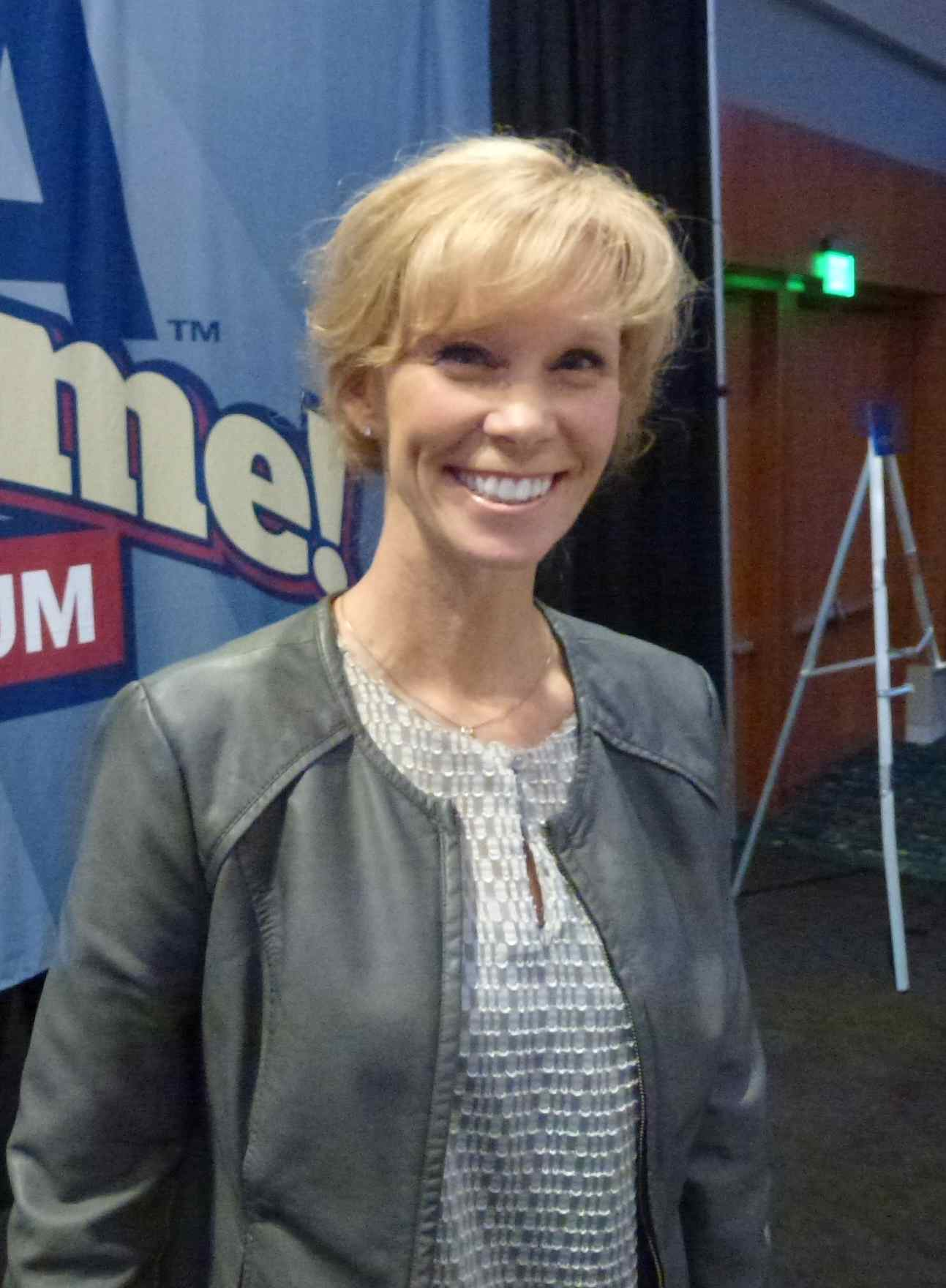

Biographical details
- Born: July 26, 1969 (age 57); Detroit, Michigan, U.S.

Playing career
- 1987–1991: Central Michigan
- Position: Guard

Coaching career (HC unless noted)
- 1992–1995: Oakland (asst.)
- 1995–1998: Saginaw Valley State
- 1998–2007: Eastern Michigan
- 2007–2023: Michigan State
- 2009: USA World Championships (asst.)

Head coaching record
- Overall: 512–293 (.642)

Accomplishments and honors

Championships
- 2× Big Ten regular season (2011, 2014)

Awards
- Big Ten Coach of the Year (2011)
Medal record
Women's basketball
Assistant Coach for United States
World University Games
Gold medal – first place	2009 Belgrade, Serbia	Team competition

Suzy Merchant (born July 26, 1969) was the head basketball coach for the Michigan State University women's basketball team from 2007 to 2023.

== Playing career ==
Merchant began playing basketball during her career at Traverse City High School. She went on to play four seasons at the guard position for Central Michigan University. She was a four-year starter and a 3-year captain.

== Coaching career ==
=== Saginaw Valley State ===
After inheriting a team with a losing record, Merchant quickly built the SVSU program into a winner, compiling a 54–29 record during her three-year tenure as head coach. During her first season, the team earned a 15–11 record before going 19–11 in the following year. The latter achievement earned the team a berth into the NCAA Division II Tournament for the second time in school history. In her final season, Saginaw Valley State collected a 20–7 record, and was ranked as high as 15th in the nation during the season.

=== Eastern Michigan ===
While at EMU, she compiled a record of 147–91 (.618), including three 20-win seasons, three postseason appearances and two Mid-American Conference West Division titles. Merchant's 2003–04 Eastern Michigan team claimed the MAC West Division and MAC Tournament championships for the first time in school history, earning the program's first-ever bid to the NCAA Tournament en route to a 22–8 record. However, Eastern Michigan stumbled in the first round against eventual sweet sixteener Boston College. She followed that impressive season by winning 23 games in 2004–05, the most in school history. However, a loss in the MAC Tournament semi-final sent EMU to the WNIT where the Eagles fell in the 1st round to eventual semi-finalist Kentucky 79–68.

In 2005–06, the Eagles reached the 20-win plateau for the third consecutive season and won their second MAC West title with a 15–1 conference record, notching the most league wins in school history. Their 22–8 overall record put them into the postseason for the third straight year as the Eagles earned a bid to the WNIT. EMU's 1st round opponent, Indiana State, defeated the Eagles 79–57. While on maternity leave for most of her final season at EMU, Merchant's Eagles finished second in the MAC West Division with a 10–6 league record and finished 16–13 overall, losing to Kent State 70–56 in the MAC conference semi-finals.

=== Michigan State ===
Merchant was named head coach at Michigan State on Monday April 30, 2007. She replaced Joanne P. McCallie who left Michigan State for the head coaching job at Duke University. In her second season, Merchant ousted McCallie's #1 seeded Duke Blue Devils in the 2009 NCAA Division I tournament. With her team's Big Ten regular-season co-championship in 2014, Merchant becomes MSU's first women's coach to capture two conference basketball titles. On March 13, 2023 she stepped down as head coach for health reasons.

== Head coaching record ==
Record table
Season	Team	Overall	Conference	Standing	Postseason
Saginaw Valley State Cardinals (GLIAC) (1995–1998)
1995–96	Saginaw Valley State	15–11	9–9	T–7th	
1996–97	Saginaw Valley State	19–11	10–8	3rd	NCAA Div II
1997–98	Saginaw Valley State	20–7	12–6	T–3rd	
Saginaw Valley State:		54–29 (.651)	31–23 (.574)		
Eastern Michigan Eagles (MAC) (1998–2007)
1998–99	Eastern Michigan	14–13	8–8	3rd	
1999–00	Eastern Michigan	16–14	8–8	T–3rd	
2000–01	Eastern Michigan	16–12	9–7	4th	
2001–02	Eastern Michigan	18–11	10–6	T–4th	
2002–03	Eastern Michigan	13–16	9–7	4th	
2003–04	Eastern Michigan	22–8	12–4	1st	NCAA First Round
2004–05	Eastern Michigan	23–8	11–5	2nd	WNIT First Round
2005–06	Eastern Michigan	22–8	15–1	1st	WNIT First Round
2006–07	Eastern Michigan	3–1*			
Eastern Michigan:		147–91 (.618)	82–46 (.641)		
Michigan State University (Big Ten) (2007–2023)
2007–08	Michigan State	23–14	10–8	T–5th	WNIT Runner-up
2008–09	Michigan State	22–11	13–5	T–2nd	NCAA Sweet Sixteen
2009–10	Michigan State	23–10	12–6	2nd	NCAA Second Round
2010–11	Michigan State	27–6	13–3	1st	NCAA Second Round
2011–12	Michigan State	20–12	11–5	T–2nd	NCAA First Round
2012–13	Michigan State	25–9	10–6	3rd	NCAA Second Round
2013–14	Michigan State	23–10	13–3	T–1st	NCAA Second Round
2014–15	Michigan State	16–15	7–11	9th	
2015–16	Michigan State	25–9	13–5	3rd	NCAA Second Round
2016–17	Michigan State	21–12	9–7	T-5th	NCAA First Round
2017–18	Michigan State	19–14	7–9	9th	WNIT Round 3
2018–19	Michigan State	21–12	9–9	7th	NCAA Second Round
2019–20	Michigan State	16–14	9–9	8th	Canceled due to COVID-19
2020–21	Michigan State	15–9	8–7	8th	NCAA First Round
2021–22	Michigan State	15–15	8–9	8th	
2022–23	Michigan State	16–14	7–10	9th	
Michigan State:		327–187 (.636)	159–112 (.587)		
Total:		528–307 (.632)			
National champion Postseason invitational champion Conference regular season champion Conference regular season and conference tournament champion Division regular season champion Division regular season and conference tournament champion Conference tournament champion

* Missed all but four games of 2006–07 while on maternity leave
** Merchant missed 7 games during 2016–17 due to a Medical Leave of Absence

== Personal life ==
Merchant is married to Gary Rakan and has two sons, Tyler Rakan and Brady Rakan.
