= 2021–22 Penn State Lady Lions basketball team =

Intercollegiate basketball season

2021–22 Penn State Lady Lions basketball
- Conference: Big Ten Conference
- Record: 11–18 (5–13 Big Ten)
- Head coach: Carolyn Kieger (3rd season)
- Assistant coach: Aaron Kallhoff
- Home arena: Bryce Jordan Center

2021–22 Big Ten women's basketball standings
	Conf.				Overall
Team	W		L	PCT	W		L	PCT
No. 14 Ohio State	14	–	4	.778	25	–	7	.781
No. 8 Iowa †	14	–	4	.778	24	–	8	.750
No. 12 Michigan	13	–	4	.765	25	–	7	.781
No. 13 Maryland	13	–	4	.765	23	–	9	.719
No. 11 Indiana	11	–	5	.688	24	–	9	.727
Nebraska	11	–	7	.611	24	–	9	.727
Northwestern	8	–	8	.500	17	–	12	.586
Michigan State	8	–	9	.471	15	–	15	.500
Purdue	7	–	11	.389	17	–	15	.531
Minnesota	7	–	11	.389	15	–	18	.455
Penn State	5	–	13	.278	11	–	18	.379
Wisconsin	5	–	13	.278	8	–	21	.276
Rutgers	3	–	14	.176	11	–	20	.355
Illinois	1	–	13	.071	7	–	20	.259
† 2022 Big Ten tournament winner Rankings from AP poll

The 2021–22 Penn State Lady Lions basketball team represented Pennsylvania State University during the 2021–22 NCAA Division I women's basketball season. The Lady Lions were led by third-year head coach Carolyn Kieger and played their home games at the Bryce Jordan Center as members of the Big Ten Conference.

They finished the season 11–18 and 5–13 in Big Ten play to finish in a tie for eleventh place. As the twelfth seed in the Big Ten tournament, they were defeated by Rutgers in the first round. They were not invited to the NCAA tournament or the WNIT.

== Previous season ==
The Lady Lions finished the season 9–15 and 6–12 in Big Ten play to finish in eleventh place. As the tenth seed in the Big Ten tournament, they were defeated by Michigan State in the second round. They were not invited to the NCAA tournament or the WNIT.

== Roster ==
2021–22 Penn State Nittany Lions women's basketball team
Players
Coaches

Pos.	#	Name	Height	Year	Previous school	Hometown
F	1	Ali Brigham	6 ft 4 in (1.93 m)	So	Franklin/George Mason	Franklin, MA
F	3	Ymke Brouwer	6 ft 0 in (1.83 m)	Fr	United School of Sports	Zürich, Switzerland
G	4	Niya Beverly	5 ft 7 in (1.7 m)	GS	St. John's College/Wisconsin	Laurel, MD
G	5	Leilani Kapinus	5 ft 10 in (1.78 m)	RS Fr	James Madison Memorial	Madison, WI
G	10	Tova Sabel	5 ft 10 in (1.78 m)	So	Bromma Gymnasium	Stockholm, Sweden
F	11	Anna Camden	6 ft 3 in (1.91 m)	Jr	Shipley	Downingtown, PA
F	12	Kayla Thomas	6 ft 3 in (1.91 m)	Fr	Emerge Christian Academy	Beltsville, MD
G	15	Maddie Burke	6 ft 0 in (1.83 m)	So	Central Bucks West	Doylestown, PA
G	20	Makenna Marisa	5 ft 11 in (1.8 m)	Jr	Peters Township	McMurry, PA
G	22	Alli Campbell	6 ft 0 in (1.83 m)	So	Bellwood-Antis/Notre Dame	Altoona, PA
G	23	Shay Hagans	5 ft 6 in (1.68 m)	Jr	Osbourn Park	Manassas, VA
G	24	Nan Garcia	6 ft 0 in (1.83 m)	Fr	Jeffersonville	Jeffersonville, IN
G	25	Kelly Jekot	6 ft 0 in (1.83 m)	GS	Cumberland Valley/Villanova	Enola, PA

Head coach

- Carolyn Kieger (Marquette)

Assistant coach(es)

- Aaron Kallhoff (Bemidji State)

Legend

- (C) Team captain
- (S) Suspended
- (I) Ineligible
- (W) Walk-on
- Injured
- Current redshirt

Roster
Last update: May 6, 2022

== Schedule and results ==
Date time, TV	Rank^{#}	Opponent^{#}	Result	Record	Site (attendance) city, state
Regular season
November 9, 2021*; 7:00 p.m., BTN+		LIU	W 85–66	1–0	Bryce Jordan Center (1,797); University Park, PA
November 11, 2021*; 7:00 p.m., BTN+		Rider	W 83–69	2–0	Bryce Jordan Center (1,839); University Park, PA
November 16, 2021*; 7:00 p.m., BTN+		Delaware State	W 120–51	3–0	Bryce Jordan Center (1,879); University Park, PA
November 21, 2021*; 2:00 p.m., ACCN		at Clemson	L 64–67	3–1	Littlejohn Coliseum (805); Clemson, SC
November 26, 2021*; 7:30 p.m., FloHoops		vs. St. John's; Gulf Coast Showcase	W 80–75	4–1	Hertz Arena (250); Estero, FL
November 27, 2021*; 7:30 p.m., FloHoops		vs. No. 13 Iowa State	L 59–93	4–2	Hertz Arena (200); Gulf Coast Showcase
November 28, 2021*; 5:00 p.m., FloHoops		vs. Kent State	L 74–81	4–3	Hertz Arena (178); Gulf Coast Showcase
December 2, 2021*; 6:00 p.m., ACCN		at Boston College; ACC–Big Ten Women's Challenge	L 69–86	4–4	Conte Forum (833); Chestnut Hill, MA
December 6, 2021; 6:00 p.m., BTN		at No. 6 Indiana	L 40–70	4–5 (0–1)	Simon Skjodt Assembly Hall (3,224); Bloomington, IN
December 9, 2021; 7:00 p.m., BTN+		Rutgers	W 52–48	5–5 (1–1)	Bryce Jordan Center (1,881); University Park, PA
December 12, 2021*; 2:00 p.m., BTN+		Youngstown State	W 78–58	6–5	Bryce Jordan Center (2,261); University Park, PA
December 18, 2021*; 2:00 p.m., ESPN+		at Duquesnse	W 68–60	7–5	UPMC Cooper Fieldhouse (1,139); Pittsburgh, PA
December 22, 2021*; Noon, BTN+		Towson	Canceled		Bryce Jordan Center; University Park, PA
January 6, 2022; 6:00 p.m., BTN		at No. 10 Maryland	L 78–106	7–6 (1–2)	Xfinity Center (4,174); College Park, MD
January 13, 2022; 8:00 p.m., BTN		No. 11 Michigan	L 57–74	7–7 (1–3)	Bryce Jordan Center (1,622); University Park, PA
January 16, 2022; 2:00 p.m., BTN+		Illinois	W 90–72	8–7 (2–3)	Bryce Jordan Center (2,048); University Park, PA
January 20, 2022; 8:00 p.m., BTN+		at Northwestern	W 63–59	9–7 (3–3)	Welsh–Ryan Arena (939); Evanston, IL
January 23, 2022; 3:00 p.m., BTN+		at Wisconsin	L 57–69	9–8 (3–4)	Kohl Center (3,189); Madison, WI
January 25, 2022; 6:00 p.m., BTN		No. 23 Iowa	L 79–107	9–9 (3–5)	Bryce Jordan Center (1,669); University Park, PA
January 27, 2022; 7:00 p.m., BTN+		Michigan State	L 58–79	9–10 (3–6)	Bryce Jordan Center (1,551); University Park, PA
January 30, 2022; 2:00 p.m., BTN+		No. 17 Maryland	L 71–82	9–11 (3–7)	Bryce Jordan Center (2,678); University Park, PA
February 3, 2022; 8:00 p.m., BTN		at Nebraska	L 61–76	9–12 (3–8)	Pinnacle Bank Arena (3,839); Lincoln, NE
February 6, 2022; 2:00 p.m., BTN+		Northwestern	L 72–78	9–13 (3–9)	Bryce Jordan Center (3,401); University Park, PA
February 9, 2022; 7:00 p.m., BTN+		at Purdue	L 77–81	9–14 (3–10)	Mackey Arena (2,902); West Lafayette, IN
February 13, 2022; 2:00 p.m., BTN+		at Rutgers	L 62–71	9–15 (3–11)	Jersey Mike's Arena (1,933); Piscataway, NJ
February 17, 2022; 7:00 p.m., BTN+		Nebraska	W 83–76	10–15 (4–11)	Bryce Jordan Center (1,801); University Park, PA
February 21, 2022; 6:00 p.m., BTN		at Michigan State	W 79–71	11–15 (5–11)	Breslin Center (2,985); East Lansing, MI
February 24, 2022; 6:00 p.m., BTN+		at No. 17 Ohio State	L 55–78	11–16 (5–12)	Value City Arena (3,618); Columbus, OH
February 27, 2022; 2:00 p.m., BTN+		Minnesota	L 83–94	11–17 (5–13)	Bryce Jordan Center (2,401); University Park, PA
Big Ten Women's Tournament
March 2, 2022; 2:00 p.m., BTN	(12)	vs. (13) Rutgers; First Round	L 50–75	11–18	Gainbridge Fieldhouse (0); Indianapolis, IN
*Non-conference game. ^{#}Rankings from AP Poll. (#) Tournament seedings in parentheses. All times are in Eastern Time.

== Rankings ==
Ranking movements Legend: — = Not ranked
	Week																		
Poll	Pre	1	2	3	4	5	6	7	8	9	10	11	12	13	14	15	16	17	Final
AP	—	—	—	—	—	—	—	—	—	—	—	—	—	—	—	—	—	—	—
Coaches	—	—	—	—	—	—	—	—	—	—	—	—	—	—	—	—	—	—	—

Legend
	Increase in ranking
	Decrease in ranking
	Not ranked previous week
(RV)	Received votes
(NR)	Not ranked and did not receive votes
т	Tied with team above or below also with this symbol

The Coaches Poll did not release a Week 2 poll, and the AP Poll did not release a poll after the NCAA Tournament.
