= 2021–22 Northwestern Wildcats women's basketball team =

Intercollegiate basketball season

2021–22 Northwestern Wildcats women's basketball
- Conference: Big Ten Conference
- Record: 17–12 (8–8 Big Ten)
- Head coach: Joe McKeown (14th season)
- Assistant coaches: Kate Popovec; Preston Reid; Tangela Smith
- Home arena: Welsh–Ryan Arena

2021–22 Big Ten women's basketball standings
	Conf.				Overall
Team	W		L	PCT	W		L	PCT
No. 14 Ohio State	14	–	4	.778	25	–	7	.781
No. 8 Iowa †	14	–	4	.778	24	–	8	.750
No. 12 Michigan	13	–	4	.765	25	–	7	.781
No. 13 Maryland	13	–	4	.765	23	–	9	.719
No. 11 Indiana	11	–	5	.688	24	–	9	.727
Nebraska	11	–	7	.611	24	–	9	.727
Northwestern	8	–	8	.500	17	–	12	.586
Michigan State	8	–	9	.471	15	–	15	.500
Purdue	7	–	11	.389	17	–	15	.531
Minnesota	7	–	11	.389	15	–	18	.455
Penn State	5	–	13	.278	11	–	18	.379
Wisconsin	5	–	13	.278	8	–	21	.276
Rutgers	3	–	14	.176	11	–	20	.355
Illinois	1	–	13	.071	7	–	20	.259
† 2022 Big Ten tournament winner Rankings from AP poll

The 2021–22 Northwestern Wildcats women's basketball team represented Northwestern University during the 2021–22 NCAA Division I women's basketball season. The Wildcats were led by 14th-year head coach Joe McKeown. They played their home games at Welsh–Ryan Arena in Evanston, Illinois as members of the Big Ten Conference.

They finished the season 17–12, 8–8 in Big Ten play, to finish in seventh place. They received a bye into the second round of the Big Ten women's tournament where they defeated Minnesota before losing to eventual champions Iowa in the quarterfinals. They were not invited to the NCAA tournament or the WNIT.

== Previous season ==
The Wildcats finished the season 16–9, 11–7 in Big Ten play, to finish in fifth place. They received a bye into the second round of the Big Ten women's tournament where they defeated Illinois and Michigan before losing to eventual champions Maryland in the semifinals. They received an at-large bid to the NCAA tournament. As the seven seed in the Alamo Regional they defeated ten seed UCF in the first round before losing to two seed Louisville in the second round to end their season.

== Roster ==
2021–22 Northwestern Wildcats women's basketball team
Players
Coaches

Pos.	#	Name	Height	Year	Previous school	Hometown
G	0	Jess Sancataldo	6 ft 0 in (1.83 m)	Sr	Turamurra	Sydney, Australia
G	1	Kaylah Rainey	5 ft 6 in (1.68 m)	Jr	Belleville East	Belleville, IL
G	2	Lauryn Satterwhite	5 ft 7 in (1.7 m)	GS	Valley Vista	Avondale, AZ
G	3	Sydney Wood	5 ft 11 in (1.8 m)	Sr	St. John's College	Olney, MD
G	4	Jillian Brown	5 ft 10 in (1.78 m)	Fr	East Grand Rapids	Grand Rapids, MI
F	10	Caileigh Walsh	6 ft 3 in (1.91 m)	Fr	Gill St. Bernard's	Sparta, NJ
G	11	Hailey Weaver	5 ft 11 in (1.8 m)	Fr	Solon	Solon, OH
G	12	Veronica Burton	5 ft 9 in (1.75 m)	Sr	Newton South	Newton, MA
F	13	Mercy Ademusayo	6 ft 4 in (1.93 m)	Fr	Linden Hall	Ode-Irele, Nigeria
F	15	Courtney Shaw	6 ft 0 in (1.83 m)	Sr	Perry Hall	Perry Hall, MD
F	20	Paige Mott	6 ft 1 in (1.85 m)	So	Abington Friends	Philadelphia, PA
G	21	Melannie Daley	5 ft 11 in (1.8 m)	Fr	Hastings	Hastings, NY
G	23	Jasmine McWilliams	5 ft 11 in (1.8 m)	So	North Central	Indianapolis, IN
G	33	Laya Hartman	5 ft 11 in (1.8 m)	Jr	Okemos	Okemos, MI
F	42	Anna Morris	6 ft 3 in (1.91 m)	So	Immaculate Heart	Mahwah, NJ

Head coach

- Joe McKeown (Mercer)

Assistant coach(es)

- Kate Popovec (Northwestern)
- Preston Reid (Ball State)
- Tangela Smith (Iowa)

Legend

- (C) Team captain
- (S) Suspended
- (I) Ineligible
- (W) Walk-on
- Injured
- Current redshirt

Roster
Last update: May 3, 2022

== Schedule and results ==
Date time, TV	Rank^{#}	Opponent^{#}	Result	Record	Site (attendance) city, state
Exhibition
November 7, 2021*; 5:00 p.m., B1G+		Parkside	W 70–58	–	Welsh–Ryan Arena (314); Evanston, IL
Regular season
November 10, 2021*; 7:00 p.m., B1G+		UIC	W 72–49	1–0	Welsh–Ryan Arena (742); Evanston, IL
November 14, 2021*; 1:00 p.m., B1G+		UCSB	W 72–46	2–0	Welsh–Ryan Arena (834); Evanston, IL
November 17, 2021*; 7:00 p.m., B1G+		Loyola	W 63–47	3–0	Welsh–Ryan Arena (931); Evanston, IL
November 21, 2021*; 5:00 p.m., FloHoops		at DePaul	L 75–78	3–1	McGrath-Phillips Arena (1,140); Chicago, IL
November 25, 2021*; 4:45 p.m., ESPN3		vs. South Dakota; Paradise Jam	W 73–57	4–1	Sports and Fitness Center (0); Saint Thomas, USVI
November 26, 2021*; 4:45 p.m., ESPN3		vs. Pittsburgh; Paradise Jam	L 60–72	4–2	Sports and Fitness Center (0); Saint Thomas, USVI
November 27, 2021*; 7:00 p.m., ESPN3		vs. No. 23 Texas A&M; Paradise Jam	L 68–77	4–3	Sports and Fitness Center (878); Saint Thomas, USVI
December 2, 2021*; 7:00 p.m., ACCN		at Clemson; ACC–Big Ten Women's Challenge	W 72–61	5–3	Littlejohn Coliseum (502); Clemson, SC
December 5, 2021; 2:00 p.m., B1G+		Wisconsin	W 61–49	6–3 (1–0)	Welsh–Ryan Arena (1,231); Evanston, IL
December 11, 2021*; 2:00 p.m., B1G+		Delaware	W 76–53	7–3	Welsh–Ryan Arena (919); Evanston, IL
December 14, 2021*; 7:00 p.m., B1G+		Milwaukee	W 55–46	8–3	Welsh–Ryan Arena (797); Evanston, IL
December 17, 2021*; 7:00 p.m., B1G+		Temple	W 68–58	9–3	Welsh–Ryan Arena (802); Evanston, IL
December 21, 2021*; 8:00 p.m., B1G		Oregon	Canceled		Welsh–Ryan Arena; Evanston, IL
December 31, 2021; 1:00 p.m., B1G		at Minnesota	Postponed to February 11		Williams Arena; Minneapolis, MN
January 3, 2022; 7:00 p.m., B1G+		Michigan State	Canceled		Welsh–Ryan Arena; Evanston, IL
January 6, 2022; 7:00 p.m., B1G		at No. 22 Iowa	W 77–69	10–3 (2–0)	Carver–Hawkeye Arena (5,020); Iowa City, IA
January 9, 2022; 2:00 p.m., B1G+		Ohio State	L 61–74	10–4 (2–1)	Welsh–Ryan Arena (1,232); Evanston, IL
January 13, 2022; 7:00 p.m., B1G+		Rutgers	W 68–63	11–4 (3–1)	Welsh–Ryan Arena (670); Evanston, IL
January 16, 2022; 1:00 p.m., B1G+		at Michigan State	L 46–65	11–5 (3–2)	Breslin Center (3,241); East Lansing, MI
January 20, 2022; 7:00 p.m., B1G+		Penn State	L 59–63	11–6 (3–3)	Welsh–Ryan Arena (939); Evanston, IL
January 23, 2022; Noon, B1G+		at No. 12 Maryland	L 59–87	11–7 (3–4)	Xfinity Center (4,940); College Park, MD
January 28, 2022; 7:00 p.m., B1G+		No. 23 Iowa	L 67–72 ^{OT}	11–8 (3–5)	Welsh–Ryan Arena (1,578); Evanston, IL
January 30, 2022; 2:00 p.m., B1G+		Illinois	Canceled		Welsh–Ryan Arena; Evanston, IL
February 4, 2022; 5:00 p.m., B1G+		at Purdue	W 80–67	12–8 (4–5)	Mackey Arena (2,862); West Lafayette, IN
February 6, 2022; 1:00 p.m., B1G+		at Penn State	W 78–72	13–8 (5–5)	Bryce Jordan Center (3,401); University Park, PA
February 11, 2022; 3:30 p.m., B1G+		at Minnesota; Rescheduled from December 31	L 68–74	13–9 (5–6)	Williams Arena (2,734); Minneapolis, MN
February 13, 2022; Noon, B1G+		No. 4 Michigan	W 71–69 ^{2OT}	14–9 (6–6)	Welsh–Ryan Arena (2,341); Evanston, IL
February 17, 2022; 5:00 p.m., B1G		at No. 5 Indiana	L 58–69	14–10 (6–7)	Simon Skjodt Assembly Hall (3,632); Bloomington, IN
February 20, 2022; 4:00 p.m., B1G		at Illinois	W 82–59	15–10 (7–7)	State Farm Center (942); Champaign, IL
February 24, 2022; 7:00 p.m., B1G+		Purdue	W 68–51	16–10 (8–7)	Welsh–Ryan Arena (1,481); Evanston, IL
February 27, 2022; 3:30 p.m., B1G		at Nebraska	L 59–73	16–11 (8–8)	Pinnacle Bank Arena (6,234); Lincoln, NE
Big Ten women's tournament
March 3, 2022; 5:30 p.m., B1G	(7)	vs. (10) Minnesota; Second round	W 65–60	17–11	Gainbridge Fieldhouse (0); Indianapolis, IN
March 4, 2022; 5:30 p.m., B1G	(7)	vs. (2) No. 12 Iowa; Quarterfinals	L 59–72	17–12	Gainbridge Fieldhouse (0); Indianapolis, IN
*Non-conference game. ^{#}Rankings from AP poll. (#) Tournament seedings in parentheses. All times are in Central.

== Rankings ==
Ranking movements Legend: ██ Increase in ranking ██ Decrease in ranking — = Not ranked RV = Received votes
	Week																		
Poll	Pre	1	2	3	4	5	6	7	8	9	10	11	12	13	14	15	16	17	Final
AP	—	—	—	—	—	—	—	—	—	—	—	—	—	—	—	—	—	—	—
Coaches	RV	—	—	—	—	—	—	—	—	—	—	—	—	—	—	—	—	—	—

Legend
	Increase in ranking
	Decrease in ranking
	Not ranked previous week
(RV)	Received votes
(NR)	Not ranked and did not receive votes
т	Tied with team above or below also with this symbol

The Coaches Poll did not release a Week 2 poll and the AP poll did not release a poll after the NCAA tournament.
