= 2022–23 Drake Bulldogs women's basketball team =

American college basketball season

2022–23 Drake Bulldogs women's basketball

MVC tournament champions

NCAA tournament, first round
- Conference: Missouri Valley Conference
- Record: 22–10 (14–6 The Valley)
- Head coach: Allison Pohlman (2nd season)
- Assistant coaches: Nicci Hays Fort; Whitney Moia; Kelli Greenway
- Home arena: Knapp Center

2022–23 Missouri Valley Conference women's basketball standings
	Conf.				Overall
Team	W		L	PCT	W		L	PCT
Illinois State	17	–	3	.850	24	–	9	.727
Belmont	17	–	3	.850	23	–	12	.657
Northern Iowa	16	–	4	.800	23	–	10	.697
Missouri State	14	–	6	.700	20	–	12	.625
Drake†	14	–	6	.700	22	–	9	.710
UIC	9	–	11	.450	19	–	17	.528
Southern Illinois	8	–	12	.400	12	–	19	.387
Murray State	7	–	13	.350	15	–	16	.484
Evansville	6	–	14	.300	11	–	19	.367
Indiana State	6	–	14	.300	11	–	19	.367
Valparaiso	5	–	15	.250	7	–	23	.233
Bradley	1	–	19	.050	4	–	28	.125
† 2023 MVC tournament winner As of March 19, 2023

The 2022–23 Drake Bulldogs women's basketball team represented Drake University during the 2022–23 NCAA Division I women's basketball season. The Bulldogs, led by second-year head coach Allison Pohlman, played their home games at Knapp Center in Des Moines, Iowa as members of the Missouri Valley Conference (MVC).

The Bulldogs finished the season 22–10, 14–6 in MVC play, to finish in a tie for fourth place. In the MVC tournament, they defeated Missouri State in the quarterfinals, upset top-seeded Illinois State in the semifinals and Belmont to win the MVC tournament championship and earn the conference's automatic bid into the NCAA tournament. They received the #12 seed in the Seattle Regional 4, where they lost to #5 region seed Louisville in the first round.

== Previous season ==
The Bulldogs finished the 2021–22 season 20–14, 9–9 in MVC play, to finished in a tie for sixth place. As a 7th seed in the MVC women's tournament they defeated Bradley in the first round before losing to Missouri State in the quarterfinals. They received an invitation to the WNIT where they defeated Missouri in the first round and fellow MVC member Northern Iowa in the second round before losing to South Dakota State in the third round.

== Roster ==
2022–23 Drake Bulldogs women's basketball team
Players
Coaches

Pos.	#	Name	Height	Year	Previous school	Hometown
G	1	Hannah Nilges	5 ft 7 in (1.7 m)	So	Jefferson City	Jefferson City, MO
G	3	Taylor McAulay	5 ft 11 in (1.8 m)	RS Jr	Centennial	Lino Lakes, MN
G	10	Katie Dinnebier	5 ft 8 in (1.73 m)	So	Waukee	West Des Moines, IA
G	11	Megan Meyer	5 ft 8 in (1.73 m)	Sr	Mason City	Mason City, IA
F	12	Ashley Iiams	6 ft 1 in (1.85 m)	So	Ames	Ames, IA
F	14	Anna Miller	6 ft 3 in (1.91 m)	So	Rochester Mayo	Rochester, MN
G	21	Ava Hawthorne	5 ft 9 in (1.75 m)	Fr	Gilbert	Ames, IA
F	30	Taedyn Gray	6 ft 2 in (1.88 m)	Fr	Shawnee Mission West	Lenexa, KS
F	32	Courtney Becker	6 ft 0 in (1.83 m)	Jr	La Cross Aquinas	Fountain City, WI
G	34	Sarah Beth Gueldner	5 ft 9 in (1.75 m)	Sr	Olathe Northwest	Olathe, KS
F	42	Maggie Bair	6 ft 3 in (1.91 m)	Sr	Glenbard South	Glen Ellyn, IL
F	43	Grace Berg	6 ft 0 in (1.83 m)	RS Sr	Indianola; Missouri	Indianola, IA

Head coach

- Allison Pohlman (Northern Iowa)

Assistant coach(es)

- Nicci Hays Fort (Loyola (MD))
- Whitney Moia (MidAmerica Nazarene)
- Kelli Greenway (Iowa)

Legend

- (C) Team captain
- (S) Suspended
- (I) Ineligible
- (W) Walk-on
- Injured
- Current redshirt

Roster
Last update: March 13, 2025

== Schedule ==
Date time, TV	Rank^{#}	Opponent^{#}	Result	Record	Site (attendance) city, state
Exhibition
October 30, 2022*; 2:00 p.m.		Northwest Missouri State	W 84–41		Knapp Center (1,820); Des Moines, IA
December 18, 2022*; 2:00 p.m.		Southwest Baptist	W 96–40		Knapp Center (1,549); Des Moines, IA
Non-conference regular season
November 7, 2022*; 6:00 p.m., ESPN3		Green Bay	W 80–67	1–0	Knapp Center (1,814); Des Moines, IA
November 13, 2022*; 2:00 p.m., MC22/ESPN+		No. 4 Iowa	L 86–92 ^{OT}	1–1	Knapp Center (6,424); Des Moines, IA
November 19, 2022*; 2:00 p.m., ESPN+		No. 22 Nebraska	W 80–62	2–1	Knapp Center (2,487); Des Moines, IA
November 25, 2022*; 1:00 p.m.		vs. Massachusetts; FIU Thanksgiving Classic semifinals	L 83–100 ^{OT}	2–2	Ocean Bank Convocation Center (175); Miami, FL
November 26, 2022*; 10:00 a.m.		vs. Howard; FIU Thanksgiving Classic consolation	W 97–60	3–2	Ocean Bank Convocation Center (183); Miami, FL
December 1, 2022*; 11:00 a.m., ESPN+		Lindenwood	W 87–60	4–2	Knapp Center (4,971); Des Moines, IA
December 6, 2022*; 7:00 p.m., MidcoSN+		at South Dakota	W 83–54	5–2	Sanford Coyote Sports Center (1,588); Vermillion, SD
December 10, 2022*; 7:00 p.m., FloSports		at No. 18 Creighton	L 71–75	5–3	D. J. Sokol Arena (1,083); Omaha, NE
December 22, 2022*; 5:00 p.m., ESPN+		at No. 14 Iowa State	Canceled due to severe weather		Hilton Coliseum; Ames, IA
MVC regular season
December 30, 2022; 6:30 p.m., ESPN3		at Illinois State	L 76–87	5–4 (0–1)	Redbird Arena (1,132); Normal, IL
January 1, 2023; 2:00 p.m., ESPN+		at Bradley	W 87–58	6–4 (1–1)	Renaissance Coliseum (398); Peoria, IL
January 6, 2023; 6:00 p.m., ESPN+		Belmont	W 94–63	7–4 (2–1)	Knapp Center (1,978); Des Moines, IA
January 8, 2023; 2:00 p.m., MC22/ESPN+		Murray State	W 80–67	8–4 (3–1)	Knapp Center (2,189); Des Moines, IA
January 11, 2023; 6:00 p.m., MC22/ESPN+		Northern Iowa	L 69–70	8–5 (3–2)	Knapp Center (2,563); Des Moines, IA
January 14, 2023; 12:00 p.m., ESPN3		at Indiana State	W 86–65	9–5 (4–2)	Hulman Center (1,487); Terre Haute, IN
January 19, 2023; 6:00 p.m., ESPN+		UIC	W 63–51	10–5 (5–2)	Knapp Center (1,801); Des Moines, IA
January 21, 2023; 2:00 p.m., ESPN3		Valparaiso	W 84–51	11–5 (6–2)	Knapp Center (2,130); Des Moines, IA
January 26, 2023; 6:00 p.m., ESPN+		at Southern Illinois	W 87–73	12–5 (7–2)	Banterra Center (488); Carbondale, IL
January 28, 2023; 1:00 p.m., ESPN+		at Missouri State	L 54–64	12–6 (7–3)	Great Southern Bank Arena (2,174); Springfield, MO
February 1, 2023; 6:00 p.m., ESPN+		at Northern Iowa	L 47–49	12–7 (7–4)	McLeod Center (2,757); Cedar Falls, IA
February 4, 2023; 2:00 p.m., ESPN3		Evansville	W 87–48	13–7 (8–4)	Knapp Center (2,655); Des Moines, IA
February 10, 2023; 6:00 p.m., ESPN3		at Valparaiso	W 71–54	14–7 (9–4)	Athletics–Recreation Center (2,655); Valparaiso, IN
February 12, 2023; 1:00 p.m., ESPN+		at UIC	L 52–54	14–8 (9–5)	Credit Union 1 Arena (1,098); Chicago, IL
February 16, 2023; 6:00 p.m., ESPN+		Bradley	W 81–49	15–8 (10–5)	Knapp Center (1,719); Des Moines, IA
February 18, 2023; 2:00 p.m., MC22/ESPN3		Illinois State	W 83–67	16–8 (11–5)	Knapp Center (2,623); Des Moines, IA
February 23, 2023; 6:00 p.m., ESPN+		at Murray State	W 97–71	17–8 (12–5)	CFSB Center (1,298); Murray, KY
February 25, 2023; 4:00 p.m., ESPN3		at Belmont	L 77–83	17–9 (12–6)	Curb Event Center (1,198); Nashville, TN
March 2, 2023; 6:00 p.m., ESPN3		Missouri State	W 83–63	18–9 (13–6)	Knapp Center (2,173); Des Moines, IA
March 4, 2023; 2:00 p.m., ESPN3		Southern Illinois	W 91–68	19–9 (14–6)	Knapp Center (2,345); Des Moines, IA
MVC women's tournament
March 10, 2023; 2:30 p.m., ESPN+	(4)	vs. (5) Missouri State; Quarterfinals	W 73–70	20–9	Vibrant Arena at The MARK (1,241); Moline, IL
March 11, 2023; 1:30 p.m., ESPN+	(4)	vs. (1) Illinois State; Semifinals	W 74–54	21–9	Vibrant Arena at The MARK; Moline, IL
March 12, 2023; 1:00 p.m., ESPNU	(4)	vs. (2) Belmont; Championship	W 89–71	22–9	Vibrant Arena at The MARK (1,208); Moline, IL
NCAA women's tournament
March 18, 2023*; 6:30 p.m., ESPN2	(10 G)	vs. (5 S4) Louisville; First round	L 81–83	22–10	Moody Center; Austin, TX
*Non-conference game. ^{#}Rankings from AP poll. (#) Tournament seedings in parentheses. S4=Seattle 4. All times are in Central.

== Rankings ==
Ranking movements Legend: ██ Increase in ranking ██ Decrease in ranking — = Not ranked RV = Received votes
	Week																				
Poll	Pre	1	2	3	4	5	6	7	8	9	10	11	12	13	14	15	16	17	18	19	Final
AP	—	—*	—	RV	—	—	—	—	—	—	—	—	—	—	—	—	—	—	—	RV	Not released
Coaches	—	—*	—^	RV	—	—	—	—	—	—	—	—	—	—	—	—	—	—	—	—	

*The preseason and week 1 polls were the same.
^Coaches did not release a week 2 poll.

== See also ==
- 2022–23 Drake Bulldogs men's basketball team
