= Missouri Valley Conference women's basketball tournament =

- Conference basketball championship
- Sport: College basketball
- Conference: Missouri Valley Conference
- Number of teams: 10
- Format: Single-elimination tournament
- Current stadium: Ford Center
- Current location: Evansville, Indiana
- Played: 1983, 1987–1992 (as Gateway Collegiate Athletic Conference tournament); 1993–present (as MVC Tournament)
- Last contest: 2025
- Current champion: Murray State
- Most championships: Missouri State Lady Bears (11)
- Official website: MVC-Sports.com Women's Basketball

The Missouri Valley Conference women's basketball tournament, currently promoted as Hoops in the Heartland, is an annual basketball tournament which features the women's basketball teams of each of the Missouri Valley Conference member universities. The tournament determines which MVC team receives an automatic bid to the NCAA Division I women's basketball tournament.

First held at the end of the 1982–83 basketball season, the tournament was originally conducted by the Gateway Collegiate Athletic Conference, a women's sports conference formed in that school year by six MVC members plus four members of what is now known as the Summit League. In 1985, the Gateway took on football as its only men's sport. Following the 1991–92 school year, the MVC absorbed the women's side of the Gateway (which by that time had eight MVC members) and spun off its football side into what is now the Missouri Valley Football Conference. The MVC maintains all historic records of Gateway women's sports.

== Tournament champions by year ==
Year	Champion	Score	Runner-up	Tournament MVP	Location
1983	Illinois State	62–54	Southern Illinois	None Selected	Horton Field House • Normal, Illinois
1984	Not Held				
1985	Not Held				
1986	Not Held				
1987	Southern Illinois	53–51	Eastern Illinois	None Selected	SIU Arena • Carbondale, Illinois
1988	Eastern Illinois	80–79	Illinois State	None Selected	Horton Field House • Normal, Illinois
1989	Illinois State	70–53	Southern Illinois	None Selected	Horton Field House • Normal, Illinois
1990	Southern Illinois	71–54	Illinois State	Amy Rakers, Southern Illinois	SIU Arena • Carbondale, Illinois
1991	Southwest Missouri State (Note: Became Missouri State effective with the 2005–06 school year.)	74–61	Southern Illinois	None Selected	Hammons Student Center • Springfield, Missouri
1992	Southwest Missouri State	86–69	Southern Illinois	None Selected	Hammons Student Center • Springfield, Missouri
1993	Southwest Missouri State	54–53	Southern Illinois	None Selected	Hammons Student Center • Springfield, Missouri
1994	Southwest Missouri State	88–71	Creighton	Tina Robbins, Southwest Missouri State	Hammons Student Center • Springfield, Missouri
1995	Drake	71–68 (OT)	Southwest Missouri State	Tricia Wakely, Drake	Hammons Student Center • Springfield, Missouri
1996	Southwest Missouri State	59–56	Illinois State	LaTanya Davis, Southwest Missouri State	Redbird Arena • Normal, Illinois
1997	Drake	78–59	Wichita State	Keisha Cox, Drake	Hammons Student Center • Springfield, Missouri
1998	Drake	73–59	Southwest Missouri State	Tammi Blackstone, Drake	Hammons Student Center • Springfield, Missouri
1999	Evansville	75–72 (OT)	Creighton	Shyla McKibbon, Evansville	Redbird Arena • Normal, Illinois
2000	Drake	70–67	Southwest Missouri State	Jackie Stiles, Southwest Missouri State	Hammons Student Center • Springfield, Missouri
2001	Southwest Missouri State	84–69	Drake	Jackie Stiles, Southwest Missouri State	Hammons Student Center • Springfield, Missouri
2002	Creighton	77–74	Drake	Christy Neneman, Creighton	Hammons Student Center • Springfield, Missouri
2003	Southwest Missouri State	64–55	Indiana State	Kari Koch, Southwest Missouri State	Knapp Center • Des Moines, Iowa
2004	Southwest Missouri State	74–67	Drake	Jenni Lingor, Missouri State	Hammons Student Center • Springfield, Missouri
2005	Illinois State	72–70	Indiana State	Jaci McCormack, Illinois State	Redbird Arena • Normal, Illinois
2006	Missouri State	64–55	Indiana State	Kari Koch, Missouri State	Hammons Student Center • Springfield, Missouri
2007	Drake	65–64 (OT)	Creighton	Lindsay Whorton, Drake	Knapp Center • Des Moines, Iowa
2008	Illinois State	70–62	Drake	Kristi Cirone, Illinois State	Family Arena • St. Charles, Missouri
2009	Evansville	47–45	Creighton	Ashley Austin, Evansville	Family Arena • St. Charles, Missouri
2010	Northern Iowa	54–53	Creighton	Lizzie Boeck, Northern Iowa	Family Arena • St. Charles, Missouri
2011	Northern Iowa	69–41	Missouri State	Jacqui Kalin, Northern Iowa	Family Arena • St. Charles, Missouri
2012	Creighton	53–38	Drake	Carli Tritz, Creighton	Family Arena • St. Charles, Missouri
2013	Wichita State	69–65	Illinois State	Alex Harden, Wichita State	Family Arena • St. Charles, Missouri
2014	Wichita State	73-49	Drake	Alex Harden, Wichita State	Family Arena • St. Charles, Missouri
2015	Wichita State	85–71	Missouri State	Alex Harden, Wichita State	Family Arena • St. Charles, Missouri
2016	Missouri State	73–49	Northern Iowa	Tyonna Snow, Missouri State	iWireless Center • Moline, Illinois
2017	Drake	74–69 (OT)	Northern Iowa	Caitlin Ingle, Drake	iWireless Center • Moline, Illinois
2018	Drake	75–63	Northern Iowa	Maddy Dean, Drake	iWireless Center • Moline, Illinois
2019	Missouri State	94–79	Drake	Alexa Willard, Missouri State	iWireless Center • Moline, Illinois
2020	Canceled due to COVID-19				
2021	Bradley	78-70	Drake	Gabi Haack, Bradley	TaxSlayer Center • Moline, Illinois
2022	Illinois State	50–48	Northern Iowa	JuJu Redmond, Illinois State	TaxSlayer Center • Moline, Illinois
2023	Drake	89–71	Belmont	Maggie Bair, Drake	Vibrant Arena at The MARK • Moline, Illinois
2024	Drake	76–75	Missouri State	Katie Dinnebier, Drake	Vibrant Arena at The MARK • Moline, Illinois
2025	Murray State	83–62	Belmont	Katelyn Young, Murray State	Ford Center • Evansville, Indiana
2026	Murray State	91-70	Evansville	Halli Poock, Murray State	Xtream Arena • Coralville, Iowa
2027					Enterprise Center • St. Louis, Missouri

== Tournament championships by school ==
School	Championships	Last Won
Missouri State	11	2019
Drake	9	2024
Illinois State	5	2022
Wichita State	3	2015
Murray State	2	2026
Creighton	2	2012
Northern Iowa	2	2011
Evansville	2	2009
Southern Illinois	2	1990
Bradley	1	2021
Eastern Illinois	1	1988

- Schools highlighted in pink are former members of the MVC
- Belmont, Indiana State, UIC, and Valparaiso have never won the MVC Tournament.

== See also ==
- Missouri Valley Conference men's basketball tournament
