= Missouri Valley Conference Tournament =

Missouri Valley Conference Championship or Missouri Valley Conference Tournament may refer to:

- Missouri Valley Conference men's basketball tournament, the men's basketball championship tournament
- Missouri Valley Conference women's basketball tournament, the women's basketball championship tournament
