= 2021–22 Illinois State Redbirds women's basketball team =

Intercollegiate basketball season

2021–22 Illinois State Redbirds women's basketball

Missouri Valley Tournament Champions

NCAA tournament, first round
- Conference: Missouri Valley Conference
- Record: 19–14 (12–6 Missouri Valley Conference)
- Head coach: Kristen Gillespie (5th season)
- Assistant coaches: Jessica Keller (5th season); Scott Gillespie (5th season); Mariyah Brawner-Henley (4th season)
- Home arena: Redbird Arena

2021–22 Missouri Valley Conference women's basketball standings
	Conf.				Overall
Team	W		L	PCT	W		L	PCT
Southern Illinois	15	–	3	.833	21	–	10	.677
Missouri State	14	–	4	.778	25	–	8	.758
Northern Iowa	13	–	5	.722	23	–	11	.676
Illinois State †	12	–	6	.667	19	–	14	.576
Loyola Chicago	10	–	8	.556	18	–	12	.600
Valparaiso	9	–	9	.500	11	–	19	.367
Drake	9	–	9	.500	20	–	14	.588
Indiana State	5	–	13	.278	11	–	20	.355
Evansville	2	–	16	.111	8	–	22	.267
Bradley	1	–	17	.056	4	–	24	.143
† 2022 MVC tournament winner

The 2021–22 Illinois State Redbirds women's basketball team represented Illinois State University during the 2021–22 NCAA Division I women's basketball season. The Redbirds, led by fifth-year head coach Kristen Gillespie, played their home games at the Redbird Arena as members of the Missouri Valley Conference.

They finished the season with a 19–14 overall record, 12–6 in conference play to finish in fourth place. As the fourth seed in the Missouri Valley Tournament, they earned a bye into the quarterfinals and defeated Loyola–Chicago, Southern Illinois, and Northern Iowa to win the championship. They received an automatic bid to the NCAA tournament, where they were the fifteenth seed in the Greensboro Region. They lost to second seed Iowa in the first round to end their season.

== Previous season ==
The Redbirds finished the season with a 16–9 overall record, 12–6 in Missouri Valley play to finish in third place. As the third seed in the Missouri Valley Tournament, they earned a bye into the quarterfinals, where they lost to Loyola–Chicago. They received an at-large bid to the WNIT, where they lost to Tulane in the First Round, defeated Samford in the consolation semifinal and lost to UT Martin in the consolation final.

== Roster ==
2021–22 Illinois State Redbirds women's basketball team
Players
Coaches

Pos.	#	Name	Height	Year	Previous school	Hometown
G	0	Jada Stinson	5 ft 8 in (1.73 m)	GS	Elizabethtown; Arkansas State	Fayetteville, NC
F	1	Jasmine McGinnis-Taylor	6 ft 3 in (1.91 m)	So	Westside	Omaha, NE
G	3	Mary Crompton	5 ft 8 in (1.73 m)	RS Jr	Regina	Iowa City, IA
G	4	Lauren Cohen	5 ft 8 in (1.73 m)	Fr	Glenbard South	Wheaton, IL
F	5	Lexy Koudelka	6 ft 2 in (1.88 m)	Sr	Nevada	Nevada, IA
G	11	Kenzie Bowers	5 ft 9 in (1.75 m)	Fr	Kent City	Kent City, MI
G	12	Maya Wong	5 ft 8 in (1.73 m)	RS So	Normal Community	Normal, IL
G	13	Kayel Newland	5 ft 10 in (1.78 m)	Sr	Liberty	Kansas City, MO
F	22	Chloe van Zeeland	6 ft 1 in (1.85 m)	Fr	Kaukauna	Kaukauna, WI
G	23	Juliunn Redmond	5 ft 11 in (1.8 m)	GS	John Marshall; Tallahassee CC	Chicago, IL
F	24	Deanna Wilson	6 ft 2 in (1.88 m)	Jr	Cardinal Ritter; Moberly Area CC	St. Louis, MO
F/C	25	Lexi Boles	6 ft 3 in (1.91 m)	Fr	Dowling Catholic	Des Moines, IA
F	32	Kate Bullman	6 ft 2 in (1.88 m)	So	Grayslake Central	Grayslake, IL
F	33	Hannah Kelle	6 ft 1 in (1.85 m)	Jr	Lincoln Southwest	Lincoln, NE

Head coach

- Kristen Gillespie (NC State)

Assistant coach(es)

- Jessica Keller (Quincy)
- Scott Gillespie (Ripon)
- Mariyah Brawner-Henley (Lewis)

Legend

- (C) Team captain
- (S) Suspended
- (I) Ineligible
- (W) Walk-on
- Injured
- Current redshirt

Roster
Last update: May 17, 2022

== Schedule ==
Date time, TV	Rank^{#}	Opponent^{#}	Result	Record	Site (attendance) city, state
Exhibition
November 3, 2021*; 6:00 p.m.		UMSL	W 64–53	–	Redbird Arena (363); Normal, IL
Non-conference regular season
November 9, 2021*; 6:00 p.m., ESPN+		at Northern Illinois	L 60–77	0–1	NIU Convocation Center (432); DeKalb, IL
November 13, 2021*; 1:00 p.m.		at St. Thomas	W 70–55	1–1	Schoenecker Arena (400); Saint Paul, MN
November 17, 2021*; 6:00 p.m., ESPN+		Purdue	L 64–76	1–2	Redbird Arena (672); Normal, IL
November 20, 2021*; 2:00 p.m., ESPN+		at UT Martin	L 52–54	1–3	Skyhawk Arena (1,131); Martin, TN
November 26, 2021*; 4:30 p.m., ESPN+		at UC Irvine; UCI Thanksgiving Classic	L 55–67	1–4	Bren Events Center (277); Irvine, CA
November 27, 2021*; 4:30 p.m.		vs. Sacramento State; UCI Thanksgiving Classic	L 63–65	1–5	Bren Events Center (186); Irvine, CA
December 1, 2021*; 11:00 a.m., ESPN3		Missouri Baptist	W 91–42	2–5	Redbird Arena (1,549); Normal, IL
December 5, 2021*; 2:00 p.m., ESPN+		Dayton	L 67–78	2–6	Redbird Arena (568); Normal, IL
December 11, 2021*; 1:00 p.m., ESPN+		at SIUE	W 80–71	3–6	Vadalabene Center (150); Edwardsville, IL
December 16, 2021*; 6:30 p.m., BTN+		at Wisconsin	L 60–70	3–7	Kohl Center (2,150); Madison, WI
December 20, 2021*; 1:00 p.m., ESPN3		Saint Louis	W 77–66	4–7	Redbird Arena (366); Normal, IL
Missouri Valley regular season
January 1, 2022; 2:00 p.m., ESPN3		Bradley	W 64–57	5–7 (1–0)	Redbird Arena (312); Normal, IL
January 7, 2022; 5:00 p.m., ESPN+		at Indiana State	W 66–58	6–7 (2–0)	Hulman Center (1,112); Terre Haute, IN
January 9, 2022; 1:00 p.m., ESPN+		at Evansville	W 87–68	7–7 (3–0)	Meeks Family Fieldhouse (222); Evansville, IN
January 13, 2022; 6:00 p.m., ESPN+		Valparaiso	W 65–49	8–7 (4–0)	Redbird Arena (316); Normal, IL
January 15, 2022; 6:00 p.m., ESPN3		Loyola–Chicago	W 68–50	9–7 (5–0)	Redbird Arena (703); Normal, IL
January 20, 2022; 6:00 p.m., ESPN+		at Southern Illinois	L 47–56	9–8 (5–1)	SIU Arena (317); Carbondale, IL
January 22, 2022; 2:00 p.m., ESPN+		at Missouri State	W 52–51	10–8 (6–1)	JQH Arena (2,036); Springfield, MO
January 27, 2022; 6:00 p.m., ESPN+		Northern Iowa	L 67–74	10–9 (6–2)	Redbird Arena (824); Normal, IL
January 29, 2022; 6:00 p.m., ESPN+		Drake	W 70–58	11–9 (7–2)	Redbird Arena (1,480); Normal, IL
February 4, 2022; 7:00 p.m., ESPN+		Evansville	W 75–60	12–9 (8–2)	Redbird Arena (504); Normal, IL
February 6, 2022; 2:00 p.m., ESPN+		Indiana State	W 72–64	13–9 (9–2)	Redbird Arena (656); Normal, IL
February 10, 2022; 7:00 p.m., ESPN+		at Loyola–Chicago	W 57–53	14–9 (10–2)	Joseph J. Gentile Arena (327); Chicago, IL
February 12, 2022; 1:00 p.m., ESPN3		at Valparaiso	W 85–80	15–9 (11–2)	Athletics–Recreation Center (388); Valparaiso, IN
February 18, 2022; 6:00 p.m., ESPN+		Missouri State	L 67–75	15–10 (11–3)	Redbird Arena (735); Normal, IL
February 20, 2022; 2:00 p.m., ESPN+		Southern Illinois	L 49–65	15–11 (11–4)	Redbird Arena (1,039); Normal, IL
February 25, 2022; 6:00 p.m., ESPN+		at Drake	L 62–104	15–12 (11–5)	Knapp Center (2,261); Des Moines, IA
February 27, 2022; 2:00 p.m., ESPN+		at Northern Iowa	L 63–70	15–13 (11–6)	McLeod Center (1,333); Cedar Falls, IA
March 5, 2022; 2:00 p.m., ESPN+		at Bradley	W 62–53	16–13 (12–6)	Renaissance Coliseum (626); Peoria, IL
Missouri Valley Tournament
March 11, 2022; 2:30 p.m., ESPN+	(4)	vs. (5) Loyola–Chicago; Quarterfinals	W 68–52	17–13	TaxSlayer Center (0); Moline, IL
March 12, 2022; 1:30 p.m., ESPN+	(4)	vs. (1) Southern Illinois; Semifinals	W 50–42	18–13	TaxSlayer Center (0); Moline, IL
March 13, 2022; 1:00 p.m., ESPN+	(4)	vs. (3) Northern Iowa; Final	W 50–48	19–13	TaxSlayer Center (1,392); Moline, IL
NCAA tournament
March 18, 2022; 3:00 p.m., ESPN	(15 G)	at (2 G) No. 8 Iowa; First Round	L 58–98	19–14	Carver–Hawkeye Arena (14,382); Iowa City, IA
*Non-conference game. ^{#}Rankings from AP Poll. (#) Tournament seedings in parentheses. G=Greensboro. All times are in Central Time.

== Rankings ==
Ranking movements Legend: — = Not ranked
	Week																		
Poll	Pre	1	2	3	4	5	6	7	8	9	10	11	12	13	14	15	16	17	Final
AP	—	—	—	—	—	—	—	—	—	—	—	—	—	—	—	—	—	—	—
Coaches	—	—	—	—	—	—	—	—	—	—	—	—	—	—	—	—	—	—	—

Legend
	Increase in ranking
	Decrease in ranking
	Not ranked previous week
(RV)	Received votes
(NR)	Not ranked and did not receive votes

The Coaches Poll did not release a Week 2 poll, and the AP Poll did not release a poll after the NCAA Tournament.
