= Kristen Gillespie =

American college basketball coach

Current position
- Title: Head coach
- Team: Illinois State Redbirds
- Conference: Missouri Valley
- Record: 180–109 (.623)

Biographical details
- Education: North Carolina State University

Head coaching record
- Overall: 180–109 (.623)

Accomplishments and honors

Championships
- Missouri Valley tournament (2022); Missouri Valley regular season (2023)

Kristen Gillespie is an American college basketball coach who is currently the head coach of the Illinois State Redbirds women's basketball team. She was previously the head coach of the women's basketball teams at Lewis University and Benedictine University. She played basketball for North Carolina State University between 1996 and 1999.

== Career ==
Gillespie was born in Illinois; her father Mike and grandfather Gordie were both sports coaches. She moved to Florida when her father began coaching the Tallahassee Community College men's basketball team. Gillespie played high school basketball for Maclay School in Tallahassee, where she was named an All-American. She began her college basketball career at Auburn in 1994 but transferred to North Carolina State after her freshman year. In her junior year at NC State, she started at point guard for a squad that made the Final Four of the 1998 NCAA Division I women's basketball tournament.

Gillespie began her basketball coaching career as an assistant coach at UCF, followed by a stint as assistant coach at UC Santa Barbara. She then served as a graduate assistant at North Carolina State, the head coach at Maclay School, and an assistant coach at UIC. In 2011, she became the head coach of the Benedictine University women's basketball team, which she led for four years. Division II Lewis University hired her to coach their women's basketball team in 2015.

Gillespie was hired to be the head coach at Illinois State in 2017. In 2021, she led the team to the Women's National Invitation Tournament (WNIT), its first postseason appearance of any kind since 2013. The next year, the team made the NCAA Division I women's basketball tournament for the first time since 2008; it lost to Iowa in the first round. Illinois State returned to the WNIT in every season from 2023 to 2026.

== Personal life ==
Gillespie and her wife Brittany have two children.

== Head coaching record ==
Record table
Season	Team	Overall	Conference	Standing	Postseason
Illinois State (Missouri Valley Conference) (2017–present)
2017–18	Illinois State	14–16	8–10	6th	
2018–19	Illinois State	19–12	11–7	4th	
2019–20	Illinois State	19–10	11–7	4th	
2020–21	Illinois State	15–9	11–6	3rd	WNIT 1st Round
2021–22	Illinois State	19–14	12–6	4th	NCAA 1st Round
2022–23	Illinois State	24–9	17–3	1st	WNIT 1st Round
2023–24	Illinois State	22–12	13–7	5th	WNIT Super 16
2024–25	Illinois State	24–13	14–6	5th	WNIT Semifinals
2025–26	Illinois State	24–14	13–7	3rd	WNIT Championship Game
Illinois State:		180–109 (.623)			
Total:		180–109 (.623)			
National champion Postseason invitational champion Conference regular season champion Conference regular season and conference tournament champion Division regular season champion Division regular season and conference tournament champion Conference tournament champion
