= 2021–22 Mount St. Mary's Mountaineers women's basketball team =

American college basketball season

2021–22 Mount St. Mary's Mountaineers women's basketball
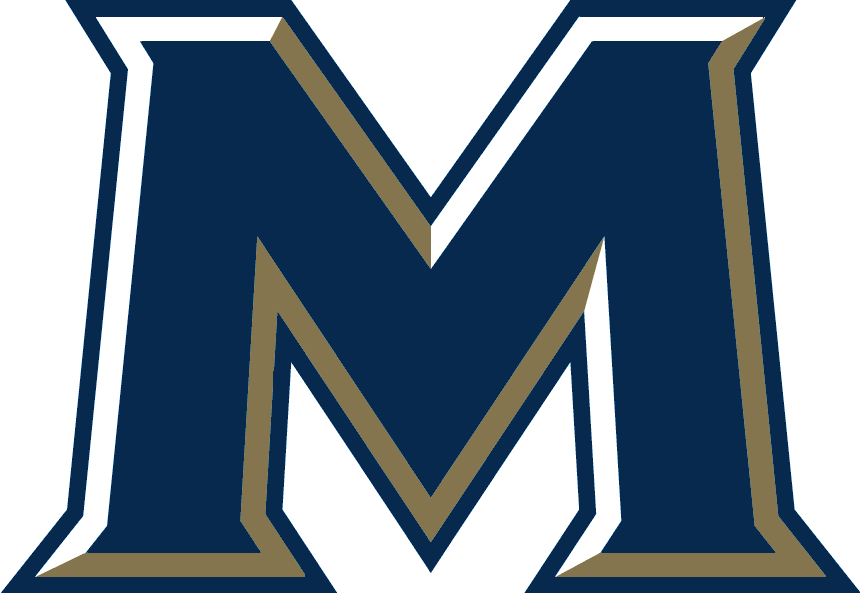

NEC tournament champions

NCAA tournament, First Four
- Conference: Northeast Conference
- Record: 16–13 (11–7 NEC)
- Head coach: Antoine White (1st season)
- Associate head coach: Julie Kaufman
- Assistant coaches: Kelsey Funderburgh; Dave Scarborough
- Home arena: Knott Arena

2021–22 Northeast Conference women's basketball standings
	Conf.				Overall
Team	W		L	PCT	W		L	PCT
Fairleigh Dickinson	15	–	3	.833	19	–	12	.613
St. Francis Brooklyn	13	–	5	.722	17	–	10	.630
Mount St. Mary's †	11	–	7	.611	16	–	13	.552
Wagner	10	–	8	.556	17	–	12	.586
LIU	9	–	9	.500	9	–	18	.333
Saint Francis (PA)	8	–	10	.444	8	–	22	.267
Merrimack*	7	–	11	.389	9	–	17	.346
Bryant	6	–	12	.333	10	–	22	.313
Sacred Heart	6	–	12	.333	8	–	17	.320
Central Connecticut	5	–	13	.278	6	–	20	.231
† 2022 NEC tournament winner * ineligible for the 2022 NCAA tournament due to transition period

The 2021–22 Mount St. Mary's Mountaineers women's basketball team represented Mount St. Mary's University in the 2021–22 NCAA Division I women's basketball season. The Mountaineers, led by first-year head coach Antoine White, played their home games at Knott Arena in Emmitsburg, Maryland as members of the Northeast Conference (NEC).

On May 2, 2022, it was announced that the Mountaineers would join the Metro Atlantic Athletic Conference (MAAC) on July 1, 2022, leaving the NEC, of which they had been members since 1989.

They finished the season 16–13 overall, and 11–7 in NEC play, to finish in third place. As the third seed in the NEC tournament, they received a bye into the quarterfinals, where they defeated St. Francis (PA). In the semifinals they defeated fourth seed Wagner to reach the finals, where they defeated seventh seed Bryant to earn the tournament title. The title was the fifth in program history, and second in a row. They received an automatic bid to the NCAA tournament as tournament champions. They were seeded as one of the sixteen seeds in the Bridgeport Region. They played a First Four matchup with Longwood, which they lost to end their season.

== Previous season ==
The Mountaineers finished the 2020–21 season 17–7 overall, and 14–4 in NEC play, to finish in first place, and win the regular-season championship. As the first seed in the NEC tournament, they defeated Fairleigh Dickinson in the semifinals and Wagner in the Final to earn the tournament title. Their title was the fourth in program history. They received an automatic bid to the NCAA tournament as tournament champions. They were seeded as one of the sixteen seeds in the HemisFair Regional. They lost in the first round to second seed Maryland to end their season.

== Roster ==
2021–22 Mount St. Mary's Mountaineers women's basketball team
Players
Coaches

Pos.	#	Name	Height	Year	Previous school	Hometown
F	00	Isabella Hunt	5 ft 11 in (1.8 m)	So	Bishop McCort	Johnstown, PA
C	2	Tess Borgosz	6 ft 4 in (1.93 m)	GS	Depew	Buffalo, NY
G/F	3	Kendall Bresee	5 ft 10 in (1.78 m)	GS	Urbana	Frederick, MD
F	5	Abby Bailey	6 ft 2 in (1.88 m)	Fr	New Hope	Laurel, MD
G	10	Michaela Harrison	5 ft 7 in (1.7 m)	Sr	Lake Ridge	Cleveland, OH
G	11	Jada Lee	5 ft 5 in (1.65 m)	So	Carlynton	Pittsburgh, PA
G	13	Aryna Taylor	5 ft 10 in (1.78 m)	RS Jr	Patrick Henry	Ashland, VA
G	14	Jessica Tomasetti	5 ft 5 in (1.65 m)	So	Our Lady of Good Counsel	North Potomac, MD
G	15	Jasmine Lindsay-Huskey	5 ft 10 in (1.78 m)	Fr	St. John's Catholic Prep	Middletown, MD
F	20	Jaedyn Jamison	6 ft 1 in (1.85 m)	Fr	Franklin County	Rocky Mount, VA
G	21	Kayla Agentowicz	5 ft 9 in (1.75 m)	GS	Lakeland Jr./Sr.	Scott Township, PA
F	22	Maddie McCrea	6 ft 1 in (1.85 m)	Fr	Allentown	Allentown, NJ
F	33	Isabella Pelaia	6 ft 0 in (1.83 m)	So	Mars	Mars, PA

Head coach

- Antoine White (Southern Vermont)

Assistant coach(es)

- Julie Kaufman (Catawba)
- Kelsey Funderburgh (Walsh University)
- Dave Scarborough (Cal U)

Legend

- (C) Team captain
- (S) Suspended
- (I) Ineligible
- (W) Walk-on
- Injured
- Current redshirt

Roster
Last update: June 3, 2022

== Schedule and results ==
NEC COVID-19 policy provided that if a team could not play a conference game due to COVID-19 issues within its program, the game would be declared a forfeit and the other team would receive a conference win. However, wins related to COVID-19 did not count, pursuant to NCAA policy.

Date time, TV	Rank^{#}	Opponent^{#}	Result	Record	Site (attendance) city, state
Non-conference regular season
November 9, 2021*; 7:00 p.m.		at Seton Hall	L 68–81	0–1	Walsh Gymnasium (581); South Orange, NJ
November 13, 2021*; 1:00 p.m.		Valley Forge	W 102–15	1–1	Knott Arena (1,022); Emmitsburg, MD
November 16, 2021*; 7 p.m., BTN+		at No. 3 Maryland	L 57–98	1–2	Xfinity Center (3,683); College Park, MD
November 19, 2021*; 5:00 p.m.		at Lehigh	L 72–91	1–3	Stabler Arena (509); Bethlehem, PA
November 23, 2021*; 6:00 p.m.		Howard	L 49–56	1–4	Knott Arena (643); Emmitsburg, MD
November 28, 2021*; 2:00 p.m., ACCNX		at Clemson	L 59–83	1–5	Littlejohn Coliseum (436); Clemson, SC
December 4, 2021*; 5:00 p.m.		at Loyola	L 55–56	1–6	Reitz Arena; Baltimore, MD
December 7, 2021*; 7:00 p.m.		at No. 20 Ohio State	L 50–94	1–7	Value City Arena (2,805); Columbus, OH
December 18, 2021*; 1:00 p.m.		Maryland Eastern Shore	W 82–65	2–7	Knott Arena (532); Emmitsburg, MD
December 21, 2021*; 1:00 p.m.		UMBC	Cancelled		Knott Arena; Emmitsburg, MD
NEC regular season
December 29, 2021; 7:00 p.m.		at Fairleigh Dickinson	L 0–1 (forfeit)	2–7 (0–1)	Rothman Center; Hackensack, NJ
December 31, 2021; 11:30 a.m., ESPN3		at Wagner	L 0–1 (forfeit)	2–7 (0–2)	Spiro Sports Center; Staten Island, NY
January 6, 2022; 7:00 p.m.		LIU	W 70–54	3–7 (1–2)	Knott Arena (238); Emmitsburg, MD
January 8, 2022; 1:00 p.m.		St. Francis Brooklyn	L 59–62	3–8 (1–3)	Knott Arena (263); Emmitsburg, MD
January 15, 2022; 1:00 p.m.		Bryant	W 68–52	4–8 (2–3)	Knott Arena (378); Emmitsburg, MD
January 17, 2022; 2:00 p.m.		Merrimack	W 78–70	5–8 (3–3)	Knott Arena (253); Emmitsburg, MD
January 21, 2022; 7:00 p.m.		at Sacred Heart	W 60–51	6–8 (4–3)	Pitt Center (453); Fairfield, CT
January 23, 2022; 1:00 p.m.		at Central Connecticut	W 71–60	7–8 (5–3)	Detrick Gymnasium (133); New Britain, CT
January 27, 2022; 5:00 p.m., ESPNU		Fairleigh Dickinson	L 56–64	7–9 (5–4)	Knott Arena (1,017); Emmitsburg, MD
January 29, 2022; 2:00 p.m.		Saint Francis (PA)	L 58–70	7–10 (5–5)	Knott Arena (1,177); Emmitsburg, MD
February 3, 2022; 7:00 p.m.		at Merrimack	W 68–58	8–10 (6–5)	Hammel Court (637); North Andover, MA
February 5, 2022; 1:00 p.m.		at Bryant	W 68–52	9–10 (7–5)	Chace Athletic Center (170); Smithfield, RI
February 10, 2022; 7:00 p.m.		Wagner	W 53–51	10–10 (8–5)	Knott Arena (597); Emmitsburg, MD
February 17, 2022; 7:00 p.m.		at St. Francis Brooklyn	L 53–58	10–11 (8–6)	Pope Athletic Complex (51); Brooklyn, NY
February 19, 2022; 2:00 p.m.		at LIU	L 46–60	10–12 (8–7)	Steinberg Wellness Center (302); Brooklyn, NY
February 24, 2022; 7:00 p.m.		Sacred Heart	W 63–40	11–12 (9–7)	Knott Arena (425); Emmitsburg, MD
February 26, 2022; 1:00 p.m.		Central Connecticut	W 64–47	12–12 (10–7)	Knott Arena (471); Emmitsburg, MD
March 3, 2022; 7:00 p.m.		at Saint Francis (PA)	W 61–48	13–12 (11–7)	DeGol Arena (477); Loretto, PA
NEC tournament
March 7, 2022; 7:00 p.m., NEC Front Row	(3)	(6) Saint Francis (PA); Quarterfinals	W 69–53	14–12	Knott Arena (1,032); Emmitsburg, MD
March 10, 2022; 7:00 p.m., NEC Front Row	(3)	(4) Wagner; Semifinals	W 62–50	15–12	Knott Arena (1,532); Emmitsburg, MD
March 13, 2022; Noon, ESPNU	(3)	(7) Bryant; Final	W 60–42	16–12	Knott Arena (2,272); Emmitsburg, MD
NCAA tournament
March 17, 2022; 7:00 p.m., ESPN2	(16 B)	(16 B) Longwood; First Four	L 70–74	16–13	Reynolds Coliseum (648); Raleigh, NC
*Non-conference game. ^{#}Rankings from AP poll. (#) Tournament seedings in parentheses. B=Bridgeport. All times are in Eastern.

== Rankings ==
Ranking movements Legend: — = Not ranked
	Week																		
Poll	Pre	1	2	3	4	5	6	7	8	9	10	11	12	13	14	15	16	17	Final
AP	—	—	—	—	—	—	—	—	—	—	—	—	—	—	—	—	—	—	—
Coaches	—	—	—	—	—	—	—	—	—	—	—	—	—	—	—	—	—	—	—

Legend
	Increase in ranking
	Decrease in ranking
	Not ranked previous week
(RV)	Received votes
(NR)	Not ranked and did not receive votes

The Coaches Poll did not release a Week 2 poll, and the AP poll did not release a poll after the NCAA tournament.
