= 2022 MEAC women's basketball tournament =

- Classification: Division I
- Season: 2021–22
- Teams: 8
- Site: Norfolk Scope; Norfolk, Virginia
- Television: ESPN+,

The 2022 MEAC women's basketball tournament was the postseason women's basketball tournament for the 2021–22 season in the Mid-Eastern Athletic Conference (MEAC). The tournament took place March 9–12, 2022. The tournament winner received an automatic invitation to the 2022 NCAA Division I women's basketball tournament.

2021–22 MEAC women's basketball standings
	Conf.				Overall
Team	W		L	PCT	W		L	PCT
Howard †	11	–	3	.786	21	–	10	.677
Norfolk State	11	–	3	.786	17	–	12	.586
Morgan State	11	–	3	.786	18	–	8	.692
Coppin State	9	–	5	.643	15	–	13	.536
Maryland Eastern Shore	7	–	7	.500	12	–	16	.429
South Carolina State	4	–	10	.286	4	–	25	.138
North Carolina Central	3	–	11	.214	5	–	20	.200
Delaware State	0	–	14	.000	0	–	24	.000
† 2022 MEAC tournament winner

== Seeds ==
All eligible teams are seeded by record within the conference, with a tiebreaker system to seed teams with identical conference records.

Seed	School	Conference	Tiebreaker 1	Tiebreaker 2	Tiebreaker 3	Tiebreaker 4
1	Howard	11-3	2-2 vs. Morgan State/Norfolk State	2-0 vs. Coppin State		
2	Norfolk State	11-3	2-2 vs. Howard/Morgan State	1-1 vs. Coppin State	8-0 vs. UM-ES, SC ST, NCCU, DSU	Superior scoring margin vs. conference opponents over Morgan State
3	Morgan State	11-3	2-2 vs. Howard/Norfolk State	1-1 vs. Coppin State	8-0 vs. UM-ES, SC ST, NCCU, DSU	Inferior scoring margin vs. conference opponents compared to Norfolk State
4	Coppin State	9-5				
5	Maryland Eastern Shore	7–7				
6	South Carolina State	4-10				
7	North Carolina Central	3-11				
8	Delaware State	0–14				

== Schedule ==
Game	Time*	Matchup^{#}	Score	Television
Quarterfinals – Wednesday, March 9, 2022
1	Noon	No. 1 Howard vs. No. 8 Delaware State	87–51	ESPN+
2	2:00pm	No. 2 Norfolk State vs. No. 7 NC Central	58–52	ESPN+
Quarterfinals – Thursday, March 10, 2022
3	Noon	No. 4 Coppin State vs. No. 5 Maryland Eastern Shore	65-73	ESPN+
4	2:00pm	No. 3 Morgan State vs. No. 6 South Carolina State	66-53	ESPN+
Semifinals – Friday, March 11, 2022
5	Noon	No. 1 Howard vs. No. 5 Maryland Eastern Shore	68-54	ESPN+
6	2:00pm	No. 2 Norfolk State vs. No. 3 Morgan State	53-51	ESPN+
Championship – Saturday, March 12, 2022
7	4:00pm	No. 1 Howard vs. No. 2 Norfolk State	61–44	ESPN+
*Game times in EST. #-Rankings denote tournament seeding.

== Bracket ==
Quarterfinals; March 9–10; ESPN+
1	Howard	87
8	Delaware State	51
4	Coppin State	65
5	Maryland Eastern Shore	73
2	Norfolk State	58
7	North Carolina Central	52
3	Morgan State	66
6	South Carolina State	53

Semifinals; March 11; ESPN+
1	Howard	68
5	Maryland Eastern Shore	54
2	Norfolk State	53
3	Morgan State	51

Championship; March 12; ESPN+
1	Howard	61
2	Norfolk State	44
