= 2021–22 Montana State Bobcats women's basketball team =

Intercollegiate basketball season

2021–22 Montana State Bobcats women's basketball
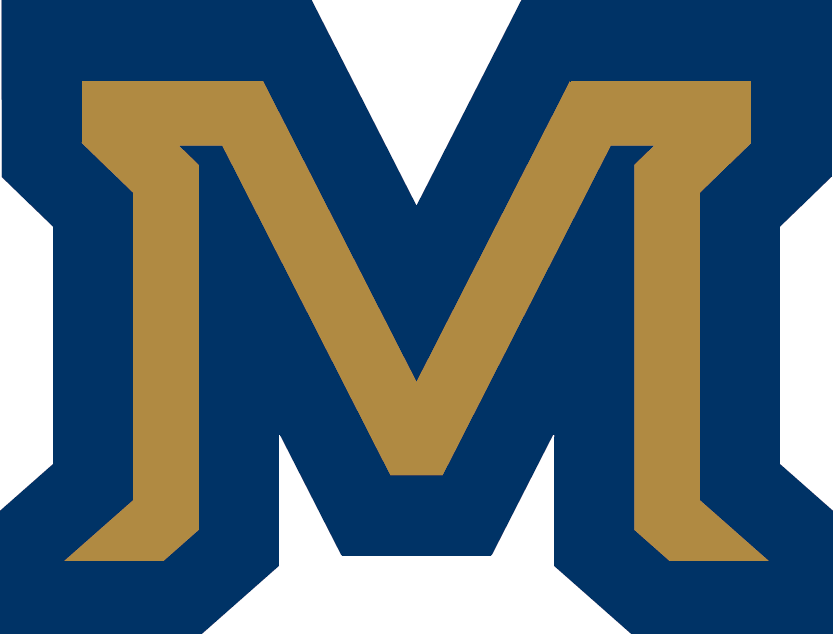

Big Sky tournament champions

NCAA tournament, first round
- Conference: Big Sky Conference
- Record: 22–13 (14–6 Big Sky)
- Head coach: Tricia Binford (17th season)
- Assistant coaches: Sunny Smallwood; Blaire Braxton; Katie Bussey
- Home arena: Brick Breeden Fieldhouse

2021–22 Big Sky women's basketball standings
	Conf.				Overall
Team	W		L	PCT	W		L	PCT
Idaho State	15	–	5	.750	19	–	12	.613
Montana State †	14	–	6	.700	22	–	13	.629
Southern Utah	14	–	6	.700	18	–	12	.600
Northern Arizona	12	–	8	.600	17	–	14	.548
Montana	12	–	8	.600	19	–	11	.633
Idaho	11	–	9	.550	14	–	18	.438
Sacramento State	10	–	10	.500	14	–	16	.467
Northern Colorado	9	–	11	.450	15	–	16	.484
Eastern Washington	7	–	13	.350	9	–	21	.300
Weber State	6	–	14	.300	11	–	20	.355
Portland State	0	–	20	.000	5	–	24	.172
† Big Sky tournament winner

The 2021–22 Montana State Bobcats women's basketball team represented Montana State University during the 2021–22 NCAA Division I women's basketball season. The Bobcats, led by seventeenth-year head coach Tricia Binford, played their home games at Brick Breeden Fieldhouse and were members of the Big Sky Conference.

They finished the season 22–13, 14–6 in Big Sky play to finish in a tie for second place. As the second seed in the Big Sky tournament, they earned a bye into the quarterfinals, where they defeated Weber State. They defeated Idaho in the semifinals and Northern Arizona in the finals to win the tournament for the third time in team history. They received an automatic bid to the NCAA tournament and were the sixteen seed in the Spokane Regional. They were defeated in the first round by one seed Stanford to end their season.

== Previous season ==
The Bobcats finished the season 17–7, 13–3 in Big Sky play to finish in third place. As the third seed in the Big Sky tournament, they earned a bye into the Quarterfinals where they defeated Sacramento State before losing to Idaho in the semifinals. They were not invited to the NCAA tournament or the WNIT.

== Roster ==
2021–22 Montana State Bobcats women's basketball team
Players
Coaches

Pos.	#	Name	Height	Year	Previous school	Hometown
G	0	Darian White	5 ft 6 in (1.68 m)	Jr	Mountain View	Boise, ID
F	1	Mia Hughes	5 ft 10 in (1.78 m)	Fr	Woodinville	Woodinville, WA
G	3	Ashley Van Sickle	5 ft 7 in (1.7 m)	Sr	Ralston Valley	Arvada, CO
G	5	Ava Ranson	5 ft 10 in (1.78 m)	So	Timberline	Boise, ID
F	10	Kola Bad Bear	6 ft 2 in (1.88 m)	Jr	Billings Senior	Billings, MT
F	11	Katelynn Limardo	6 ft 2 in (1.88 m)	So	Silver	Silver City, NM
G	15	Leia Beattie	5 ft 9 in (1.75 m)	So	Midland Classical Academy	Midland, TX
G	20	Madison Jackson	5 ft 9 in (1.75 m)	Jr	Parma	Parma, ID
F	21	Lexi Deden	6 ft 1 in (1.85 m)	So	Sentinel	Missoula, MT
F	23	Gabby Mocchi	6 ft 1 in (1.85 m)	Sr	Champlin Park	Champlin, MN
F/C	24	Taylor Janssen	6 ft 3 in (1.91 m)	So	Rosemount	Rosemount, MN
F	30	Kenzie Stumne	5 ft 11 in (1.8 m)	RS So	Forest Lake	Forest Lake, MN
C	33	Lindsey Hein	6 ft 6 in (1.98 m)	Fr	Forsyth	Forsyth, MT

Head coach

- Tricia Binford (Boise State)

Assistant coach(es)

- Sunny Smallwood (Boise State)
- Blaire Braxton (Montana State)
- Katie Bussey (Montana State)

Legend

- (C) Team captain
- (S) Suspended
- (I) Ineligible
- (W) Walk-on
- Injured
- Current redshirt

Roster
Last update: June 1, 2022

== Schedule ==
Date time, TV	Rank^{#}	Opponent^{#}	Result	Record	Site (attendance) city, state
Exhibition
November 6, 2021*; 5:00 p.m.		South Dakota Mines	W 94–43	–	Brick Breeden Fieldhouse; Bozeman, MT
Regular season
November 9, 2021*; Noon, ESPN+		Carroll College	W 69–60	1–0	Brick Breeden Fieldhouse (2,802); Bozeman, MT
November 11, 2021*; 7:00 p.m.		at Gonzaga	L 47–72	1–1	McCarthey Athletic Center (3,301); Spokane, WA
November 13, 2021*; 2:00 p.m.		at UNLV	L 42–80	1–2	Thomas & Mack Center (423); Las Vegas, NV
November 18, 2021*; 5:00 p.m., ESPN+		at South Dakota State	L 49–78	1–3	Frost Arena (1,262); Brookings, SD
November 20, 2021*; 1:00 p.m.		at North Dakota	L 85–89	1–4	Sioux Center (1,323); Grand Forks, ND
November 26, 2021*; 3:30 p.m.		vs. North Texas; Holiday Beach Classic	L 78–87	1–5	Mott Athletics Center (323); San Luis Obispo, CA
November 27, 2021*; 3:30 p.m., ESPN+		at Cal Poly; Holiday Beach Classic	W 67–55	2–5	Mott Athletics Center (341); San Luis Obispo, CA
December 2, 2021; 7:00 p.m., ESPN+		Northern Colorado	W 63–57	3–5 (1–0)	Brick Breeden Fieldhouse (1,223); Bozeman, MT
December 4, 2021; 7:00 p.m., ESPN+		Sacramento State	W 76–69	4–5 (2–0)	Brick Breeden Fieldhouse (1,338); Bozeman, MT
December 9, 2021*; 7:00 p.m., ESPN+		MSU-Billings	W 82–81 ^{2OT}	5–5	Brick Breeden Fieldhouse (1,196); Bozeman, MT
December 11, 2021*; 2:00 p.m., ESPN+		Utah Valley	W 67–58	6–5	Brick Breeden Fieldhouse (1,178); Bozeman, MT
December 18, 2021*; 3:00 p.m.		Seattle	W 76–49	7–5	Brick Breeden Fieldhouse (372); Bozeman, MT
December 21, 2021*; 7:00 p.m., ESPN+		No. 19 BYU	L 67–89	7–6	Brick Breeden Fieldhouse (1,362); Bozeman, MT
December 30, 2021; 6:00 p.m., ESPN+		at Weber State	L 63–68	7–7 (2–1)	Dee Events Center (212); Ogden, UT
January 1, 2022; 2:00 p.m., ESPN+		at Idaho State	L 57–67	7–8 (2–2)	Reed Gym (910); Pocatello, ID
January 17, 2022; 7:00 p.m., ESPN+		Idaho	W 79–69	8–8 (3–2)	Brick Breeden Fieldhouse (1,083); Bozeman, MT
January 20, 2022; 7:00 p.m., ESPN+		Northern Arizona	W 88–73	9–8 (4–2)	Brick Breeden Fieldhouse (1,189); Bozeman, MT
January 22, 2022; 2:00 p.m., ESPN+		Portland State	W 71–56	10–8 (5–2)	Brick Breeden Fieldhouse (1,622); Bozeman, MT
January 24, 2022; 7:00 p.m., ESPN+		Montana	W 73–59	11–8 (6–2)	Brick Breeden Fieldhouse (2,324); Bozeman, MT
January 27, 2022; 7:00 p.m., ESPN+		at Eastern Washington	W 65–55	12–8 (7–2)	Reese Court (232); Cheney, WA
February 3, 2022; 7:00 p.m., ESPN+		Idaho State	W 73–68	13–8 (8–2)	Brick Breeden Fieldhouse (1,207); Bozeman, MT
February 5, 2022; 2:00 p.m., ESPN+		Weber State	W 74–71	14–8 (9–2)	Brick Breeden Fieldhouse (1,567); Bozeman, MT
February 7, 2022; 7:00 p.m., ESPN+		at Idaho	W 96–84	15–8 (10–2)	Cowan Spectrum (1,161); Moscow, ID
February 10, 2022; 6:30 p.m., ESPN+		at Southern Utah	L 60–70	15–9 (10–3)	America First Events Center (397); Cedar City, UT
February 12, 2022; Noon, ESPN+		at Northern Arizona	W 83–77	16–9 (11–3)	Walkup Skydome (356); Flagstaff, AZ
February 17, 2022; 7:00 p.m., ESPN+		Eastern Washington	L 69–76	16–10 (11–4)	Brick Breeden Fieldhouse (1,515); Bozeman, MT
February 19, 2022; 2:00 p.m., ESPN+		Southern Utah	W 65–47	17–10 (12–4)	Brick Breeden Fieldhouse (1,876); Bozeman, MT
February 21, 2022; 7:00 p.m., ESPN+		at Portland State	W 82–57	18–10 (13–4)	Viking Pavilion (364); Portland, OR
February 26, 2022; 7:00 p.m., ESPN+		at Montana	L 57–71	18–11 (13–5)	Dahlberg Arena (4,059); Missoula, MT
March 2, 2022; 8:00 p.m., ESPN+		at Sacramento State	W 65–52	19–11 (14–5)	Hornets Nest (207); Sacramento, CA
March 4, 2022; 6:00 p.m., ESPN+		at Northern Colorado	L 63–71	19–12 (14–6)	Bank of Colorado Arena (946); Greeley, CO
Big Sky tournament
March 8, 2022; 5:30 p.m., ESPN+	(2)	vs. (10) Weber State; Quarterfinals	W 81–60	20–12	Idaho Central Arena (1,387); Boise, ID
March 9, 2022; 8:00 p.m., ESPN+	(2)	vs. (6) Idaho; Semifinals	W 73–67	21–12	Idaho Central Arena (0); Boise, ID
March 11, 2022; 1:00 p.m., ESPN+	(2)	vs. (4) Northern Arizona; Final	W 75–64	22–12	Idaho Central Arena (956); Boise, ID
NCAA tournament
March 18, 2022; 8:00 p.m., ESPN2	(16 S)	at (1 S) No. 2 Stanford; First Round	L 37–78	22–13	Maples Pavilion (3,648); Stanford, CA
*Non-conference game. ^{#}Rankings from AP Poll. (#) Tournament seedings in parentheses. S=Spokane. All times are in Mountain Time.

== Rankings ==
Ranking movements Legend: — = Not ranked
	Week																		
Poll	Pre	1	2	3	4	5	6	7	8	9	10	11	12	13	14	15	16	17	Final
AP	—	—	—	—	—	—	—	—	—	—	—	—	—	—	—	—	—	—	—
Coaches	—	—	—	—	—	—	—	—	—	—	—	—	—	—	—	—	—	—	—

Legend
	Increase in ranking
	Decrease in ranking
	Not ranked previous week
(RV)	Received votes
(NR)	Not ranked and did not receive votes

The Coaches Poll did not release a Week 2 poll, and the AP Poll did not release a poll after the NCAA Tournament.
