= 2022 NCAA Division I women's basketball tournament =

American women's collegiate basketball tournament

- Season: 2021–22
- Teams: 68
- Finals site: Target Center, Minneapolis, Minnesota
- Champions: South Carolina Gamecocks (2nd title, 2nd title game, 4th Final Four)
- Runner-up: UConn Huskies (12th title game, 22nd Final Four)
- Semifinalists: Louisville Cardinals (4th Final Four); Stanford Cardinal (15th Final Four)
- Winning coach: Dawn Staley (2nd title)
- MOP: Aliyah Boston (South Carolina)

The 2022 NCAA Division I women's basketball tournament was a single-elimination tournament of 68 teams to determine the National Collegiate Athletic Association (NCAA) Division I college basketball national champion for the 2021–22 NCAA Division I women's basketball season. The 40th edition of the tournament began on March 16, 2022, and concluded with the championship game on April 3 at Target Center in Minneapolis, where the South Carolina Gamecocks defeated the UConn Huskies 64–49 to win their second NCAA title, and handing UConn its first loss in the championship game. This tournament marked the introduction of the "First Four" round and an expansion of the field of participants from 64 teams to 68, mirroring the men's tournament since 2011.

Big South champion Longwood, Horizon champion IUPUI and Southland champion Incarnate Word made their tournament debuts. Tennessee continued its record streak of making every edition of the tournament, while UConn extended its record streak of 14 consecutive Final Four appearances.

== Tournament procedure ==
For the first time, the women's tournament was expanded from 64 to 68 teams, adopting the format that has been used by the men's tournament since 2011; these teams consisted of the 32 conference champions, and 36 "at-large" bids that were extended by the NCAA Selection Committee. The last four at-large teams and the teams seeded 65 through 68 overall competed in First Four games, whose winners advanced to the 64-team first round.

The top four teams outside of the ranking (commonly known as the "first four out") were designated as standbys in the event a school was forced to withdraw before the start of the tournament due to COVID-19 protocols. Once the tournament began, teams that withdrew would not be replaced, and the affected team's opponent would automatically advance to the next round by walkover.

First four out
NET	School	Conference	Record
48	Boston College	ACC	19–11
50	Missouri	SEC	18–12
36	South Dakota State	Summit	22–9
41	UCLA	Pac-12	14–12

== Schedule and venues ==
2022 Subregionals – Fri/Sun (pink) and Sat/Mon (green)
2022 NCAA Regionals (blue) and Final Four (red)

After the 2020 tournament was cancelled and the 2021 tournament was held in a single location due to the COVID-19 pandemic, it was reverted to the standard format for the first time since 2019.

The first two rounds, also referred to as the subregionals, were played at the sites of the top 16 seeds, as was done from 2016 to 2019.

First Four

- March 16 and 17
  - Four of the campuses seeded in the Top 16.

Subregionals (first and second rounds)

- March 18 and 20 (Fri/Sun)
  - Colonial Life Arena, Columbia, South Carolina (Host: University of South Carolina)
  - James Hilton Coliseum, Ames, Iowa (Host: Iowa State University)
  - Carver-Hawkeye Arena, Iowa City, Iowa (Host: University of Iowa)
  - KFC Yum! Center, Louisville, Kentucky (Host: University of Louisville)
  - Ferrell Center, Waco, Texas (Host: Baylor University)
  - Maples Pavilion, Stanford, California (Host: Stanford University)
  - XFINITY Center, College Park, Maryland (Host: University of Maryland)
  - Frank Erwin Center, Austin, Texas (Host: University of Texas)
- March 19 and 21 (Sat/Mon)
  - McKale Center, Tucson, Arizona (Host: University of Arizona)
  - Thompson-Boling Arena, Knoxville, Tennessee (Host: University of Tennessee)
  - Crisler Center, Ann Arbor, Michigan (Host: University of Michigan)
  - Pete Maravich Assembly Center, Baton Rouge, Louisiana (Host: Louisiana State University)
  - Reynolds Coliseum, Raleigh, North Carolina (Host: North Carolina State University)
  - Lloyd Noble Center, Norman, Oklahoma (Host: University of Oklahoma)
  - Simon Skjodt Assembly Hall, Bloomington, Indiana (Host: Indiana University)
  - Harry A. Gampel Pavilion, Storrs, Connecticut (Host: University of Connecticut)

Regional semifinals and finals (Sweet Sixteen and Elite Eight)

- March 25–28
  - Bridgeport regional, Total Mortgage Arena, Bridgeport, Connecticut (cohosts: University of Connecticut, Fairfield University)
  - Greensboro regional, Greensboro Coliseum Complex, Greensboro, North Carolina (host: Atlantic Coast Conference)
  - Wichita regional, Intrust Bank Arena, Wichita, Kansas (host: Wichita State University)
  - Spokane regional, Spokane Arena, Spokane, Washington (host: University of Idaho)

National semifinals and Championship (Final Four and Championship)

- April 1 and April 3
  - Target Center, Minneapolis, Minnesota (host: University of Minnesota)

In the wake of criticism raised in 2021 over inequities between the men's and women's NCAA basketball tournaments, the NCAA announced that the 2022 women's tournament will be promoted with the "March Madness" branding for the first time.

== Qualification and selection teams ==
=== Automatic qualifiers ===
The following teams automatically qualified for the 2022 NCAA field by virtue of winning their conference's tournament.

Conference	Team	Record	Appearance	Last bid
America East	Albany	23–9	7th	2017
American	UCF	25–3	7th	2021
ASUN	Florida Gulf Coast	29–2	8th	2021
Atlantic 10	UMass	26–6	3rd	1998
ACC	NC State	29–3	27th	2021
Big 12	Texas	26–6	34th	2021
Big East	Connecticut	25–5	33rd	2021
Big Sky	Montana State	22–12	3rd	2017
Big South	Longwood	21–11	1st	Never
Big Ten	Iowa	23–7	28th	2021
Big West	Hawaiʻi	20–9	7th	2016
Colonial	Delaware	24–7	5th	2013
C-USA	Charlotte	22–9	3rd	2009
Horizon	IUPUI	24–4	1st	Never
Ivy League	Princeton	24–4	9th	2019
MAAC	Fairfield	25–6	5th	2001
MAC	Buffalo	25–8	4th	2019
MEAC	Howard	20–9	6th	2001
Missouri Valley	Illinois State	19–13	6th	2008
Mountain West	UNLV	26–6	9th	2002
Northeast	Mount St. Mary's	16–12	4th	2021
Ohio Valley	Belmont	22–7	7th	2021
Pac-12	Stanford	28–3	35th	2021
Patriot	American	23–8	3rd	2018
SEC	Kentucky	19–11	17th	2021
Southern	Mercer	23–6	4th	2021
Southland	Incarnate Word	13–16	1st	Never
SWAC	Jackson State	23–6	6th	2021
Summit	South Dakota	27–5	4th	2021
Sun Belt	UT Arlington	20–7	3rd	2007
West Coast	Gonzaga	26–6	13th	2021
WAC	Stephen F. Austin	28–4	20th	2021

=== Bids by state ===
Bids	State(s)	Schools
1	Arizona	Arizona
1	Arkansas	Arkansas
1	California	Stanford
1	Colorado	Colorado
2	Connecticut	Connecticut, Fairfield
1	Delaware	Delaware
6	Florida	Florida, Florida Gulf Coast, Florida State, Miami, UCF, USF
3	Georgia	Georgia, Georgia Tech, Mercer
1	Hawaii	Hawaiʻi
2	Illinois	DePaul, Illinois State
3	Indiana	Indiana, IUPUI, Notre Dame
2	Iowa	Iowa, Iowa State
2	Kansas	Kansas, Kansas State
2	Kentucky	Kentucky, Louisville
1	Louisiana	LSU
1	Massachusetts	UMass
2	Maryland	Maryland, Mount St. Mary's
1	Michigan	Michigan
2	Mississippi	Jackson State, Ole Miss
1	Missouri	Missouri State
1	Montana	Montana State
2	Nebraska	Creighton, Nebraska
1	Nevada	UNLV
1	New Jersey	Princeton
2	New York	Albany, Buffalo
3	North Carolina	Charlotte, North Carolina, NC State
2	Ohio	Dayton, Ohio State
1	Oklahoma	Oklahoma
1	Oregon	Oregon
1	Pennsylvania	Villanova
1	South Carolina	South Carolina
1	South Dakota	South Dakota
2	Tennessee	Belmont, Tennessee
5	Texas	Baylor, Incarnate Word, Stephen F. Austin, Texas, UT Arlington
2	Utah	BYU, Utah
2	Virginia	Longwood, Virginia Tech
2	Washington	Gonzaga, Washington State
2	Washington, D.C.	American, Howard

=== Tournament seeds (list by region) ===
Greensboro regional – Greensboro Coliseum, Greensboro, North Carolina
Seed	School	Conference	Record	Berth type	Last bid
1	South Carolina	SEC	29–2	At-Large	2021
2	Iowa	Big Ten	23–7	Automatic	2021
3	Iowa State	Big 12	26–6	At-Large	2021
4	Arizona	Pac–12	20–7	At-Large	2021
5	North Carolina	ACC	23–6	At-Large	2021
6	Georgia	SEC	20–9	At-Large	2021
7	Colorado	Pac–12	22–8	At-Large	2013
8	Miami (FL)	ACC	20–12	At-Large	2019
9	South Florida	American	24–8	At-Large	2021
10	Creighton	Big East	20–9	At-Large	2018
11*	Dayton	A10	25–5	At-Large	2018
11*	DePaul	Big East	22–10	At-Large	2019
12	Stephen F. Austin	WAC	28–4	Automatic	2021
13	UNLV	MWC	26–6	Automatic	2002
14	UT Arlington	Sun Belt	20–7	Automatic	2007
15	Illinois State	MVC	19–13	Automatic	2008
16*	Howard	MEAC	20–9	Automatic	2001
16*	Incarnate Word	Southland	13–16	Automatic	Never

Spokane regional – Spokane Arena, Spokane, Washington
Seed	School	Conference	Record	Berth type	Last bid
1	Stanford	Pac–12	28–3	Automatic	2021
2	Texas	Big 12	26–6	Automatic	2021
3	LSU	SEC	25–5	At-Large	2018
4	Maryland	Big Ten	21–8	At-Large	2021
5	Virginia Tech	ACC	23–9	At-Large	2021
6	Ohio State	Big Ten	23–6	At-Large	2018
7	Utah	Pac–12	20–11	At-Large	2011
8	Kansas	Big 12	20–9	At-Large	2013
9	Georgia Tech	ACC	21–10	At-Large	2021
10	Arkansas	SEC	18–13	At-Large	2021
11*	Missouri State	MVC	24–7	At-Large	2021
11*	Florida State	ACC	17–13	At-Large	2021
12	Florida Gulf Coast	ASUN	29–2	Automatic	2021
13	Delaware	CAA	24–7	Automatic	2013
14	Jackson State	SWAC	23–6	Automatic	2021
15	Fairfield	MAAC	25–6	Automatic	2001
16	Montana State	Big Sky	22–12	Automatic	2017

Wichita regional – Intrust Bank Arena, Wichita, Kansas
Seed	School	Conference	Record	Berth type	Last bid
1	Louisville	ACC	25–4	At-Large	2021
2	Baylor	Big 12	27–6	At-Large	2021
3	Michigan	Big Ten	22–6	At-Large	2021
4	Tennessee	SEC	23–8	At-Large	2021
5	Oregon	Pac–12	20–11	At-Large	2021
6	BYU	West Coast	26–3	At-Large	2021
7	Ole Miss	SEC	23–8	At-Large	2007
8	Nebraska	Big Ten	24–8	At-Large	2018
9	Gonzaga	West Coast	26–6	Automatic	2021
10	South Dakota	Summit	27–5	Automatic	2021
11	Villanova	Big East	23–8	At-Large	2018
12	Belmont	Ohio Valley	22–7	Automatic	2021
13	Buffalo	MAC	25–8	Automatic	2019
14	American	Patriot	23–8	Automatic	2018
15	Hawaiʻi	Big West	20–9	Automatic	2016
16	Albany	America East	23–9	Automatic	2017

Bridgeport regional – Total Mortgage Arena, Bridgeport, Connecticut
Seed	School	Conference	Record	Berth type	Last bid
1	NC State	ACC	29–3	Automatic	2021
2	UConn	Big East	25–5	Automatic	2021
3	Indiana	Big Ten	22–8	At-Large	2021
4	Oklahoma	Big 12	24–8	At-Large	2018
5	Notre Dame	ACC	22–8	At-Large	2019
6	Kentucky	SEC	19–11	Automatic	2021
7	UCF	American	25–3	Automatic	2021
8	Washington State	Pac–12	19–10	At-Large	2021
9	Kansas State	Big 12	19–12	At-Large	2019
10	Florida	SEC	21–10	At-Large	2016
11	Princeton	Ivy	24–4	Automatic	2019
12	UMass	Atlantic 10	26–6	Automatic	1998
13	IUPUI	Horizon	24–4	Automatic	Never
14	Charlotte	C-USA	22–9	Automatic	2009
15	Mercer	Southern	23–6	Automatic	2021
16*	Mount St. Mary's	Northeast	16–12	Automatic	2021
16*	Longwood	Big South	21–11	Automatic	Never

*See First Four

== Tournament records ==
- Rebounds—South Carolina recorded 294 rebounds, the most ever recorded by a single team in an NCAA Tournament.

== Tournament bracket ==
All times are listed as Eastern Daylight Time (UTC−4)
* – Denotes overtime period

=== First Four ===
March 16 – Greensboro Region; Columbia, South Carolina
16	Howard	55
16	Incarnate Word	51

March 16 – Greensboro Region; Ames, Iowa
11	Dayton	88
11	DePaul	57

March 17 – Bridgeport Region; Raleigh, North Carolina
16	Mount St. Mary's	70
16	Longwood	74

March 17 – Spokane Region; Baton Rouge, Louisiana
11	Florida State	50
11	Missouri State	61

=== Greensboro regional – Greensboro, North Carolina ===
First round Round of 64; March 18–19
1	South Carolina	79
16	Howard	21
Columbia, South Carolina – Fri/Sun
8	Miami (FL)	78
9	South Florida	66
5	North Carolina	79
12	Stephen F. Austin	66
Tucson, Arizona – Sat/Mon
4	Arizona	72
13	UNLV	67
6	Georgia	70
11	Dayton	54
Ames, Iowa – Fri/Sun
3	Iowa State	78
14	UT Arlington	71
7	Colorado	74
10	Creighton	84
Iowa City, Iowa – Fri/Sun
2	Iowa	98
15	Illinois State	58

Second round Round of 32; March 20–21
1	South Carolina	49
8	Miami (FL)	33
5	North Carolina	63
4	Arizona	45
6	Georgia	44
3	Iowa State	67
10	Creighton	64
2	Iowa	62

Regional semifinals Sweet 16; March 25
1	South Carolina	69
5	North Carolina	61
3	Iowa State	68
10	Creighton	76

Regional final Elite 8 March 27
1	South Carolina	80
10	Creighton	50

==== Greensboro regional final ====
ESPN

March 27
7:00 p.m.

#10 Creighton Bluejays 50, #1 South Carolina Gamecocks 80
Scoring by quarter: 16-23, 9-23, 15-18, 10-16
Pts: Lauren Jenson (12); Rebs: Rachael Saunders (4); Asts: Tatum Rembao (6)	Pts: Aliyah Boston (19); Rebs: Victaria Saxton (11); Asts: Destanni Henderson (3)

Greensboro Coliseum Complex
Attendance: 6,579
Referees: Julie Krommenhoek, Angelica Suffren, Joseph Vaszily

==== Greensboro regional All Tournament team ====
- Aliyah Boston, South Carolina (MOP)
- Destanni Henderson, South Carolina
- Lauren Jensen, Creighton
- Emily Ryan, Iowa State
- Deja Kelly, North Carolina

=== Wichita regional – Wichita, Kansas ===
First round Round of 64; March 18–19
1	Louisville	83
16	Albany	51
Louisville, Kentucky – Fri/Sun
8	Nebraska	55
9	Gonzaga	68
5	Oregon	70
12	Belmont	73**
Knoxville, Tennessee – Sat/Mon
4	Tennessee	80
13	Buffalo	67
6	BYU	57
11	Villanova	61
Ann Arbor, Michigan – Sat/Mon
3	Michigan	74
14	American	39
7	Ole Miss	61
10	South Dakota	75
Waco, Texas – Fri/Sun
2	Baylor	89
15	Hawaiʻi	49

Second round Round of 32; March 20–21
1	Louisville	68
9	Gonzaga	59
12	Belmont	67
4	Tennessee	70
11	Villanova	49
3	Michigan	64
10	South Dakota	61
2	Baylor	47

Regional semifinals Sweet 16; March 26
1	Louisville	76
4	Tennessee	64
3	Michigan	52
10	South Dakota	49

Regional final Elite 8 March 28
1	Louisville	62
3	Michigan	50

==== Wichita regional final ====
ESPN

March 28
9:00 p.m.

#3 Michigan Wolverines 50, #1 Louisville Cardinals 62
Scoring by quarter: 13–17, 14–13, 16–15, 7–17
Pts: Naz Hillmon (18); Rebs: Naz Hillmon (11); Asts: Emily Kiser; Leigha Brown (3)	Pts: Hailey Van Lith (22); Rebs: Emily Engstler (16); Asts: Emily Engstler (4)

Intrust Bank Arena
Attendance: 4695

==== Wichita regional All Tournament team ====
- Hailey Van Lith, Louisville (MOP)
- Emily Engstler, Louisville
- Naz Hillmon, Michigan
- Hannah Sjerven, South Dakota
- Rae Burrell, Tennessee

=== Spokane regional – Spokane, Washington ===
First round Round of 64; March 18–19
1	Stanford	78
16	Montana State	37
Stanford, California – Fri/Sun
8	Kansas	77
9	Georgia Tech	58
5	Virginia Tech	81
12	Florida Gulf Coast	84
College Park, Maryland – Fri/Sun
4	Maryland	102
13	Delaware	71
6	Ohio State	63
11	Missouri State	56
Baton Rouge, Louisiana – Sat/Mon
3	LSU	83
14	Jackson State	77
7	Utah	92
10	Arkansas	69
Austin, Texas – Fri/Sun
2	Texas	70
15	Fairfield	52

Second round Round of 32; March 20–21
1	Stanford	91
8	Kansas	65
12	Florida Gulf Coast	65
4	Maryland	89
6	Ohio State	79
3	LSU	64
7	Utah	56
2	Texas	78

Regional semifinals Sweet 16; March 25
1	Stanford	72
4	Maryland	66
6	Ohio State	63
2	Texas	66

Regional final Elite 8 March 27
1	Stanford	59
2	Texas	50

==== Spokane regional final ====
ESPN

March 27
9:00 p.m.

#2 Texas Longhorns 50, #1 Stanford Cardinal 59
Scoring by quarter: 14–14, 13–16, 13–15, 10–14
Pts: Joanne Allen-Taylor (15); Rebs: Rori Harmon (7); Asts: Rori Harmon (6)	Pts: Lexie Hull (20); Rebs: Haley Jones (12); Asts: Lacie Hull; Haley Jones (4)

Spokane Arena
Attendance: 7,739
Referees: Dee Kantner, Michol Murray, Kenneth Nash

==== Spokane regional All Tournament team ====
- Haley Jones, Stanford (MOP)
- Lexie Hull, Stanford
- Rori Harmon, Texas
- Cameron Brink, Stanford
- Joanne Allen-Taylor, Texas

=== Bridgeport regional – Bridgeport, Connecticut ===
First round Round of 64; March 19
1	NC State	96
16	Longwood	68
Raleigh, North Carolina – Sat/Mon
8	Washington State	40
9	Kansas State	50
5	Notre Dame	89
12	UMass	78
Norman, Oklahoma – Sat/Mon
4	Oklahoma	78
13	IUPUI	72
6	Kentucky	62
11	Princeton	69
Bloomington, Indiana – Sat/Mon
3	Indiana	85
14	Charlotte	51
7	UCF	69
10	Florida	52
Storrs, Connecticut – Sat/Mon
2	Connecticut	83
15	Mercer	38

Second round Round of 32; March 20–21
1	NC State	89
9	Kansas State	57
5	Notre Dame	108
4	Oklahoma	64
11	Princeton	55
3	Indiana	56
7	UCF	47
2	Connecticut	52

Regional semifinals Sweet 16; March 26
1	NC State	66
5	Notre Dame	63
3	Indiana	58
2	Connecticut	75

Regional final Elite 8 March 28
1	NC State	87
2	Connecticut	91**

==== Bridgeport regional final ====
ESPN

March 28
7:00 p.m.

#2 Connecticut Huskies 91, #1 NC State Wolfpack 87 (2OT)
Scoring by quarter: 16-14, 18-14, 10-15, 17-18, Overtime: 16-16, 14-10
Pts: Paige Bueckers (27); Rebs: Olivia Nelson-Ododa (7); Asts: Olivia Nelson-Ododa (4)	Pts: Jakia Brown-Turner (20); Rebs: Elissa Cunane; Kayla Jones (9); Asts: Raina Perez (10)

Total Mortgage Arena
Attendance: 10,119
Referees: Tiara Cruse, Benny Luna, Pualani Spurlock

==== Bridgeport regional All Tournament team ====
- Paige Bueckers, Connecticut (MOP)
- Christyn Williams, Connecticut
- Azzi Fudd, Connecticut
- Elissa Cunane, NC State
- Olivia Miles, Notre Dame

=== Final Four – Minneapolis, Minnesota ===
National semifinals Final Four; April 1
G1	South Carolina	72
W1	Louisville	59
S1	Stanford	58
B2	Connecticut	63

National championship game April 3
G1	South Carolina	64
B2	Connecticut	49

==== National semifinals ====
ESPN

Friday, April 1
6:00 pm CDT

G1 South Carolina Gamecocks 72, W1 Louisville Cardinals 59
Scoring by quarter: 17–10, 17–18, 23–20, 15–11
Pts: Aliyah Boston (23); Rebs: Aliyah Boston (18); Asts: Aliyah Boston; Destanni Henderson; Saniya Rivers (4)	Pts: Emily Engstler (18); Rebs: Emily Engstler; Hailey Van Lith (9); Asts: Hailey Van Lith (3)

Target Center
Minneapolis, MN
Referees: Dee Kantner, Kevin Pethtel, Pualani Spurlock-Welsh

ESPN

Friday, April 1
8:30 pm CDT

S1 Stanford Cardinal 58, B2 Connecticut Huskies 63
Scoring by quarter: 9–12, 17–15, 11–12, 21–24
Pts: Haley Jones (20); Rebs: Haley Jones (11); Asts: Haley Jones (3)	Pts: Paige Bueckers (14); Rebs: Olivia Nelson-Ododa (10); Asts: Paige Bueckers (5)

Target Center
Minneapolis, MN
Attendance: 18,268
Referees: Melissa Barlow, Joseph Vaszily, Gina Cross

==== National championship ====
ESPN

April 3, 2022
7:00 p.m. CDT

Box score

No. 2 UConn Huskies 49, No. 1 South Carolina Gamecocks 64
Scoring by quarter: 8–22, 19–13, 10–11, 12–18
Pts: P. Bueckers – 14; Rebs: P. Bueckers – 6 Asts: C. Williams, N. Mühl – 3	Pts: D. Henderson – 26; Rebs: A. Boston – 16; Asts: D. Henderson – 4

Target Center – Minneapolis, Minnesota
Attendance: 18,304
Referees: Maj Forsberg, Michol Murray, Michael McConnell

==== Final Four all-tournament team ====
- Haley Jones, Stanford
- Paige Bueckers, Connecticut
- Zia Cooke, South Carolina
- Destanni Henderson, South Carolina
- Aliyah Boston, South Carolina (MOP)

== Record by conference ==
Conference	Bids	Record	Win %	FF	R64	R32	S16	E8	F4	CG	NC
SEC	8	10–7	.588	–	8	4	2	1	1	1	1
Big East	4	9–4	.692	1	3	3	2	2	1	1	–
ACC	8	12–8 (Note: The ACC record includes one game played between members of the conference (NC State–Notre Dame). Excluding this game, the conference has a record of 11–6 and a winning percentage of .647.)	.600	1	7	5	4	2	1	–	–
Pac-12	6	6–6	.500	–	6	3	1	1	1	–	–
Big Ten	6	10–6	.625	–	6	5	4	1	–	–	–
Big 12	6	9–6	.600	–	6	6	2	1	–	–	–
Summit	1	2–1	.667	–	1	1	1	–	–	–	–
American	2	1–2	.333	–	2	1	–	–	–	–	–
WCC	2	1–2	.333	–	2	1	–	–	–	–	–
Atlantic Sun	1	1–1	.500	–	1	1	–	–	–	–	–
Ivy League	1	1–1	.500	–	1	1	–	–	–	–	–
Ohio Valley	1	1–1	.500	–	1	1	–	–	–	–	–
Atlantic 10	2	1–2	.333	1	2	–	–	–	–	–	–
Missouri Valley	2	1–2	.333	1	2	–	–	–	–	–	–
Big South	1	1–1	.500	1	1	–	–	–	–	–	–
MEAC	1	1–1	.500	1	1	–	–	–	–	–	–
America East	1	0–1	.000	–	1	–	–	–	–	–	–
Big Sky	1	0–1	.000	–	1	–	–	–	–	–	–
Big West	1	0–1	.000	–	1	–	–	–	–	–	–
C-USA	1	0–1	.000	–	1	–	–	–	–	–	–
Colonial	1	0–1	.000	–	1	–	–	–	–	–	–
Horizon	1	0–1	.000	–	1	–	–	–	–	–	–
MAAC	1	0–1	.000	–	1	–	–	–	–	–	–
MAC	1	0–1	.000	–	1	–	–	–	–	–	–
Mountain West	1	0–1	.000	–	1	–	–	–	–	–	–
Patriot	1	0–1	.000	–	1	–	–	–	–	–	–
SWAC	1	0–1	.000	–	1	–	–	–	–	–	–
Southern	1	0–1	.000	–	1	–	–	–	–	–	–
Sun Belt	1	0–1	.000	–	1	–	–	–	–	–	–
WAC	1	0–1	.000	–	1	–	–	–	–	–	–
Northeast	1	0–1	.000	1	–	–	–	–	–	–	–
Southland	1	0–1	.000	1	–	–	–	–	–	–	–

- The FF, R64, R32, S16, E8, F4, CG, and NC columns indicate how many teams from each conference were in the first four, round of 64 (first round), round of 32 (second round), Sweet 16, Elite Eight, Final Four, championship game, and national champion, respectively.

== Game summaries and tournament notes ==
=== Upsets ===
==== Greensboro ====
- No. 10 Creighton defeated No. 2 Iowa 64–62.
- No. 10 Creighton defeated No. 3 Iowa State 76–68.

==== Wichita ====
- No. 11 Villanova defeated No. 6 BYU 61–57.
- No. 12 Belmont defeated No. 5 Oregon 73–70 in double overtime.
- No. 10 South Dakota defeated No. 2 Baylor 61–47.

==== Spokane ====
- No. 12 Florida Gulf Coast defeated No. 5 Virginia Tech 84–81.

==== Bridgeport ====
- No. 11 Princeton defeated No. 6 Kentucky 69–62.

== Media coverage ==
=== Television ===
ESPN served as the exclusive broadcaster of the tournament, with all games airing on either ESPN, ESPN2, ESPNU, ESPNews, or ABC. ESPN offered Megacast coverage for the Women's Final Four and championship game, including The Bird & Taurasi Show on ESPN2 (hosted by Sue Bird and Diana Taurasi, with similarities to ESPN's Monday Night Football with Payton and Eli), along with a feed featuring enhanced statistics and augmented reality graphics using player and ball tracking, and "Beyond the Rim" and "On the Rail" camera options on ESPN+.

==== Studio host and analysts ====
- Elle Duncan (Host) (First Four, First, Second rounds, Regionals, Final Four, and National championship game)
- Kelsey Riggs (Host) (First Four, First, and Second rounds)
- Rebecca Lobo (Analyst) (First Four, First, Second rounds, Final Four, and National championship game)
- Andraya Carter (Analyst) (First Four, First, and Second rounds)
- Nikki Fargas (Analyst) (First Four, First, Second rounds, Regionals, Final Four, and National championship game)
- Monica McNutt (Analyst) (First Four, First, Second rounds, and Regionals)
- Carolyn Peck (Analyst) (Final Four and National championship game)

==== Broadcast assignments ====
First Four

- Courtney Lyle and Carolyn Peck – Columbia, South Carolina
- Jenn Hildreth and Mike Thibault – Ames, Iowa
- Sam Ravech and Kelly Gramlich – Raleigh, North Carolina
- Brenda VanLengen and Holly Warlick – Baton Rouge, Louisiana

First & second rounds Friday/Sunday (Subregionals)

- Courtney Lyle and Carolyn Peck – Columbia, South Carolina
- Elise Woodward and Andrea Lloyd – Waco, Texas
- Beth Mowins and Christy Thomaskutty – Iowa City, Iowa
- Dave O'Brien and Christy Winters-Scott – College Park, Maryland
- John Brickley and Meghan McKeown – Louisville, Kentucky
- Angel Gray and Chelsea Gray – Austin, Texas
- Jenn Hildreth and Mike Thibault – Ames, Iowa
- Tiffany Greene and Steffi Sorensen – Stanford, California

First & second rounds Saturday/Monday (Subregionals)

- Sam Ravech and Kelly Gramlich – Raleigh, North Carolina
- Pam Ward and Stephanie White – Storrs, Connecticut
- Sam Gore and Aja Ellison – Ann Arbor, Michigan
- Brenda VanLengen and Holly Warlick – Baton Rouge, Louisiana
- Kevin Fitzgerald and Helen Williams – Bloomington, Indiana
- Eric Frede and Tamika Catchings – Knoxville, Tennessee
- Roy Philpott and Brooke Weisbrod – Norman, Oklahoma
- Ann Schatz and Dan Hughes – Tucson, Arizona

Regionals (Sweet 16 and Elite Eight)

- Ryan Ruocco, Rebecca Lobo, Holly Rowe, and Andraya Carter – Bridgeport, Connecticut
- Beth Mowins, Debbie Antonelli, and Angel Gray – Spokane, Washington
- Courtney Lyle, Carolyn Peck, and Steffi Sorensen – Greensboro, North Carolina
- Pam Ward, Stephanie White, and Christy Winters-Scott – Wichita, Kansas

Final Four and National Championship

- Ryan Ruocco, Rebecca Lobo, Holly Rowe, and Andraya Carter – Minneapolis, Minnesota

=== Radio ===
Westwood One had exclusive radio rights to the entire tournament.

Regionals

- Matt Chazanow and Krista Blunk – Spokane, Washington
- Sam Neidermann and Ali Jaques – Greensboro, North Carolina
- Lance Medow and Kim Adams – Bridgeport, Connecticut
- Phil Constantino and Kristen Kozlowski – Wichita, Kansas

Final Four and Championship

- Ryan Radtke, Debbie Antonelli, and Krista Blunk – Minneapolis, Minnesota

== See also ==
- 2022 Women's National Invitation Tournament
- 2022 Women's Basketball Invitational
- 2022 NCAA Division II women's basketball tournament
- 2022 NCAA Division III women's basketball tournament
- 2022 NCAA Division I men's basketball tournament
