= 2022 Northeast Conference women's basketball tournament =

- Classification: Division I
- Season: 2021–22
- Teams: 9
- Site: Campus sites
- Television: NEC Front Row, ESPNU,

The 2022 Northeast Conference women's basketball tournament was the postseason basketball tournament for the Northeast Conference for the 2021–22 NCAA Division I women's basketball season. The tournament took place March 5, 7, 10, and 13, 2022 and all tournament games were played on home arenas of the higher-seeded school. The tournament winner received an automatic bid to the NCAA tournament.

2021–22 Northeast Conference women's basketball standings
	Conf.				Overall
Team	W		L	PCT	W		L	PCT
Fairleigh Dickinson	15	–	3	.833	19	–	12	.613
St. Francis Brooklyn	13	–	5	.722	17	–	10	.630
Mount St. Mary's †	11	–	7	.611	16	–	13	.552
Wagner	10	–	8	.556	17	–	12	.586
LIU	9	–	9	.500	9	–	18	.333
Saint Francis (PA)	8	–	10	.444	8	–	22	.267
Merrimack*	7	–	11	.389	9	–	17	.346
Bryant	6	–	12	.333	10	–	22	.313
Sacred Heart	6	–	12	.333	8	–	17	.320
Central Connecticut	5	–	13	.278	6	–	20	.231
* ineligible for the 2022 NCAA tournament due to transition period
† 2022 NEC tournament winner

== Seeds ==
All nine of the eligible ten teams in the conference qualified for the tournament. Teams were seeded by record within the conference, with a tiebreaker system to seed teams with identical conference records.

The tiebreakers used by the NEC are 1) head-to-head records of teams with identical records, 2) comparison of records against individual teams in the conference starting with the top-ranked team(s) and working down and 3) NCAA NET Rankings available on day following the conclusion of Northeast Conference regular-season play.

- Note: Merrimack College joined the Northeast Conference from Division II Northeast-10 Conference. The Warriors will not be eligible for the NEC Tournament until 2024.

Seed	School	Conf.	Tiebreaker
1	Fairleigh Dickinson	15-3	
2	St. Francis Brooklyn	13-5	
3	Mount St. Mary's	11-7	
4	Wagner	10-8	
5	LIU	9-9	
6	St. Francis (PA)	8-10	
7	Bryant	6-12	2-0 vs. Sacred Heart
8	Sacred Heart	6-12	0-2 vs. Bryant
9	Central Connecticut	5-13	

== Schedule ==
Session	Game	Time*	Matchup	Score	Television
Opening Round – Saturday, March 5
1	1	7:00 pm	No. 9 Central Connecticut at No. 8 Sacred Heart	58-62	NEC Front Row
Quarterfinals – Monday, March 7
2	2	7:00 pm	No. 8 Sacred Heart at No. 1 Farleigh Dickinson	58-66	NEC Front Row
2	3	7:00 pm	No. 5 LIU at No. 4 Wagner	55-66	NEC Front Row
3	4	7:00 pm	No. 7 Bryant at No. 2 St. Francis Brooklyn	65-53	NEC Front Row
3	5	7:00 pm	No. 6 St. Francis (PA) at No. 3 Mount St. Mary's	53-69	NEC Front Row
Semifinals – Thursday, March 10
4	6	7:00 pm	No. 7 Bryant at No. 1 Farleigh Dickinson	44-38	NEC Front Row
4	7	7:00 pm	No. 4 Wagner at No. 3 Mount St. Mary's	50-62	NEC Front Row
Championship – Sunday, March 13
5	8	12:00 pm	No. 7 Bryant at No. 3 Mount St. Mary's		ESPNU
*Game times in ET. Rankings denote tournament seed

== Bracket ==
Opening Round; Saturday, March 5 NEC Front Row
8	Sacred Heart	62
9	Central Connecticut	58

Quarterfinals; Monday, March 7 NEC Front Row
1	Fairleigh Dickinson	69
8	Sacred Heart	53
4	Wagner	65
5	LIU	55
2	St. Francis Brooklyn	63
7	Bryant	65
3	Mount St. Mary's	69
6	St. Francis (PA)	53

Semifinals; Thursday, March 10; NEC Front Row
1	Farleigh Dickinson	33
7	Bryant	44
3	Mount St. Mary's	62
4	Wagner	50

Championship; Sunday, March 13; ESPNU
7	Bryant	42
3	Mount St. Mary's	60

* denotes overtime period.
