= 2021–22 Howard Bison women's basketball team =

Intercollegiate basketball season

2021–22 Howard Bison women's basketball

MEAC regular season co-champions MEAC tournament champions

NCAA tournament, first round
- Conference: Mid-Eastern Athletic Conference
- Record: 21–10 (11–3 MEAC)
- Head coach: Ty Grace (7th season)
- Assistant coaches: Brian Davis (5th season); Donnie Stith (4th season); Jeanne-Marie Wilson (1st season)
- Home arena: Burr Gymnasium

2021–22 MEAC women's basketball standings
	Conf.				Overall
Team	W		L	PCT	W		L	PCT
Howard †	11	–	3	.786	21	–	10	.677
Norfolk State	11	–	3	.786	17	–	12	.586
Morgan State	11	–	3	.786	18	–	8	.692
Coppin State	9	–	5	.643	15	–	13	.536
Maryland Eastern Shore	7	–	7	.500	12	–	16	.429
South Carolina State	4	–	10	.286	4	–	25	.138
North Carolina Central	3	–	11	.214	5	–	20	.200
Delaware State	0	–	14	.000	0	–	24	.000
† 2022 MEAC tournament winner

The 2021–22 Howard Bison women's basketball team represented Howard University during the 2021–22 NCAA Division I women's basketball season. The Bison, led by seventh-year head coach Ty Grace, played their home games at Burr Gymnasium in Washington, D.C. as members of the Mid-Eastern Athletic Conference (MEAC).

They finished the season with a 21–10 overall record, 11–3 in MEAC play, to finish in a three-way tie for first place. As the first seed in the MEAC tournament, they defeated Delaware State, Maryland Eastern Shore and Norfolk State to win the championship. They received an automatic bid to the NCAA tournament, where they were one of the sixteenth seeds in the Greensboro Region. They defeated Incarnate Word in the First Four before losing to eventual champions South Carolina in the first round. The Bison lost 79–21, with their total being a new record for lowest team score in any D-I women's tournament game. The also trailed 44–4 at halftime, with their score also being the lowest in a half in tournament history.

== Previous season ==
The Bison finished the season with a 15–4 overall record, 10–2 in MEAC play, to finish in first place in the North Division. As the first seed in the MEAC tournament, they defeated Norfolk State before losing to North Carolina A&T State in the final. They were not invited to the NCAA tournament or the WNIT.

== Roster ==
2021–22 Howard Bison women's basketball team
Players
Coaches

Pos.	#	Name	Height	Year	Previous school	Hometown
F	00	Anzhane' Hutton	6 ft 0 in (1.83 m)	So	Cedar Hill	Dallas, TX
G	1	Destiny Howell	5 ft 11 in (1.8 m)	So	St. Francis Prep	Queens, NY
G	2	Iyanna Warren	5 ft 3 in (1.6 m)	Jr	Oxon Hill	Accokeek, MD
G	4	Nyla Cooper	5 ft 7 in (1.7 m)	Fr	Jack Britt	Fayetteville, NC
F	5	Marissa Steel	6 ft 0 in (1.83 m)	Fr	Laurel	Laurel, MD
G	10	Nia Nelson	5 ft 10 in (1.78 m)	Fr	Myers Park	Charlotte, NC
F	12	Amirah Allen	6 ft 1 in (1.85 m)	Fr	Wakefield	Raleigh, NC
G	13	Gia Thorpe	5 ft 9 in (1.75 m)	Sr	Winchester Thurston	Pittsburgh, PA
G	15	Aniya Wilson	5 ft 7 in (1.7 m)	So	Oxon Hill	Accokeek, MD
F	22	Kaiya Creek	5 ft 10 in (1.78 m)	So	National Christian Academy	Seat Pleasant, MD
G	23	Vanessa Udoji	5 ft 10 in (1.78 m)	GS	Northfield Mount Hermon	Randolph, MA
F	24	Brooklyn Fort-Davis	6 ft 0 in (1.83 m)	Jr	Whitney Young	Chicago, IL
F	32	Krislyn Marsh	6 ft 0 in (1.83 m)	Sr	Duncanville	Houston, TX
G	33	Kaniyah Harris	5 ft 9 in (1.75 m)	So	C.H. Flowers	Washington, D.C.

Head coach

- Ty Grace (New Haven)

Assistant coach(es)

- Brian Davis (Tennessee Tech)
- Donnie Stith (Tulane)
- Jeanne-Marie Wilson (St. Augustine's)

Legend

- (C) Team captain
- (S) Suspended
- (I) Ineligible
- (W) Walk-on
- Injured
- Current redshirt

Roster
Last update: May 18, 2022

== Schedule ==
Date time, TV	Rank^{#}	Opponent^{#}	Result	Record	Site (attendance) city, state
Non-conference regular season
November 9, 2021*; 3:00 p.m.		at Houston	L 48–80	0–1	Fertitta Center (164); Houston, TX
November 11, 2021*; 7:30 p.m., ESPN+		at North Texas	L 56–94	0–2	UNT Coliseum (1,285); Denton, TX
November 15, 2021*; 7:00 p.m., FloHoops		at Elon	L 44–60	0–3	Schar Center (1,121); Elon, NC
November 21, 2021*; 2:00 p.m.		at Saint Peters	W 62–52	1–3	Yanitelli Center (0); Jersey City, NJ
November 23, 2021*; 6:00 p.m.		at Mount St. Mary's	W 56–49	2–3	Knott Arena (643); Emmitsburg, MD
November 27, 2021*; 2:00 p.m.		at Towson	L 52–96	2–4	SECU Arena (409); Towson, MD
December 1, 2021*; 7:00 p.m.		Loyola (MD)	W 61–59	3–4	Burr Gymnasium (506); Washington, D.C.
December 4, 2021*; 2:00 p.m.		Hofstra	W 64–62 ^{OT}	4–4	Burr Gymnasium (497); Washington, D.C.
December 12, 2021*; 2:00 p.m.		at George Washington	L 53–62	4–5	Smith Center (307); Washington, D.C.
December 14, 2021*; 7:00 p.m.		UMBC	W 74–61	5–5	Burr Gymnasium (550); Washington, D.C.
December 17, 2021*; 5:00 p.m.		Memphis	L 50–56	5–6	Burr Gymnasium (146); Washington, D.C.
December 21, 2021*; 1:00 p.m.		American	Canceled		Burr Gymnasium; Washington, D.C.
December 29, 2021*; 7:00 p.m.		Dayton	Canceled		UD Arena; Dayton, OH
January 15, 2022*; 2:00 p.m.		at Frostburg State	W 100–53	6–6	Bobcat Arena (56); Frostburg, MD
MEAC regular season
January 17, 2022; 2:00 p.m.		at Maryland Eastern Shore	W 67–52	7–6 (1–0)	Hytche Athletic Center (150); Princess Anne, MD
January 22, 2022; 2:00 p.m.		at Morgan State	L 61–67	7–7 (1–1)	Hill Field House (654); Baltimore, MD
January 24, 2022; 5:30 p.m.		at Coppin State	W 70–64	8–7 (2–1)	Physical Education Complex (317); Baltimore, MD
January 29, 2022; 2:00 p.m.		at North Carolina Central	W 66–55	9–7 (3–1)	McDougald–McLendon Arena (1,088); Durham, NC
January 31, 2022; 5:30 p.m.		at South Carolina State	W 67–59	10–7 (4–1)	SHM Memorial Center (197); Orangeburg, SC
February 5, 2022; 2:00 p.m.		Maryland Eastern Shore	L 59–66	10–8 (4–2)	Burr Gymnasium (719); Washington, D.C.
February 7, 2022; 5:30 p.m.		at Delaware State	W 83–49	11–8 (5–2)	Memorial Hall (210); Dover, DE
February 10, 2022; 5:30 p.m.		Norfolk State	W 71–67	12–8 (6–2)	Burr Gymnasium (541); Washington, D.C.
February 12, 2022; 2:00 p.m.		Delaware State	W 83–44	13–8 (7–2)	Burr Gymnasium (613); Washington, D.C.
February 19, 2022; 4:00 p.m.		Morgan State	W 81–63	14–8 (8–2)	Burr Gymnasium (531); Washington, D.C.
February 21, 2022; 4:00 p.m.		Coppin State	W 70–67	15–8 (9–2)	Burr Gymnasium (412); Washington, D.C.
February 26, 2022; 2:00 p.m.		North Carolina Central	W 65–63	16–8 (10–2)	Burr Gymnasium (703); Washington, D.C.
February 28, 2022; 5:30 p.m.		South Carolina State	W 64–48	17–8 (11–2)	Burr Gymnasium (1,281); Washington, D.C.
March 3, 2022; 5:30 p.m.		at Norfolk State	L 58–62	17–9 (11–3)	Echols Memorial Hall (678); Norfolk, VA
MEAC tournament
March 9, 2022; Noon, ESPN+	(1)	vs. (8) Delaware State; Quarterfinals	W 87–51	18–9	Norfolk Scope; Norfolk, VA
March 11, 2022; Noon, ESPN+	(1)	vs. (5) Maryland Eastern Shore; Semifinals	W 68–54	19–9	Norfolk Scope; Norfolk, VA
March 12, 2022; 3:30 p.m., ESPN+	(1)	vs. (2) Norfolk State; Final	W 61–44	20–9	Norfolk Scope; Norfolk, VA
NCAA tournament
March 16, 2022; 7:00 p.m., ESPNU	(16 G)	vs. (16 G) Incarnate Word; First Four	W 55–51	21–9	Colonial Life Arena; Columbia, SC
March 18, 2022; 2:00 p.m., ESPN	(16 G)	at (1 G) No. 1 South Carolina; First round	L 21–79	21–10	Colonial Life Arena (8,478); Columbia, SC
*Non-conference game. ^{#}Rankings from AP poll. (#) Tournament seedings in parentheses. G=Greensboro. All times are in Eastern.

== Rankings ==
Ranking movements Legend: — = Not ranked
	Week																		
Poll	Pre	1	2	3	4	5	6	7	8	9	10	11	12	13	14	15	16	17	Final
AP	—	—	—	—	—	—	—	—	—	—	—	—	—	—	—	—	—	—	—
Coaches	—	—	—	—	—	—	—	—	—	—	—	—	—	—	—	—	—	—	—

Legend
	Increase in ranking
	Decrease in ranking
	Not ranked previous week
(RV)	Received votes
(NR)	Not ranked and did not receive votes

The Coaches Poll did not release a Week 2 poll and the AP poll did not release a poll after the NCAA tournament.
