= Illinois State Redbirds women's basketball =

Illinois State Redbirds
2025–26 Illinois State Redbirds women's basketball team
- University: Illinois State University
- Head coach: Kristen Gillespie (9th season)
- Location: Normal, Illinois
- Arena: CEFCU Arena (capacity: 10,200)
- Conference: Missouri Valley
- Nickname: Redbirds
- Colors: Red and white

NCAA Division I tournament round of 32
- 1989

NCAA Division I tournament appearances
- 1983, 1985, 1989, 2005, 2008, 2022

AIAW tournament second round
- 1981

AIAW tournament appearances
- 1972, 1974, 1981

Conference tournament champions
- 1983, 1989, 2005, 2008, 2022

Conference regular-season champions
- 1985, 1988, 1989, 1990, 2008, 2009, 2010, 2023

Uniforms
Home	Away

The Illinois State Redbirds women's basketball team represents Illinois State University, located in Normal, Illinois, in NCAA Division I basketball competition.

== History ==
Illinois State began play in 1971. As of the end of 2023–2024 season, the Redbirds have an all-time record of 861–692.

They have:

- Made the NCAA tournament in 1983, 1985, 1989, 2005, 2008, and 2022.
- Made the WNIT in 1980, 1982, 1984, 1988, 1990, 1996, 2007, 2009, 2010, 2011, 2012, 2013, 2021, 2023, 2024, 2025, and 2026.
- Won the regular season title in 1985, 1988, 1989, 1990, 2008 (shared), 2009, 2010, and 2023 (shared).
- Won the Missouri Valley Conference tournament in 1983, 1989, 2005, 2008, and 2022.

== Postseason results ==
=== NCAA Division I ===
Year	Seed	Round	Opponent	Result
1983	6	First round	(3) Kansas State	L 72−91
1985	#8	First Round	#1 Louisiana Tech	L 57−81
1989	#7	First Round; Second Round	#10 Northwestern State #2 Stanford	W 100–79; L 77−105
2005	#15	First Round	#2 Baylor	L 70−91
2008	#13	First Round	#4 Oklahoma	L 61−69
2022	#15	First Round	#2 Iowa	L 58−69

=== AIAW Division I ===
The Redbirds made three appearances in the AIAW National Division I basketball tournament, with a combined record of 2–5.

Year	Round	Opponent	Result
1972	First Round; Consolation First Round	Mississippi State for Women; Long Beach State	L, 41–59; L, 42–48
1974	First Round; Consolation First Round; Consolation Second Round	Stephen F. Austin; Utah State; Queens (NY)	L, 41–59; W, 74–46; L, 48–52
1981	First Round; Second Round	Texas; Tennessee	W, 66–63; L, 63–78
