= 2022 Big Sky Conference women's basketball tournament =

- Classification: Division I
- Season: 2021–22
- Teams: 11
- Site: Idaho Central Arena; Boise, Idaho
- Champions: Montana State (3rd title)
- Winning coach: Tricia Binford (2nd title)
- MVP: Darian White (Montana State)
- Television: ESPN+

The 2022 Big Sky Conference women's basketball tournament was the postseason tournament for the Big Sky Conference, held March 7–11 at Idaho Central Arena in Boise, Idaho. It was the 39th edition of the tournament, which debuted in 1983.

2021–22 Big Sky women's basketball standings
	Conf.				Overall
Team	W		L	PCT	W		L	PCT
Idaho State	15	–	5	.750	19	–	12	.613
Montana State †	14	–	6	.700	22	–	13	.629
Southern Utah	14	–	6	.700	18	–	12	.600
Northern Arizona	12	–	8	.600	17	–	14	.548
Montana	12	–	8	.600	19	–	11	.633
Idaho	11	–	9	.550	14	–	18	.438
Sacramento State	10	–	10	.500	14	–	16	.467
Northern Colorado	9	–	11	.450	15	–	16	.484
Eastern Washington	7	–	13	.350	9	–	21	.300
Weber State	6	–	14	.300	11	–	20	.355
Portland State	0	–	20	.000	5	–	24	.172
† Big Sky tournament winner

== Seeds ==
The eleven teams were seeded by conference record, with a tiebreaker system used to seed teams with identical conference records. The top five teams received a first-round bye.

Seed	School	Record	Tiebreaker 1	Tiebreaker 2	Tiebreaker 3	Tiebreaker 4
1	Idaho State	15-5				
2	Montana State	14–6	1-1 vs. Southern Utah	1-1 vs. Idaho State	2-0 vs. Northern Arizona	1-1 vs. Montana
3	Southern Utah	14-6	1–1 vs Montana State	1–1 vs Idaho State	2-0 vs. Northern Arizona	0-2 vs. Montana
4	Northern Arizona	12-8	1–1 vs. Montana	1-1 vs. Idaho State		
5	Montana	12-8	1-1 vs. Northern Arizona	0-2 vs. Idaho State		
6	Idaho	11–9				
7	Sacramento State	10–10				
8	Northern Colorado	9-11				
9	Eastern Washington	7-13				
10	Weber State	6-14				
11	Portland State	0-20				

== Schedule ==
Session	Game	Time	Matchup	Score	Television	Attendance
First round – Monday, March 7
1	1	2:00pm	No. 8 Northern Colorado vs. No. 9 Eastern Washington	64–45	ESPN+	685
1	2	5:30pm	No. 7 Sacramento State vs. No. 10 Weber State	64–74	ESPN+	685
1	3	8:00 pm	No. 6 Idaho vs. No. 11 Portland State	75–52	ESPN+	1,276
Quarterfinals – Tuesday, March 8
2	4	12:00 pm	No. 1 Idaho State vs. No. 8 Northern Colorado	54-72	ESPN+	863
2	5	2:30 pm	No. 4 Northern Arizona vs. No. 5 Montana	75–57	ESPN+	955
3	6	5:30 pm	No. 2 Montana State vs. No. 10 Weber State	81–60	ESPN+	1,387
3	7	8:00 pm	No. 3 Southern Utah vs. No. 6 Idaho	64–77	ESPN+	1,365
Semifinals – Wednesday, March 9
4	8	5:30 pm	No. 8 Northern Colorado vs. No. 4 Northern Arizona	67–72	ESPN+	1,103
4	9	8:00 pm	No. 2 Montana State vs. No. 6 Idaho	73–67	ESPN+	1,103
Championship game – Friday, March 11
5	10	1:00 pm	No. 4 Northern Arizona vs. No. 2 Montana State	64–75	ESPN+	956

== Bracket ==
First round Monday, March 7
8	Northern Colorado	64
9	Eastern Washington	45
7	Sacramento State	64
10	Weber State	74
6	Idaho	75
11	Portland State	52

Quarterfinals; Tuesday, March 8
1	Idaho State	54
8	Northern Colorado	72
4	Northern Arizona	75
5	Montana	57
2	Montana State	81
10	Weber State	60
3	Southern Utah	64
6	Idaho	77

Semifinals; Wednesday, March 9
8	Northern Colorado	67
4	Northern Arizona	72
2	Montana State	73
6	Idaho	67

Championship; Friday, March 11
4	Northern Arizona	64
2	Montana State	75
