= 2021–22 Missouri State Lady Bears basketball team =

Women's college basketball season

2021–22 Missouri State Lady Bears basketball

NCAA tournament, first round
- Conference: Missouri Valley Conference
- Record: 25–8 (14–4 The Valley)
- Head coach: Amaka Agugua-Hamilton (3rd season)
- Assistant coaches: Alysiah Bond; Tori Jankoska; CJ Jones
- Home arena: JQH Arena

2021–22 Missouri Valley Conference women's basketball standings
	Conf.				Overall
Team	W		L	PCT	W		L	PCT
Southern Illinois	15	–	3	.833	21	–	10	.677
Missouri State	14	–	4	.778	25	–	8	.758
Northern Iowa	13	–	5	.722	23	–	11	.676
Illinois State †	12	–	6	.667	19	–	14	.576
Loyola Chicago	10	–	8	.556	18	–	12	.600
Valparaiso	9	–	9	.500	11	–	19	.367
Drake	9	–	9	.500	20	–	14	.588
Indiana State	5	–	13	.278	11	–	20	.355
Evansville	2	–	16	.111	8	–	22	.267
Bradley	1	–	17	.056	4	–	24	.143
† 2022 MVC tournament winner

The 2021–22 Missouri State Lady Bears basketball team represented Missouri State University during the 2021–22 NCAA Division I women's basketball season. The Lady Bears, led by third-year head coach Amaka Agugua-Hamilton, played their home games at JQH Arena in Springfield, Missouri and were members of the Missouri Valley Conference (MVC).

They finished the season 25–8 and 14–4 in conference play to finish in second place. As the second seed in the Missouri Valley tournament, they defeated Drake in the quarterfinals before losing to Northern Iowa in the semifinals. They received an at-large bid to the NCAA tournament and were one of the eleven seeds in the Spokane Regional. They defeated fellow eleven seed Florida State in the First Four before falling to the sixth seed Ohio State in the first round.

== Previous season ==
The Lady Bears finished the 2020–21 season 23–3 and 16–0 in conference play to finish as Missouri Valley Conference champions. As the first seed in the Missouri Valley tournament, they defeated Southern Illinois in the quarterfinals before having to forfeit their semifinal game against Bradley due to a positive COVID-19 result. They received an at-large bid to the NCAA tournament and were the fifth seed in the Alamo Regional. They defeated twelve seed UC Davis and thirteen seed Wright State before falling to the first seed Stanford in the Sweet Sixteen.

== Roster ==
2021–22 Missouri State Bears women's basketball team
Players
Coaches

Pos.	#	Name	Height	Year	Previous school	Hometown
F	0	Abigayle Jackson	6 ft 3 in (1.91 m)	Sr	Little Rock Central; Auburn	Little Rock, AR
G	1	Taylor Woodhouse	5 ft 7 in (1.7 m)	Fr	Southaven	Southaven, MS
G	2	Lindsey Byers	5 ft 9 in (1.75 m)	Fr	Helias Catholic	Jefferson City, MO
F	4	Abby Hipp	6 ft 2 in (1.88 m)	Sr	St. Pius X	Kansas City, MO
G	11	Brice Calip	5 ft 8 in (1.73 m)	Sr	Sapulpa	Sapulpa, OK
F	12	Jennifer Ezeh	6 ft 3 in (1.91 m)	RS So	New Hope Academy	Nibo, Nigeria
F	13	Ifunanya Nwachukwu	6 ft 2 in (1.88 m)	Jr	Topfield College; Chipola College	Lagos, Nigeria
G	14	Mariah White	5 ft 8 in (1.73 m)	Sr	Start; Cleveland State	Toledo, OH
G	20	Isabelle Delarue	5 ft 11 in (1.8 m)	Fr	Francis Howell North	St. Charles, MO
G	21	Sydney Wilson	5 ft 11 in (1.8 m)	Sr	Olathe East	Overland Park, KS
G	22	Paige Rocca	5 ft 9 in (1.75 m)	So	Iowa City	Iowa City, IA
G	23	Mya Bhinhar	5 ft 9 in (1.75 m)	Sr	Owasso High School	Owasso, OK
F	32	Jasmine Franklin	6 ft 1 in (1.85 m)	Sr	Fayetteville	Fayetteville, AR

Head coach

- Amaka Agugua-Hamilton (Hofstra)

Assistant coach(es)

- Alysiah Bond (Ohio State)
- Tori Jankoska (Michigan State)
- CJ Jones (Francis Marion)

Legend

- (C) Team captain
- (S) Suspended
- (I) Ineligible
- (W) Walk-on
- Injured
- Current redshirt

Roster
Last update: May 25, 2022

== Schedule ==
Date time, TV	Rank^{#}	Opponent^{#}	Result	Record	Site (attendance) city, state
Exhibition
November 1, 2021*; 6:00 p.m.		Missouri Baptist	W 107–33	–	JQH Arena (1,447); Springfield, MO
November 5, 2021*; 6:00 p.m.		Lincoln	W 100–44	–	JQH Arena (1,524); Springfield, MO
Non-conference regular season
November 9, 2021*; 7:30 p.m., ESPN+		at Little Rock	W 76–62	1–0	Jack Stephens Center (1,743); Little Rock, AR
November 14, 2021*; 1:00 p.m., ESPN3		North Texas	W 56–50	2–0	JQH Arena (2,575); Springfield, MO
November 17, 2021*; 6:30 p.m.		at Oklahoma State	L 40–44	2–1	Gallagher-Iba Arena (1,577); Stillwater, OK
November 20, 2021*; 4:00 p.m.		at USC	W 67–41	3–1	Galen Center (372); Los Angeles, CA
November 26, 2021*; 9:00 a.m., FloHoops		vs. No. 24 Virginia Tech; San Juan Shootout	W 76–68	4–1	Roberto Clemente Coliseum (200); San Juan, Puerto Rico
November 27, 2021*; 11:15 a.m., FloHoops		vs. LSU; San Juan Shootout	L 58–66	4–2	Roberto Clemente Coliseum (200); San Juan, Puerto Rico
December 3, 2021*; 7:00 p.m.		William Jewell	W 81–26	5–2	JQH Arena (1,803); Springfield, MO
December 6, 2021*; 7:00 p.m., ESPN+		at South Dakota State	W 55–52	6–2	Frost Arena (1,149); Brookings, SD
December 10, 2021*; 7:00 p.m., ESPN+		Missouri	W 79–51	7–2	JQH Arena (5,288); Springfield, MO
December 18, 2021*; 2:00 p.m., ESPN3		Southern	W 72–43	8–2	JQH Arena (2,047); Springfield, MO
December 21, 2021*; 11:00 a.m., ESPN+		Toledo	W 60–46	9–2	JQH Arena (2,139); Springfield, MO
Missouri Valley Conference regular season
December 31, 2021; 2:00 p.m., ESPN+		Loyola Chicago	W 55–38	10–2 (1–0)	JQH Arena (1,877); Springfield, MO
January 2, 2022; 1:00 p.m., ESPN3		Valparaiso	W 74–62	11–2 (2–0)	JQH Arena (1,534); Springfield, MO
January 13, 2022; 6:00 p.m., ESPN+		at Northern Iowa	L 65–74	11–3 (2–1)	McLeod Center (739); Cedar Falls, IA
January 15, 2022; 2:00 p.m., ESPN+		at Drake	W 69–53	12–3 (3–1)	Knapp Center (1,903); Des Moines, IA
January 20, 2022; 7:00 p.m., ESPN+		Bradley	W 66–46	13–3 (4–1)	JQH Arena (1,662); Springfield, MO
January 22, 2022; 2:00 p.m., ESPN+		Illinois State	L 51–52	13–4 (4–2)	JQH Arena (2,036); Springfield, MO
January 27, 2022; 6:00 p.m.		at Evansville	W 82–35	14–4 (5–2)	Meeks Family Fieldhouse (325); Evansville, IN
January 29, 2022; Noon, ESPN+		at Indiana State	W 62–58	15–4 (6–2)	Hulman Center (1,139); Terre Haute, IN
February 4, 2022; 6:00 p.m., ESPN+		at Southern Illinois	L 49–65	15–5 (6–3)	SIU Arena (332); Carbondale, IL
February 6, 2022; 5:00 p.m.		Southern Illinois	W 53–52	16–5 (7–3)	JQH Arena (1,802); Springfield, MO
February 11, 2022; 7:00 p.m., ESPN+		Drake	W 63–59	17–5 (8–3)	JQH Arena (2,156); Springfield, MO
February 13, 2022; 2:00 p.m., ESPN+		Northern Iowa	W 66–57	18–5 (9–3)	JQH Arena (1,870); Springfield, MO
February 18, 2022; 6:00 p.m., ESPN+		at Illinois State	W 75–69	19–5 (10–3)	Redbird Arena (735); Normal, IL
February 20, 2022; 2:00 p.m., ESPN+		at Bradley	W 72–56	20–5 (11–3)	Renaissance Coliseum (328); Peoria, IL
February 24, 2022; 7:00 p.m., ESPN+		Evansville	W 99–57	21–5 (12–3)	JQH Arena (1,672); Springfield, MO
February 26, 2022; 2:00 p.m., ESPN+		Indiana State	W 72–65	22–5 (13–3)	JQH Arena (3,551); Springfield, MO
March 3, 2022; 2:00 p.m., ESPN+		at Valparaiso	W 66–46	23–5 (14–3)	Athletics–Recreation Center (278); Valparaiso, IN
March 5, 2022; 1:00 p.m., ESPN+		at Loyola Chicago	L 42–60	23–6 (14–4)	Joseph J. Gentile Arena (301); Chicago, IL
Missouri Valley tournament
March 11, 2022; 6:00 p.m., ESPN+	(2)	vs. (7) Drake; Quarterfinals	W 63–49	24–6	TaxSlayer Center (0); Moline, IL
March 12, 2022; 4:00 p.m., ESPN+	(2)	vs. (3) Northern Iowa; Semifinals	L 57–63	24–7	TaxSlayer Center (1,456); Moline, IL
NCAA tournament
March 17, 2022; 8:00 p.m., ESPN2	(11 S)	vs. (11 S) Florida State; First Four	W 61–50	25–7	Maravich Center (366); Baton Rouge, LA
March 19, 2022; 1:30 p.m., ESPNU	(11 S)	vs. (6 S) No. 14 Ohio State; First round	L 56–63	25–8	Maravich Center; Baton Rouge, LA
*Non-conference game. ^{#}Rankings from AP poll. (#) Tournament seedings in parentheses. S=Spokane. All times are in Central.

== Rankings ==
Ranking movements Legend: ██ Increase in ranking ██ Decrease in ranking — = Not ranked RV = Received votes
	Week																		
Poll	Pre	1	2	3	4	5	6	7	8	9	10	11	12	13	14	15	16	17	Final
AP	RV	—	RV	—	RV	—	—	RV	RV	—	RV	—	—	—	—	—	—	—	—
Coaches	RV	RV	RV	RV	RV	RV	RV	RV	RV	RV	RV	—	—	—	—	—	—	—	—

Legend
	Increase in ranking
	Decrease in ranking
	Not ranked previous week
(RV)	Received votes
(NR)	Not ranked and did not receive votes

The Coaches Poll did not release a Week 2 poll and the AP poll did not release a poll after the NCAA tournament.
