= 2021–22 Northern Iowa Panthers women's basketball team =

American college basketball season

2021–22 Northern Iowa Panthers women's basketball

WNIT, second round
- Conference: Missouri Valley Conference
- Record: 23–11 (13–5 MVC)
- Head coach: Tanya Warren (15th season)
- Associate head coach: Brad Nelson
- Assistant coaches: Steven Fennelly; Katelin Oney
- Home arena: McLeod Center

2021–22 Missouri Valley Conference women's basketball standings
	Conf.				Overall
Team	W		L	PCT	W		L	PCT
Southern Illinois	15	–	3	.833	21	–	10	.677
Missouri State	14	–	4	.778	25	–	8	.758
Northern Iowa	13	–	5	.722	23	–	11	.676
Illinois State †	12	–	6	.667	19	–	14	.576
Loyola Chicago	10	–	8	.556	18	–	12	.600
Valparaiso	9	–	9	.500	11	–	19	.367
Drake	9	–	9	.500	20	–	14	.588
Indiana State	5	–	13	.278	11	–	20	.355
Evansville	2	–	16	.111	8	–	22	.267
Bradley	1	–	17	.056	4	–	24	.143
† 2022 MVC tournament winner

The 2021–22 Northern Iowa Panthers women's basketball team represented the University of Northern Iowa during the 2021–22 NCAA Division I women's basketball season. The Panthers were led by head coach Tanya Warren in her fifteenth season, and played their home games at the McLeod Center in Cedar Falls, Iowa as a member of the Missouri Valley Conference (MVC).

The Panthers finished the season with a 23–11 record, including 13–5 in MVC play. They received a bid to the 2022 Women's National Invitation Tournament, where they advanced to the second round, in which they were defeated by Drake.

== Previous season ==
The Panthers finished the 2020–21 season with a 17–13 record, including 11–7 in MVC play. They received a bid to the 2021 Women's National Invitation Tournament, where they advanced to the Final Four.

== Offseason ==
=== Departures ===
Name	Number	Pos.	Height	Year	Hometown	Reason for departure
Megan Maahs	50	F	6' 1"	RS Senior	Epworth, IA	Graduated

=== 2021 recruiting class ===
College recruiting information
Name	Hometown	School	Height	Weight	Commit date
Riley Wright; G	Marion, IA	Marion	5 ft 11 in (1.80 m)	N/A	Jul 1, 2019
Riley Wright; G	Recruit ratings: Scout: Rivals: (90)				
Anaya Barney; G	Cedar Falls, IA	Cedar Falls	5 ft 11 in (1.80 m)	N/A	Jul 13, 2019
Anaya Barney; G	Recruit ratings: Scout: Rivals: (N/A)				
Overall recruit ranking:
Note: In many cases, Scout, Rivals, 247Sports, On3, and ESPN may conflict in their listings of height and weight.; In these cases, the average was taken. ESPN grades are on a 100-point scale.; Sources: "2021 Team Ranking". Rivals.

== Roster ==
2021–22 Northern Iowa Panthers women's basketball team
Players
Coaches

Pos.	#	Name	Height	Year	Previous school	Hometown
G	0	Maya McDermott	5 ft 6 in (1.68 m)	Fr	Johnston	Johnston, IA
G	1	Anaya Barney	5 ft 11 in (1.8 m)	Fr	Cedar Falls	Cedar Falls, IA
G	2	Cailyn Morgan	5 ft 10 in (1.78 m)	So	Iowa City West	Coralville, IA
G	3	Karli Rucker	5 ft 6 in (1.68 m)	Sr	North Scott	Eldridge, IA
G	4	Emerson Green	5 ft 10 in (1.78 m)	Fr	Cedar Falls	Cedar Falls, IA
G	5	Nicole Kroeger	5 ft 9 in (1.75 m)	Sr	Palmyra	Palmyra, MO
F	11	Bre Gunnels	6 ft 1 in (1.85 m)	Sr	Southeast	Kansas City, MO
G	12	Kam Finley	5 ft 9 in (1.75 m)	Jr	Cedar Falls	Cedar Falls, IA
G	14	Riley Wright	5 ft 11 in (1.8 m)	Fr	Marion	Marion, IA
C	21	Taryn McKee	6 ft 3 in (1.91 m)	Fr	Van Buren Community	Keosauqua, IA
G	24	Kayba Laube	5 ft 9 in (1.75 m)	Fr	Marion	Marion, IA
F	25	Sara McCullough	6 ft 0 in (1.83 m)	RS Fr	Ankeny	Ankeny, IA
C	30	Cynthia Wolf	6 ft 3 in (1.91 m)	Jr	Cedar Falls	Cedar Falls, IA
F	33	Kiana Barney	6 ft 1 in (1.85 m)	RS So	Cedar Falls	Cedar Falls, IA
F	42	Grace Boffeli	6 ft 1 in (1.85 m)	Fr	North Scott	Eldridge, IA

Head coach

- Tanya Warren (Creighton)

Assistant coach(es)

- Brad Nelson (Oregon)
- Steven Fennelly (Iowa State)
- Katelin Oney (Northern Iowa)

Legend

- (C) Team captain
- (S) Suspended
- (I) Ineligible
- (W) Walk-on
- Injured
- Current redshirt

Roster
Last update: March 15, 2022

== Schedule and results ==
Date time, TV	Rank^{#}	Opponent^{#}	Result	Record	High points	High rebounds	High assists	Site (attendance) city, state
Exhibition
November 2, 2021*; 6:00 p.m.		Truman	W 83–58	–	14 – 2 tied	8 – Gunnels	7 – Rucker	McLeod Center; Cedar Falls, IA
Non-conference regular season
November 9, 2021*; 4:00 p.m., ESPN+		at Saint Louis	W 63–54	1–0	17 – Rucker	11 – Wolf	3 – Gunnels	Chaifetz Arena (402); St. Louis, MO
November 14, 2021*; 2:00 p.m., ESPN+		No. 9 Iowa	L 61–82	1–1	17 – Finley	8 – Gunnels	4 – McDermott	McLeod Center (3,095); Cedar Falls, IA
November 17, 2021*; 7:00 p.m., ESPN+		at North Dakota State	W 76–63	2–1	27 – Rucker	8 – Boffeli	4 – Rucker	Scheels Center (504); Fargo, ND
November 20, 2021*; 11:00 a.m.		Witchita State	W 87–55	3–1	16 – Kroeger	8 – Boffeli	5 – Green	McLeod Center (497); Cedar Falls, IA
November 27, 2021*; 1:00 p.m., FloSports		at Creighton	L 72–79	3–2	20 – Rucker	11 – Boffeli	5 – 2 tied	D. J. Sokol Arena (792); Omaha, NE
December 1, 2021*; 7:00 p.m.		at St. Thomas (MN)	W 102–62	4–2	17 – Green	11 – Wolf	10 – McDermott	Schoenecker Arena (375); Saint Paul, MN
December 4, 2021*; 2:00 p.m., ESPN+		South Dakota State	W 59–50	5–2	13 – Finley	8 – Wolf	3 – Wolf	McLeod Center (636); Cedar Falls, IA
December 6, 2021*; 6:00 p.m., ESPN3		Graceland	W 110–34	6–2	15 – 2 tied	7 – Wolf	7 – McDermott	McLeod Center (668); Cedar Falls, IA
December 12, 2021*; 5:00 p.m., ESPN+		at No. 15 Iowa State	L 69–70	6–3	28 – Finley	8 – Boffeli	6 – Rucker	Hilton Coliseum (9,726); Ames, IA
December 18, 2021*; 9:00 p.m.		vs. Idaho; Maui Classic	W 75–64	7–3	21 – Rucker	19 – Boffeli	5 – Rucker	Lahaina Civic Center (212); Lahaina, HI
December 19, 2021*; 7:00 p.m.		vs. Oregon State; Maui Classic	L 59–70	7–4	17 – Rucker	9 – Gunnels	3 – Rucker	Lahaina Civic Center (415); Lahaina, HI
Missouri Valley Conference regular season
January 7, 2022; 6:00 p.m., ESPN3		at Valparaiso	L 58–60	7–5 (0–1)	13 – Boffeli	12 – Boffeli	8 – Rucker	Athletics-Recreation Center (179); Valparaiso, IN
January 9, 2022; 1:00 p.m., ESPN3		at Loyola Chicago	W 58–54	8–5 (1–1)	16 – Rucker	9 – Boffeli	4 – Rucker	Joseph J. Gentile Arena (203); Chicago, IL
January 13, 2022; 6:00 p.m., ESPN+		Missouri State	W 74–65	9–5 (2–1)	19 – Rucker	14 – Boffeli	4 – Boffeli	McLeod Center (739); Cedar Falls, IA
January 15, 2022; 2:00 p.m., ESPN3		Southern Illinois	W 66–57	10–5 (3–1)	18 – Rucker	7 – Gunnels	3 – 2 tied	McLeod Center (837); Cedar Falls, IA
January 21, 2022; 6:00 p.m., ESPN+		at Drake	L 57–65	10–6 (3–2)	12 – Rucker	10 – Boffeli	4 – 2 tied	Knapp Center (2,300); Des Moines, IA
January 27, 2022; 6:00 p.m., ESPN+		at Illinois State	W 74–67	11–6 (4–2)	16 – Kroeger	8 – Kroeger	5 – 2 tied	Redbird Arena (824); Normal, IL
January 29, 2022; 2:00 p.m., ESPN+		at Bradley	W 60–36	12–6 (5–2)	14 – Boffeli	10 – Boffeli	3 – Rucker	Renaissance Coliseum (322); Peoria, IL
February 2, 2022; 4:00 p.m., ESPN+		Indiana State	W 72–49	13–6 (6–2)	15 – Finley	11 – Boffeli	4 – Gunnels	McLeod Center (821); Cedar Falls, IA
February 4, 2022; 6:00 p.m., ESPN+		Loyola Chicago	W 69–56	14–6 (7–2)	14 – 2 tied	18 – Boffeli	3 – 3 tied	McLeod Center (867); Cedar Falls, IA
February 6, 2022; 2:00 p.m., ESPN+		Valparaiso	W 68–38	15–6 (8–2)	14 – Rucker	14 – Boffeli	4 – McDermott	McLeod Center (1,099); Cedar Falls, IA
February 8, 2022; 6:00 p.m., ESPN+		Evansville	W 78–58	16–6 (9–2)	20 – Gunnels	12 – Wolf	3 – Kroeger	McLeod Center; Cedar Falls, IA
February 11, 2022; 6:00 p.m., ESPN+		at Southern Illinois	L 60–64	16–7 (9–3)	25 – Rucker	6 – Wolf	4 – Rucker	Banterra Center (418); Carbondale, IL
February 13, 2022; 2:00 p.m., ESPN+		at Missouri State	L 57–66	16–8 (9–4)	14 – 2 tied	8 – Gunnels	3 – Kroeger	JQH Arena (1,870); Springfield, MO
February 19, 2022; 2:00 p.m., ESPN3		Drake	L 68–73	16–9 (9–5)	19 – Rucker	10 – Boffeli	4 – Laube	McLeod Center (1,374); Cedar Falls, IA
February 25, 2022; 6:00 p.m., ESPN+		Bradley	W 77–56	17–9 (10–5)	15 – Finley	12 – Wolf	5 – McDermott	McLeod Center (1,701); Cedar Falls, IA
February 27, 2022; 2:00 p.m., ESPN+		Illinois State	W 70–63	18–9 (11–5)	19 – Gunnels	11 – Boffeli	5 – Rucker	McLeod Center (1,333); Cedar Falls, IA
March 3, 2022; 2:00 p.m., ESPN+		at Indiana State	W 61–55	19–9 (12–5)	22 – Rucker	11 – Boffeli	4 – Wolf	Hulman Center (1,102); Terre Haute, IN
March 5, 2022; 1:00 p.m., ESPN+		at Evansville	W 83–56	20–9 (13–5)	14 – 2 tied	6 – McCullough	3 – 3 tied	Meeks Family Fieldhouse (208); Evansville, IN
MVC tournament
March 11, 2022; 8:30 p.m., ESPN+	(3)	vs. (6) Valparaiso; Quarterfinals	W 63–39	21–9	16 – Finley	15 – Gunnels	3 – Rucker	TaxSlayer Center; Moline, IL
March 12, 2022; 4:00 p.m., ESPN+	(3)	vs. (2) Missouri State; Semifinals	W 63–57	22–9	18 – Rucker	9 – Boffeli	5 – Rucker	TaxSlayer Center (1,456); Moline, IL
March 13, 2022; 1:00 p.m., ESPNU	(3)	vs. (4) Illinois State; Championship	L 48–50	22–10	16 – Rucker	8 – Gunnels	4 – Rucker	TaxSlayer Center (1,392); Moline, IL
Women's National Invitation Tournament
March 17, 2022; 6:00 p.m., ESPN+		Kansas City; First round	W 75–58	23–10	19 – Finley	6 – 2 tied	4 – 2 tied	McLeod Center (1,074); Cedar Falls, IA
March 21, 2022; 6:00 p.m., ESPN+		at Drake; Second round	L 55–62	23–11	11 – Finley	13 – Boffeli	3 – 2 tied	Knapp Center (2,037); Des Moines, IA
*Non-conference game. ^{#}Rankings from AP poll. (#) Tournament seedings in parentheses. All times are in Central.
