= Evansville Purple Aces women's basketball =

Evansville Purple Aces
2026–27 Evansville Purple Aces women's basketball team
- University: University of Evansville
- Head coach: Ben Wierzba (1st season)
- Location: Evansville, Indiana
- Arena: Meeks Family Fieldhouse (capacity: 1,800)
- Conference: Missouri Valley
- Nickname: Purple Aces
- Colors: Purple, white, and orange

NCAA Division I tournament appearances
- 1999, 2009

Conference tournament champions
- 1999, 2009

Conference regular-season champions
- 2008

Uniforms
Home	Away	Alternate

The Evansville Purple Aces women's basketball team represents the Purple Aces of the University of Evansville, located in Evansville, Indiana, in NCAA Division I basketball competition. They play in the Missouri Valley Conference.

== History ==
Evansville began play in 1969. The Purple Aces have (as of the end of the 2015–16 season) an all-time record of 484–650. They played in the North Star Conference from 1983 to 1986 and the Midwestern Collegiate from 1986 to 1994 before joining the Missouri Valley Conference in 1994. They made the NCAA Tournament in 1999 and 2009, losing in the First Round each time. They have won the MVC Tournament twice (1999, 2009), winning the latter after finishing the regular season 15–19. They have made the WNIT in 2000 and 2008, getting to the Second Round in the latter year. They have made one appearance in the Women's Basketball Invitational (2014).

== NCAA tournament results ==
Year	Seed	Round	Opponent	Result
1999	#13	First Round	#4 LSU	L 69−78
2009	#15	First Round	#2 Texas A&M	L 45−80
