= 2022 Missouri Valley Conference women's basketball tournament =

- Classification: Division I
- Season: 2021–22
- Teams: 10
- Site: TaxSlayer Center; Moline, Illinois
- Champions: Illinois State (5th title)
- Winning coach: Kristen Gillespie (1st title)
- MVP: JuJu Redmond (Illinois State)
- Television: ESPN+, ESPNU

2021–22 Missouri Valley Conference women's basketball standings
| | Conf. | | | | Overall |
| Team | W | | L | PCT | W | | L | PCT |
|---|---|---|---|---|---|---|---|---|
| Southern Illinois | 15 | – | 3 | .833 | 21 | – | 10 | .677 |
| Missouri State | 14 | – | 4 | .778 | 25 | – | 8 | .758 |
| Northern Iowa | 13 | – | 5 | .722 | 23 | – | 11 | .676 |
| Illinois State † | 12 | – | 6 | .667 | 19 | – | 14 | .576 |
| Loyola Chicago | 10 | – | 8 | .556 | 18 | – | 12 | .600 |
| Valparaiso | 9 | – | 9 | .500 | 11 | – | 19 | .367 |
| Drake | 9 | – | 9 | .500 | 20 | – | 14 | .588 |
| Indiana State | 5 | – | 13 | .278 | 11 | – | 20 | .355 |
| Evansville | 2 | – | 16 | .111 | 8 | – | 22 | .267 |
| Bradley | 1 | – | 17 | .056 | 4 | – | 24 | .143 |
† 2022 MVC tournament winner

The 2022 Missouri Valley Conference women's basketball tournament, promoted as Hoops in the Heartland, was part of the 2021–22 NCAA Division I women's basketball season and was played in Moline, Illinois, March 10–13, 2022, at the TaxSlayer Center.

== Seeds ==
2022 MVC Women's Basketball Tournament seeds
| Seed | School | Conf. | Over. | Tiebreaker |
| 1 | Southern Illinois ‡# | 15–3 | 20–8 | |
| 2 | Missouri State# | 14–4 | 23–6 | |
| 3 | Northern Iowa# | 13–5 | 20–9 | |
| 4 | Illinois State | 12–6 | 16–13 | |
| 5 | Loyola-Chicago# | 10–8 | 18–11 | |
| 6 | Valparaiso# | 9–9 | 11–18 | 2–0 vs. Drake |
| 7 | Drake | 9–9 | 17–12 | 0–2 vs. Valparaiso |
| 8 | Indiana State | 5–13 | 10–19 | |
| 9 | Evansville | 2–16 | 8–21 | |
| 10 | Bradley | 1–17 | 4–23 | |
‡ – Missouri Valley Conference regular season champions, and tournament No. 1 seed. # - Received a single-bye in the conference tournament. Overall records include all games played in the Missouri Valley Conference tournament.

== Schedule ==
| Session | Game | Time | Matchup | Score | Television |
First round – Thursday, March 10
| 1 | 1 | 4:00 pm | No. 8 Indiana State vs. No. 9 Evansville | 89-75 | ESPN+ |
| 1 | 2 | 7:00 pm | No. 7 Drake vs. No. 10 Bradley | 71-56 | ESPN+ |
Quarterfinals – Friday, March 11
| 2 | 3 | Noon | No. 1 Southern Illinois vs. No. 8 Indiana State | 77-61 | ESPN+ |
| 2 | 4 | 2:30 pm | No. 4 Illinois State vs. No. 5 Loyola-Chicago | 68-52 | ESPN+ |
| 3 | 5 | 6:00 pm | No. 2 Missouri State vs. No. 7 Drake | 63-49 | ESPN+ |
| 3 | 6 | 8:30 pm | No. 3 Northern Iowa vs. No. 6 Valparaiso | 63-39 | ESPN+ |
Semifinals – Saturday, March 12
| 4 | 7 | 1:30 pm | No. 1 Southern Illinois vs. No. 4 Illinois State | 42-50 | ESPN+ |
| 4 | 8 | 4:00 pm | No. 2 Missouri State vs. No. 3 Northern Iowa | 57-63 | ESPN+ |
Championship – Sunday, March 13
| 5 | 9 | 1:00 pm | No. 4 Illinois State vs. No. 3 Northern Iowa | 50–48 | ESPNU |
Game times in CT. Rankings denote tournament seed.

== Tournament bracket ==
First round Thursday, March 10; ESPN+
8 | Indiana State | 89
9 | Evansville | 75
7 | Drake | 71
10 | Bradley | 56

Quarterfinals; Friday, March 11; ESPN+
1 | Southern Illinois | 77
8 | Indiana State | 61
4 | Illinois State | 68
5 | Loyola-Chicago | 52
2 | Missouri State | 63
7 | Drake | 49
3 | Northern Iowa | 63
6 | Valparaiso | 39

Semifinals; Saturday, March 12; ESPN+
1 | Southern Illinois | 42
4 | Illinois State | 50
2 | Missouri State | 57
3 | Northern Iowa | 63

Championship; Sunday, March 13; ESPNU
4 | Illinois State | 50
3 | Northern Iowa | 48

* denotes overtime

== See also ==
- 2022 Missouri Valley Conference men's basketball tournament
