= 2022 CAA women's basketball tournament =

- Classification: Division I
- Season: 2021–22
- Teams: 9
- Site: Daskalakis Athletic Center; Philadelphia, Pennsylvania
- Champions: Delaware (3rd title)
- Winning coach: Natasha Adair (1st title)
- MVP: Jasmine Dickey (Delaware)
- Top scorer: Jasmine Dickey (Delaware) (78 points)
- Television: FloHoops
- CAA women's basketball tournaments

2021–22 CAA women's basketball standings
	Conf.				Overall
Team	W		L	PCT	W		L	PCT
Drexel	16	–	2	.889	28	–	6	.824
Delaware †	15	–	3	.833	25	–	7	.781
Towson	14	–	4	.778	24	–	8	.750
James Madison*	10	–	8	.556	14	–	15	.483
Elon	9	–	9	.500	17	–	12	.586
Charleston	9	–	9	.500	18	–	13	.581
Northeastern	8	–	10	.444	14	–	18	.438
William & Mary	5	–	13	.278	10	–	20	.333
Hofstra	4	–	14	.222	8	–	20	.286
UNC Wilmington	0	–	18	.000	3	–	26	.103
† 2022 CAA tournament winner *Ineligible for the CAA Tournament due to a postseason ban imposed by the CAA.

The 2022 Colonial Athletic Association women's basketball tournament is a postseason women's basketball tournament for the Colonial Athletic Association for the 2021–22 NCAA Division I women's basketball season. The tournament was held from March 10–13, 2022 at the Daskalakis Athletic Center in Philadelphia, Pennsylvania.

== Seeds ==
Seed	School	Conf.	Tiebreaker 1	Tiebreaker 2
1	Drexel	16–2		
2	Delaware	15–3		
3	Towson	14–4		
4	Elon	9–9	2–0 vs Charleston	
5	Charleston	9–9	0–2 vs Elon	
6	Northeastern	8–10		
7	William & Mary	5–13		
8	Hofstra	4–14		
9	UNC Wilmington	0–18		

== Schedule ==
Session	Game	Time*	Matchup	Score	Television
First round – Thursday, March 10
1	1	2:00 pm	No. 8 Hofstra vs. No. 9 UNC Wilmington	46–45	FloHoops
Quarterfinals – Friday, March 11
2	2	12:00 pm	No. 1 Drexel vs. No. 8 Hofstra	60–39	FloHoops
2	3	2:30 pm	No. 4 Elon vs. No. 5 Charleston	59–70	FloHoops
3	4	5:00 pm	No. 2 Delaware vs. No. 7 William & Mary	61–35	FloHoops
3	5	7:30 pm	No. 3 Towson vs. No. 6 Northeastern	58-49	FloHoops
Semifinals – Saturday, March 12
4	6	1:00 pm	No. 1 Drexel vs. No. 5 Charleston	71-65	FloHoops
4	7	3:30 pm	No. 2 Delaware vs. No. 3 Towson	56-55	FloHoops
Championship – Sunday, March 13
5	8	1:00 pm	No. 1 Drexel vs. No. 2 Delaware	63–59	FloHoops
*Game times in ET. Rankings denote tournament seed

== Bracket ==
First round Thursday, March 10; FloHoops
8	Hofstra	46
9	UNC Wilmington	45

Quarterfinals; Friday, March 11; FloHoops
1	Drexel	60
8	Hofstra	39
4	Elon	59
5	Charleston	70
2	Delaware	61
7	William & Mary	35
3	Towson	58
6	Northeastern	49

Semifinals; Saturday, March 12; FloHoops
1	Drexel	71
5	Charleston	65
2	Delaware	56
3	Towson	55

Final; Sunday, March 13; FloHoops
1	Drexel	59
2	Delaware	63

* denotes overtime game

== See also ==
- 2022 CAA men's basketball tournament
