= 2021–22 James Madison Dukes women's basketball team =

Intercollegiate basketball season

2021–22 James Madison Dukes women's basketball
- Conference: Colonial Athletic Association
- Record: 14–15 (10–8 CAA)
- Head coach: Sean O'Regan (6th season)
- Assistant coaches: Ian Caskill; Samantha Prahalis-Holmes; Kachine Alexander
- Home arena: Atlantic Union Bank Center

2021–22 CAA women's basketball standings
	Conf.				Overall
Team	W		L	PCT	W		L	PCT
Drexel	16	–	2	.889	28	–	6	.824
Delaware †	15	–	3	.833	25	–	7	.781
Towson	14	–	4	.778	24	–	8	.750
James Madison*	10	–	8	.556	14	–	15	.483
Elon	9	–	9	.500	17	–	12	.586
Charleston	9	–	9	.500	18	–	13	.581
Northeastern	8	–	10	.444	14	–	18	.438
William & Mary	5	–	13	.278	10	–	20	.333
Hofstra	4	–	14	.222	8	–	20	.286
UNC Wilmington	0	–	18	.000	3	–	26	.103
† 2022 CAA tournament winner *Ineligible for the CAA Tournament due to a postseason ban imposed by the CAA.

The 2021–22 James Madison Dukes women's basketball team represented James Madison University during the 2021–22 NCAA Division I women's basketball season. The Dukes, led by sixth-year head coach Sean O'Regan, played their home games at the Atlantic Union Bank Center in Harrisonburg, Virginia as members of the Colonial Athletic Association (CAA). They finished the season 14–15, 10–8 in CAA play, to finish in fourth place in the conference standings. As this was their last season in the CAA, the conference banned all athletic teams at JMU, including women's basketball, from participating in all post-season play.

== Roster ==
2021–22 James Madison Dukes women's basketball team
Players
Coaches

Pos.	#	Name	Height	Year	Previous school	Hometown
G	0	Peyton McDaniel	6 ft 0 in (1.83 m)	So	Twin Valley HS	Birdsboro, PA
G	2	Jaylin Carodine	5 ft 10 in (1.78 m)	Sr	St. John's College HS	Bowie, MD
G	3	Brianna Tinsley (redshirt)	5 ft 7 in (1.7 m)	Sr	St. Anne's-Belfield; Virginia	Madison, VA
G	4	Madison Green	5 ft 6 in (1.68 m)	Sr	Millbrook HS	Winchester, VA
G	5	Bailey Williams	5 ft 7 in (1.7 m)	Fr	Cosby HS	Midlothian, VA
F	11	Claire Neff	6 ft 2 in (1.88 m)	So	Maryvale Prep	Bel Air, MD
F	12	Sherese Pittman	6 ft 1 in (1.85 m)	Fr	Steward	Richmond, VA
F	14	Annalicia Goodman	6 ft 3 in (1.91 m)	So	Heritage HS	Newport News, VA
G	15	Amira Williams	5 ft 11 in (1.8 m)	So	Winston-Salem Christian; College of Charleston	Winston-Salem, NC
F	23	Mikaya Tynes	6 ft 1 in (1.85 m)	Fr	Norview HS	Norfolk, VA
G	25	Jamia Hazell	5 ft 8 in (1.73 m)	So	Southeast Raleigh HS	Raleigh, NC
G	30	Kiki Jefferson	6 ft 1 in (1.85 m)	Jr	Lancaster HS	Lancaster, PA
F	32	Abby Oguich	5 ft 11 in (1.8 m)	Jr	Monacan HS; Lynchburg	Midlothian, VA
F	33	Steph Ouderkirk	6 ft 1 in (1.85 m)	So	Spotswood HS	Penn Laird, VA
C	35	Kseniia Kozlova (redshirt)	6 ft 4 in (1.93 m)	Fr	Montverde; Middle Tennessee	Moscow, Russia
F		Casey Irvine	6 ft 1 in (1.85 m)	Sr	Spotswood HS	Penn Laird, VA
F		Morgan Smith	6 ft 0 in (1.83 m)	Sr	Riverdale Baptist; Georgetown	Upper Marlboro, MD

Head coach

- Sean O'Regan (James Madison)

Assistant coach(es)

- Ian Caskill (James Madison)
- Samantha Prahalis-Holmes (Ohio State)
- Kachine Alexander (Concordia-St. Paul)

Legend

- (C) Team captain
- (S) Suspended
- (I) Ineligible
- (W) Walk-on
- Injured
- Current redshirt

Roster
Last update: December 27, 2022

== Schedule and results ==
Date time, TV	Rank^{#}	Opponent^{#}	Result	Record	High points	High rebounds	High assists	Site (attendance) city, state
Exhibition
November 1, 2021*; 7:00 p.m.		Shepherd	W 74–46		–	–	–	Atlantic Union Bank Center; Harrisonburg, VA
Non-conference regular season
November 9, 2021*; 7:00 p.m., FloSports		Virginia	W 84–69	1–0	31 – Jefferson	11 – Jefferson	3 – Green	Atlantic Union Bank Center (3,766); Harrisonburg, VA
November 14, 2021*; 2:00 p.m., FloSports		No. 4 Maryland	L 45–81	1–1	16 – Jefferson	7 – Goodman	2 – 3 tied	Atlantic Union Bank Center (2,887); Harrisonburg, VA
November 18, 2021*; 7:00 p.m., ESPN+		at Liberty	L 61–66 ^{OT}	1–2	21 – Jefferson	8 – Jefferson	2 – 2 tied	Liberty Arena (906); Lynchburg, VA
November 21, 2021*; 2:00 p.m., FloSports		Hampton	W 78–60	2–2	16 – Hazell	12 – Ouderkirk	4 – Hazell	Atlantic Union Bank Center (2,207); Harrisonburg, VA
November 24, 2021*; 2:00 p.m., FloSports		North Carolina Central	W 77–54	3–2	23 – Jefferson	15 – Carodine	2 – 3 tied	Atlantic Union Bank Center (2,135); Harrisonburg, VA
November 27, 2021*; 2:00 p.m., ESPN3		at Buffalo	L 45–62	3–3	13 – Jefferson	9 – Carodine	3 – 2 tied	Alumni Arena (1,164); Buffalo, NY
December 2, 2021*; 7:00 p.m., ESPN+		at George Washington	L 50–54	3–4	20 – Jefferson	12 – Carodine	2 – Neff	Charles E. Smith Center (255); Washington, DC
December 5, 2021*; 2:00 p.m., ACCNX		at North Carolina	L 47–93	3–5	20 – Hazell	9 – Carodine	2 – Tinsley	Carmichael Arena (1,456); Chapel Hill, NC
December 9, 2021*; 7:00 p.m., NBCSN Washington		Villanova	L 67–76	3–6	25 – Jefferson	15 – Carodine	2 – Jefferson	Atlantic Union Bank Center (2,336); Harrisonburg, VA
December 12, 2021*; 2:00 p.m., FloSports		West Virginia	L 68–75 ^{OT}	3–7	19 – Hazell	12 – Carodine	2 – 2 tied	Atlantic Union Bank Center (2,606); Harrisonburg, VA
December 20, 2021*; 3:00 p.m., ESPN+		at George Mason	W 69–61	4–7	21 – Jefferson	15 – Carodine	3 – Tinsley	EagleBank Arena (859); Fairfax, VA
Conference regular season
January 7, 2022; 7:00 p.m., FloSports		William & Mary	W 67–39	5–7 (1–0)	16 – Goodman	12 – Goodman	4 – 2 tied	Atlantic Union Bank Center (2,085); Harrisonburg, VA
January 9, 2022; 1:00 p.m., FloSports		Elon	W 59–57	6–7 (2–0)	22 – Jefferson	11 – Goodman	5 – Green	Atlantic Union Bank Center (2,173); Harrisonburg, VA
January 16, 2022; 2:00 p.m., FloSports		at Towson	L 70–79	6–8 (2–1)	19 – Jefferson	15 – Carodine	4 – Tinsley	SECU Arena (421); Towson, MD
January 18, 2022; 6:00 p.m., FloSports		at Delaware	L 57–64	6–9 (2–2)	26 – Jefferson	14 – Carodine	2 – Jefferson	Bob Carpenter Center (790); Newark, DE
January 21, 2022; 2:00 p.m., FloSports		at UNC Wilmington	W 57–56	7–9 (3–2)	20 – Jefferson	9 – Carodine	5 – Hazell	Trask Coliseum (418); Wilmington, NC
January 23, 2022; 2:00 p.m., FloSports		at College of Charleston	W 64–55	8–9 (4–2)	17 – Carodine	16 – Carodine	3 – Hazell	TD Arena (381); Charleston, SC
January 28, 2022; 7:00 p.m., NBCSN Washington		Hofstra	W 65–53	9–9 (5–2)	19 – Jefferson	9 – Jefferson	4 – Jefferson	Atlantic Union Bank Center (2,272); Harrisonburg, VA
January 30, 2022; 2:00 p.m., FloSports		Northeastern	L 50–62	9–10 (5–3)	20 – Jefferson	12 – Carodine	3 – Jefferson	Atlantic Union Bank Center (2,547); Harrisonburg, VA
February 4, 2022; 7:00 p.m., FloSports		at Elon	W 71–56	10–10 (6–3)	19 – Jefferson	19 – Carodine	4 – Jefferson	Schar Center (742); Elon, NC
February 6, 2022; 2:00 p.m., FloSports		at William & Mary	W 64–58	11–10 (7–3)	32 – Jefferson	9 – Goodman	3 – Carodine	Kaplan Arena (627); Williamsburg, VA
February 13, 2022; 2:00 p.m., NBCSN Washington		Towson	L 67–87	11–11 (7–4)	21 – Green	5 – Jefferson	4 – Hazell	Atlantic Union Bank Center (2,346); Harrisonburg, VA
February 16, 2022; 5:00 p.m., FloSports		at Drexel	L 61–64	11–12 (7–5)	17 – Green	12 – Carodine	6 – Jefferson	Daskalakis Athletic Center (498); Philadelphia, PA
February 18, 2022; 12:00 p.m., FloSports		College of Charleston	L 69–71	11–13 (7–6)	20 – Jefferson	14 – Carodine	3 – 2 tied	Atlantic Union Bank Center (2,067); Harrisonburg, VA
February 20, 2022; 2:00 p.m., NBCSN Washington		UNC Wilmington	W 73–51	12–13 (8–6)	21 – Jefferson	7 – Carodine	6 – Tinsley	Atlantic Union Bank Center (2,979); Harrisonburg, VA
February 25, 2022; 6:00 p.m., FloSports		at Northeastern	L 52–65	12–14 (8–7)	13 – Ouderkirk	14 – Carodine	3 – Jefferson	Cabot Center (279); Boston, MA
February 27, 2022; 2:00 p.m., FloSports		at Hofstra	W 68–63	13–14 (9–7)	23 – Jefferson	12 – Carodine	4 – Jefferson	Mack Sports Complex (800); Hempstead, NY
March 3, 2022; 7:00 p.m., NBCSN Washington		Drexel	L 60–80	13–15 (9–8)	22 – Jefferson	6 – 2 tied	3 – Jefferson	Atlantic Union Bank Center (2,549); Harrisonburg, VA
March 5, 2022; 4:00 p.m., NBCSN Washington		Delaware	W 78–62	14–15 (10–8)	20 – Jefferson	17 – Carodine	3 – 2 tied	Atlantic Union Bank Center (2,705); Harrisonburg, VA
*Non-conference game. ^{#}Rankings from AP poll. (#) Tournament seedings in parentheses. All times are in Eastern.

== See also ==
- 2021–22 James Madison Dukes men's basketball team
