= 2021–22 Big Ten Conference women's basketball season =

- League: NCAA Division I
- Sport: Basketball
- Teams: 14
- TV partner(s): Big Ten Network, ESPN, Fox, FS1

2020–21 NCAA Division I women's basketball season
- Season champions: Iowa & Ohio State
- Season MVP: Caitlin Clark, Iowa

Tournament
- Champions: Iowa
- Runners-up: Indiana
- Finals MVP: Caitlin Clark

Basketball seasons
- ← 2020–21 2022–23 →

2021–22 Big Ten women's basketball standings
	Conf.				Overall
Team	W		L	PCT	W		L	PCT
No. 14 Ohio State	14	–	4	.778	25	–	7	.781
No. 8 Iowa †	14	–	4	.778	24	–	8	.750
No. 12 Michigan	13	–	4	.765	25	–	7	.781
No. 13 Maryland	13	–	4	.765	23	–	9	.719
No. 11 Indiana	11	–	5	.688	24	–	9	.727
Nebraska	11	–	7	.611	24	–	9	.727
Northwestern	8	–	8	.500	17	–	12	.586
Michigan State	8	–	9	.471	15	–	15	.500
Purdue	7	–	11	.389	17	–	15	.531
Minnesota	7	–	11	.389	15	–	18	.455
Penn State	5	–	13	.278	11	–	18	.379
Wisconsin	5	–	13	.278	8	–	21	.276
Rutgers	3	–	14	.176	11	–	20	.355
Illinois	1	–	13	.071	7	–	20	.259
† 2022 Big Ten tournament winner Rankings from AP poll

The 2021–22 Big Ten women's basketball season was expected to begin with practices in October 2021, followed by the start of the 2021–22 NCAA Division I women's basketball season in November 2021. The regular season ended in March, 2022.

== Regular season ==
The conference schedule was released on September 8.

=== Records against other conferences ===
2021–22 records against non-conference foes as of (January 2, 2022):

Regular season

Power 7 Conferences	Record
American	3–0
ACC	7–13
Big East	5–3
Big 12	2–5
Pac-12	2–4
SEC	2–4
Power 7 Conferences total	21–29
Other NCAA Division I conferences	Record
America East	3–2
A-10	2–3
ASUN	3–2
Big Sky	0–0
Big South	1–0
Big West	2–0
CAA	5–0
C-USA	4–1
Horizon	6–3
Ivy League	1–0
MAAC	6–0
MAC	8–1
MEAC	6–0
MVC	10–3
Mountain West	3–0
NEC	7–1
OVC	1–1
Patriot League	2–0
SoCon	1–0
Southland	0–0
SWAC	4–0
Summit	3–0
Sun Belt	1–0
WAC	0–1
WCC	1–0
Other Division I total	80–18
Division II total	0–0
NCAA Division I total	100–47

Preseason

Power 7 Conferences	Record
American	0–0
ACC	0–0
Big East	0–0
Big 12	0–0
Pac-12	0–0
SEC	0–0
Power 7 Conferences total	0–0
Other NCAA Division I Conferences	Record
America East	0–0
A-10	0–0
ASUN	0–0
Big Sky	0–0
Big South	0–0
Big West	0–0
CAA	0–0
C-USA	0–0
Horizon	0–0
Ivy League	0–0
MAAC	0–0
MAC	0–0
MEAC	0–0
MVC	0–0
Mountain West	0–0
NEC	0–0
OVC	0–0
Patriot League	0–0
SoCon	0–0
Southland	0–0
SWAC	0–0
Summit	0–0
Sun Belt	0–0
WAC	0–0
WCC	0–0
Other Division I total	0–0
NCAA Division I total	0–0

=== Record against ranked non-conference opponents ===
This is a list of games against ranked opponents only (rankings from the AP poll):

Date	Visitor	Home	Site	Significance	Score	Conf. record
Nov 14	No. 13 Kentucky	No. 8 Indiana	Simon Skjodt Assembly Hall ● Bloomington, IN	—	W 88–67	1–0
Nov 20	Minnesota	No. 2 Connecticut †	Imperial Arena ● Paradise Island, Bahamas	Battle 4 Atlantis	L 58–88	1–1
Nov 21	No. 6 Baylor	No. 3 Maryland	Xfinity Center ● College Park, MD	―	W 79–76	2–1
Nov 25	No. 5 NC State	No. 2 Maryland †	Baha Mar Convention Center ● Nassau, Bahamas	Baha Mar Hoops Pink Flamingo Championship	L 60–78	2–2
Nov 25	No. 7 Stanford	No. 4 Indiana †	Baha Mar Convention Center ● Nassau, Bahamas	Baha Mar Hoops Pink Flamingo Championship	L 66–69	2–3
Nov 25	No. 22 West Virginia	Purdue †	Eckerd College ● St. Petersburg, FL	St. Pete Showcase	L 57–65	2–4
Nov 26	No. 16 Oregon State	No. 12 Michigan †	Ocean Center ● Daytona Beach, FL	Daytona Beach Invitational	W 61–52	3–4
Nov 27	No. 7 Stanford	No. 2 Maryland †	Baha Mar Convention Center ● Nassau, Bahamas	Baha Mar Hoops Pink Flamingo Championship	L 68–86	3–5
Nov 27	No. 9 Arizona	Rutgers †	Sports and Fitness Center ● Saint Thomas, U.S. Virgin Islands	Paradise Jam	L 44–80	3–6
Nov 27	Penn State	No. 13 Iowa State †	Hertz Arena ● Estero, FL	Gulf Coast Showcase	L 59–93	3–7
Nov 27	No. 17 Florida State	Purdue †	Eckerd College ● St. Petersburg, FL	St. Pete Showcase	W 66–61	4–7
Nov 27	No. 23 Texas A&M	Northwestern †	Sports and Fitness Center ● Saint Thomas, U.S. Virgin Islands	Paradise Jam	L 68–77	4–8
Dec 2	No. 2т NC State	No. 6 Indiana	Simon Skjodt Assembly Hall ● Bloomington, IN	ACC–Big Ten Women's Challenge	L 58–66	4–9
Dec 2	No. 12 Michigan	No. 10 Louisville	KFC Yum! Center ● Louisville, KY	ACC–Big Ten Women's Challenge	L 48–70	4–10
Dec 2	No. 24 Notre Dame	Michigan State	Breslin Center ● East Lansing, MI	ACC–Big Ten Women's Challenge	L 71–76	4–11
Dec 2	No. 25 Florida State	Illinois	State Farm Center ● Champaign, IL	ACC–Big Ten Women's Challenge	L 58–67	4–12
Dec 8	No. 12 Iowa	No. 15 Iowa State	Hilton Coliseum ● Ames, IA	Iowa Corn Cy-Hawk Series	L 70–77	4–13
Dec 12	No. 8 Maryland	No. 1 South Carolina	Colonial Life Arena ● Columbia, SC	Jimmy V Classic	L 59–66	4–14
Dec 19	No. 5 Baylor	No. 13 Michigan †	Mohegan Sun Arena ● Uncasville, CT	Basketball Hall of Fame Women's Showcase	W 74–68 ^{(OT)}	5–14

Team rankings are reflective of AP poll when the game was played, not current or final ranking.

† denotes game was played on neutral site

== Head coaches ==
=== Coaching changes prior to the season ===
==== Purdue ====
On March 26, 2021; Purdue announced the 2021–22 season will be the last year of the "Versyp Era" at Purdue, with Katie Gearlds joining the Lady Boilers' staff and then succeeding Versyp as the head coach after the 2021–22 season. The Journal & Courier reported on August 18, 2021 that Purdue University was investigating allegations that Versyp created a "toxic and hostile environment," including verbally attacking players and bullying a member of her coaching staff. It was announced on September 16, 2021 that Versyp would be retiring and replaced by Gearlds a year earlier than originally planned.

==== Wisconsin ====
On March 9, 2021, the Badgers fired Jonathan Tsipis after five years as head coach. On March 25, 2021, Marisa Moseley was named the eighth head coach in Badgers history.

=== Coaches ===
Team	Head coach	Previous job	Years at school	Overall record	Big Ten record	Big Ten titles	Big Ten tournament titles	NCAA tournaments	NCAA Final Fours	NCAA championships
Illinois	Nancy Fahey	Washington (MO)	5	35–79	6–64	0	0	0	0	0
Indiana	Teri Moren	Indiana State	8	148–79	72–50	0	0	3	0	0
Iowa	Lisa Bluder	Drake	22	436–232	219–138	1	2	15	0	0
Maryland	Brenda Frese	Minnesota	20	512–131	109–13 (Note: Frese's ACC conference record excluded since Maryland began Big Ten Conference play in 2014–15)	6	5	17	3	1
Michigan	Kim Barnes Arico	St. John's (Asst.)	10	193–102	86–64	0	0	4	0	0
Michigan State	Suzy Merchant	Eastern Michigan	15	296–157	144–93	2	0	10	0	0
Minnesota	Lindsay Whalen	Minnesota Lynx (Player)	4	44–37	20–31	0	0	0	0	0
Nebraska	Amy Williams	South Dakota	6	72–75	39–48	0	0	1	0	0
Northwestern	Joe McKeown	George Washington	14	223–186	94–128	0	0	2	0	0
Ohio State	Kevin McGuff	Washington	9	169–84	91–45	2	1	4	0	0
Penn State	Carolyn Kieger	Marquette	3	16–38	7–30	0	0	0	0	0
Purdue	Katie Gearlds	Marian	1	0–0	0–0	0	0	0	0	0
Rutgers	C. Vivian Stringer	Iowa	27	535–291	63–52 (Note: Stringer's Big East and American conference records excluded since Rutgers began Big Ten Conference play in 2014–15)	0	0	17	2	0
Wisconsin	Marisa Moseley	Boston University	1	0–0	0–0	0	0	0	0	0

Notes:

- All records, appearances, titles, etc. are from time with current school only.
- Year at school includes 2021–22 season.
- Overall and Big Ten records are from time at current school and are through the beginning of the season.

== Postseason ==
=== Big Ten tournament ===
Iowa won the conference tournament from March 2 to March 6, 2022, at the Gainbridge Fieldhouse, Indianapolis, Indiana. All 14 teams from the conference play at the tournament. The top 10 teams receive a first-round bye and the top four teams receive a double bye. Teams were seeded by conference record, with ties broken by record between the tied teams followed by record of all Division I opponents, after coin toss if necessary.

== Bracket ==
- All times are Eastern.

First round Wednesday, March 2 BTN
12	Penn State	50
13	Rutgers	75
11	Wisconsin	66
14	Illinois	75

Second round Thursday, March 3 BTN
8	Michigan State	73
9	Purdue	69
5	Indiana	66
13	Rutgers	54
7	Northwestern	65
10	Minnesota	60
6	Nebraska	92
14	Illinois	74

Quarterfinals; Friday, March 4 BTN
1	Ohio State	74
8	Michigan State	58
4	Maryland	51
5	Indiana	62
2	Iowa	72
7	Northwestern	59
3	Michigan	73
6	Nebraska	76

Semifinals; Saturday, March 5 BTN
1	Ohio State	62
5	Indiana	70
2	Iowa	83
6	Nebraska	66

Championship; Sunday, March 6 ESPN2
5	Indiana	67
2	Iowa	74

* denotes overtime period

=== NCAA tournament ===
Six teams from the conference were selected to participate: Iowa (as Big Ten tournament champion), and five others at-large bids: Indiana, Maryland, Michigan, Nebraska and Ohio State.

Seed	Region	School	First round	Second round	Sweet Sixteen	Elite Eight	Final Four	Championship
No. 2	Greensboro Regional	Iowa	defeated No. 15 Illinois State 98–58	lost to No. 10 Creighton 62–64	–	–	–	–
No. 3	Bridgeport Regional	Indiana	defeated No. 14 Charlotte 85–51	defeated No. 11 Princeton 56–55	lost to No. 2 Connecticut 58–75	–	–	–
No. 3	Wichita Regional	Michigan	defeated No. 14 American 74–39	defeated No. 11 Villanova 64–49	defeated No. 10 South Dakota 52–49	lost to No. 1 Louisville 50–62	–	–
No. 4	Spokane Regional	Maryland	defeated No. 13 Delaware 102–71	defeated No. 12 Florida Gulf Coast 89–65	lost to No. 1 Stanford 66–72	–	–	–
No. 6	Spokane Regional	Ohio State	defeated No. 11 Missouri State 63–56	defeated No. 3 LSU 79–64	lost to No. 2 Texas 63–66	–	–	–
No. 8	Wichita Regional	Nebraska	lost to No. 9 Gonzaga 55–68	–	–	–	–	–
	6 Bids	W-L (%):	5–1 (.833)	4–1 (.800)	1–3 (.250)	0–1 (.000)	0–0 (–)	TOTAL: 10–6 (.625)

=== National Invitation Tournament ===
Two teams from the conference were selected to participate: Minnesota and Purdue. The Big Ten conference rejected their automatic berth, the two teams qualify from at-large bids.

Bracket	School	First round	Second round	Third round	Quarterfinals	Semifinals	Final
Region 3	Minnesota	defeated Green Bay 73−65	lost to South Dakota State 57−78	–	–	–	–
Region 4	Purdue	defeated Southern Illinois 82−60	lost to Marquette 62−77	–	–	–	–
	2 Bids	2–0 (1.000)	0–2 (.000)	0–0 (–)	0–0 (–)	0–0 (–)	TOTAL: 2–2 (.500)

Index to colors and formatting
Big Ten member won
Big Ten member lost
