= 2021–22 Minnesota Golden Gophers women's basketball team =

Intercollegiate basketball season

2021–22 Minnesota Golden Gophers women's basketball

WNIT, second round
- Conference: Big Ten Conference
- Record: 15–18 (7–11 Big Ten)
- Head coach: Lindsay Whalen (4th season)
- Assistant coaches: Carly Thibault-DuDonis; Shimmy Gray-Miller; Kelly Curry
- Home arena: Williams Arena

2021–22 Big Ten women's basketball standings
	Conf.				Overall
Team	W		L	PCT	W		L	PCT
No. 14 Ohio State	14	–	4	.778	25	–	7	.781
No. 8 Iowa †	14	–	4	.778	24	–	8	.750
No. 12 Michigan	13	–	4	.765	25	–	7	.781
No. 13 Maryland	13	–	4	.765	23	–	9	.719
No. 11 Indiana	11	–	5	.688	24	–	9	.727
Nebraska	11	–	7	.611	24	–	9	.727
Northwestern	8	–	8	.500	17	–	12	.586
Michigan State	8	–	9	.471	15	–	15	.500
Purdue	7	–	11	.389	17	–	15	.531
Minnesota	7	–	11	.389	15	–	18	.455
Penn State	5	–	13	.278	11	–	18	.379
Wisconsin	5	–	13	.278	8	–	21	.276
Rutgers	3	–	14	.176	11	–	20	.355
Illinois	1	–	13	.071	7	–	20	.259
† 2022 Big Ten tournament winner Rankings from AP poll

The 2021–22 Minnesota Golden Gophers women's basketball team represented the University of Minnesota during the 2021–22 NCAA Division I women's basketball season. The Golden Gophers, led by fourth-year head coach Lindsay Whalen, played their home games at Williams Arena and competed as members of the Big Ten Conference.

The Golden Gophers went 14-17 and 7–11 in Big Ten play to finish in tenth place. As the tenth seed in the Big Ten tournament, they were defeated by Northwestern in the second round. They were not invited to the NCAA Tournament, but were chosen as an at-large team for the WNIT.

== Previous season ==
The Golden Gophers finished the season 8–13 and 7–11 in Big Ten play to finish in tenth place. As the ninth seed in the Big Ten tournament, they were defeated by Nebraska in the second round. They were not invited to the NCAA tournament or the WNIT.

== Offseason ==
=== Departures ===
Name	Number	Pos.	Height	Year	Hometown	Reason for departure
Justice Ross	24	F	6'0"	RS freshman	Des Moines, IA	Transferred to New Orleans

=== Arrivals ===
Name	Number	Pos.	Height	Year	Hometown	Previous school	Notes
Deja Winters	3	G	5'11"	Grad senior	Cleveland, Ohio	North Carolina A&T	Grad transfer - able to play immediately
Bailey Helgren	35	C	6'5"	Grad senior	Edina, Minnesota	Kansas	Grad transfer - able to play immediately

=== 2021 recruiting class ===
College recruiting
Name	Hometown	School	Height	Weight	Commit date
Maggie Czinano; G	Watertown, MN	Watertown-Mayer High School	6 ft 0 in (1.83 m)	N/A	
Maggie Czinano; G	Recruit ratings: No ratings found				
Alanna Micheaux; F	Wayne, MI	Wayne Memorial High School	6 ft 2 in (1.88 m)	N/A	
Alanna Micheaux; F	Recruit ratings: No ratings found				
Overall recruit ranking:
Note: In many cases, Scout, Rivals, 247Sports, On3, and ESPN may conflict in their listings of height and weight.; In these cases, the average was taken. ESPN grades are on a 100-point scale.; Sources:

- Katie Borowicz was originally a member of the 2021 recruiting class. She enrolled at the University of Minnesota early and joined the team for the 2020–21 season.

== Roster ==
2021–22 Minnesota Golden Gophers women's basketball team
Players
Coaches

Pos.	#	Name	Height	Year	Previous school	Hometown
G	1	Alexia Smith	5 ft 8 in (1.73 m)	So	Columbus Africentric	Columbus, OH
G	3	Deja Winters	5 ft 11 in (1.8 m)	GS	Richmond Heights; North Carolina A&T	Columbus, OH
G	4	Jasmine Powell	5 ft 6 in (1.68 m)	Jr	Detroit Country Day	Detroit, MI
G	5	Maggie Czinano	6 ft 0 in (1.83 m)	Fr	Watertown-Mayer High School	Watertown, MN
F	10	Erin Hedman	6 ft 3 in (1.91 m)	So	Eisenhower	New Berlin, WI
F	12	Laura Bagwell Katalinich	6 ft 0 in (1.83 m)	GS	Academy of the Holy Angels; Cornell	Minneapolis, MN
G	13	Gadiva Hubbard	5 ft 9 in (1.75 m)	GS	Princess Anne HS	Virginia Beach, VA
G	14	Sara Scalia	5 ft 10 in (1.78 m)	Jr	Stillwater HS	Stillwater, MN
F	15	Kayla Mershon	6 ft 3 in (1.91 m)	Sr	Minnetonka; Nebraska	Chanhasen, MN
G	21	Caroline Strande	5 ft 11 in (1.8 m)	So	Racine Lutheran	Racine, WI
G	23	Katie Borowicz	5 ft 7 in (1.7 m)	So	Roseau	Roseau, MN
C	25	Klarke Sconiers	6 ft 2 in (1.88 m)	Jr	Christ the King HS	Queens, NY
F	30	Kadi Sissoko	6 ft 2 in (1.88 m)	RS Jr	Lycée Marcelin Berthelot; Syracuse	Paris, France
F	35	Bailey Helgren	6 ft 5 in (1.96 m)	GS	Edina; Kansas	Edina, MN
F	43	Grace Cumming	6 ft 3 in (1.91 m)	RS So	Des Moines Roosevelt HS	Des Moines, IA
F	54	Alanna Micheaux	6 ft 2 in (1.88 m)	Fr	Wayne Memorial	Wayne, MI

Head coach

- Lindsay Whalen (Minnesota)

Assistant coach(es)

- Carly Thibault-DuDonis (Monmouth)
- Shimmy Gray-Miller (Michigan)
- Kelly Curry (Minnesota)

Legend

- (C) Team captain
- (S) Suspended
- (I) Ineligible
- (W) Walk-on
- Injured
- Current redshirt

Roster
Last update: October 31, 2021

== Schedule and results ==
Date time, TV	Rank^{#}	Opponent^{#}	Result	Record	Site (attendance) city, state
Exhibition
10/31/21*; 2:00 pm, BTN Plus		Minnesota-Crookston	W 78–33		Williams Arena; Minneapolis, MN
Regular season
11/9/21*; 12:00 pm, BTN Plus		Jacksonville	L 66–69	0–1	Williams Arena (2,554); Minneapolis, MN
11/12/21*; 8:00 pm		at Arizona State	W 66–59 ^{OT}	1–1	Desert Financial Arena (4,111); Tempe, AZ
11/14/2021*; 2:00 pm, BTN Plus		George Washington	W 48–32	2–1	Williams Arena (3,056); Minneapolis, MN
11/17/2021*; 7:00 pm, BTN Plus		American	W 73-56	3-1	Williams Arena (2,643); Minneapolis, MN
11/20/2021*; 11:00 am, Flo Hoops		vs. No. 2 Connecticut; Battle 4 Atlantis tournament, preliminary	L 58-88	3-2	Imperial Arena (1,175); Paradise Island, Bahamas
11/21/2021*; 4:00 pm, Flo Hoops		vs. Syracuse; Battle 4 Atlantis tournament, Consolation 2nd Round	W 70-63	4-2	Imperial Arena (420); Paradise Island, Bahamas
11/22/2021*; Flo Hoops		vs. Oklahoma; Battle 4 Atlantis tournament, 5th Place Game	L 69-88	4-3	Imperial Arena (267); Paradise Island, Bahamas
11/26/2021*; 3:00 pm, BTN Plus		Bradley	W 73-54	5-3	Williams Arena (3,389); Minneapolis, MN
11/28/2021*; 2:00 pm, BTN Plus		UTSA	W 81-52	6-3	Williams Arena (3,150); Minneapolis, MN
12/1/2021*; 8:00 pm, BTN		North Carolina; Big Ten/ACC Challenge	L 76-82	6-4	Williams Arena (3,432); Minneapolis, MN
12/6/2021; 7:00 pm, BTN		Nebraska	L 67-70	6-5 (0-1)	Williams Arena (3,300); Minneapolis, MN
12/12/2021; 1:00 pm, BTN Plus		at No. 13 Michigan	L 61-73	6-6 (0-2)	Crisler Center (2,484); Ann Arbor, MI
12/12/2021*; 7:00 pm, BTN Plus		Ohio	W 99-93	7-6 (0-2)	Williams Arena (2,751); Minneapolis, MN
12/23/2021*; 2:00 pm, ESPN+		Drake	L 63-77	7-7 (0-2)	Knapp Center (2,183); Des Moines, IA
01/6/2022; 6:00 pm		at Rutgers	W 62-49	8-7 (1-2)	Louis Brown Athletic Center (1,001); Piscataway, New Jersey
01/9/2022; 2:00 pm, BTN Plus		No. 10 Maryland	L 73-87	8-8 (1-3)	Williams Arena (3,447); Minneapolis MN
01/12/2020; 6:30 pm, BTN Plus		at Wisconsin	W 82-66	9-8 (2-3)	Kohl Center (2,157); Madison, WI
01/15/2022; 5:00 pm, BTN Plus		No. RV Ohio State	L 75-83	9-9 (2-4)	Williams Arena (3,177); Minneapolis, MN
01/20/2022; 7:00 pm, BTN		No. 25 Iowa	L 49-105	9-10 (2-5)	Williams Arena (3,741); Minneapolis, MN
01/23/2022; 1:00 pm		at Michigan State	L 71-74	9-11 (2-6)	Breslin Center (2,899); East Lansing, MI
01/27/2022; 6:00 pm, BTN Plus		at Purdue	L 66-80	9-12 (2-7)	Mackey Arena (2,901); West Lafayette, IN
01/30/2022; 2:00 pm, BTN		Wisconsin	W 57-55	10-12 (3-7)	Williams Arena (4,482); Minneapolis, MN
02/3/2022; 6:00 pm, BTN Plus		at No. 5 Indiana	L 70-80	10-13 (3-8)	Simon Skjodt Assembly Hall (No Attendance - Weather); Bloomington, IN
02/06/2022; 2:00 pm, BTN Plus		Michigan State	W 71-60	11-13 (4-8)	Williams Arena (3,150); Minneapolis, MN
02/10/2022; 6:30 pm		at Iowa	L 78-88	11-14 (4-9)	Carver–Hawkeye Arena (8,141); Iowa City, IA
2/11/2022; 3:30 pm, BTN Plus		Northwestern	W 74-68	12-14 (5-9)	Williams Arena (2,734); Minneapolis, MN
02/17/2022; 7:00 pm, BTN Plus		Rutgers	L 61-79	12-15 (5-10)	Williams Arena (2,747); Minneapolis, MN
02/30/2022; 2:00 pm, BTN Plus		at No. RV Nebraska	L 70-93	12-16 (5-11)	Pinnacle Bank Arena (6,566); Lincoln, NE
02/24/2022; 7:00 pm, BTN Plus		Illinois	W 87-54	13-16 (6-11)	Williams Arena (2,896); Minneapolis, MN
02/30/2022; BTN		at Penn State	W 94-83	14-16 (7-11)	Bryce Jordan Center (2,401); University Park, PA
Big Ten Women's tournament
March 3, 2022; 5:30 pm, BTN	(10)	vs. (7) Northwestern; 2nd Round	L 60-65	14-17	Gainbridge Fieldhouse (–); Indianapolis, IN
WNIT
March 17, 2022*; 7:00 pm, ESPN+		at Green Bay; 1st Round	W 73-65	15-17	Kress Events Center (–); Green Bay, WI
March 20, 2022*; 2:00 pm		at South Dakota State; 2nd Round	L 57–78	15-18	Frost Arena (–); Brookings, SD
*Non-conference game. ^{#}Rankings from AP Poll. (#) Tournament seedings in parentheses. All times are in Central Time.

== Rankings ==
Regular season polls
Poll	Pre- season	Week 2	Week 3	Week 4	Week 5	Week 6	Week 7	Week 8	Week 9	Week 10	Week 11	Week 12	Week 13	Week 14	Week 15	Week 16	Final
AP																	
Coaches																	

Legend
	Increase in ranking
	Decrease in ranking
	Not ranked previous week
(RV)	Received votes
(NR)	Not ranked and did not receive votes

== See also ==
- 2021–22 Minnesota Golden Gophers men's basketball team
