= 2021–22 Delaware Fightin' Blue Hens women's basketball team =

Intercollegiate basketball season

2021–22 Delaware Fightin' Blue Hens women's basketball

CAA tournament champions

NCAA tournament, first round
- Conference: Colonial Athletic Association
- Record: 24–8 (15–3 CAA)
- Head coach: Natasha Adair (5th season)
- Assistant coaches: Bob Clark; Darrell Mosley; Mykala Walker
- Home arena: Bob Carpenter Center

2021–22 CAA women's basketball standings
	Conf.				Overall
Team	W		L	PCT	W		L	PCT
Drexel	16	–	2	.889	28	–	6	.824
Delaware †	15	–	3	.833	25	–	7	.781
Towson	14	–	4	.778	24	–	8	.750
James Madison*	10	–	8	.556	14	–	15	.483
Elon	9	–	9	.500	17	–	12	.586
Charleston	9	–	9	.500	18	–	13	.581
Northeastern	8	–	10	.444	14	–	18	.438
William & Mary	5	–	13	.278	10	–	20	.333
Hofstra	4	–	14	.222	8	–	20	.286
UNC Wilmington	0	–	18	.000	3	–	26	.103
† 2022 CAA tournament winner *Ineligible for the CAA Tournament due to a postseason ban imposed by the CAA.

The 2021–22 Delaware Fightin' Blue Hens women's basketball team represented the University of Delaware during the 2021–22 NCAA Division I women's basketball season. The Fightin' Blue Hens, led by fifth-year head coach Natasha Adair, played their home games at the Bob Carpenter Center and were members of the Colonial Athletic Association (CAA).

They finished the season 24–8, 15–3 in CAA play to finish in second place. As the second seed in the CAA tournament, they defeated William & Mary in the quarterfinals, Towson in the semifinals, and Drexel in the final to win their third championship in team history. They received an automatic bid to the NCAA tournament, and were the thirteen seed in the Spokane Regional. They were defeated in the first round by Maryland to end their season.

== Previous season ==
The Blue Hens finished the regular season 19–3, 16–2 in CAA play to win their first conference regular season championship since 2013. They lost in the finals of the CAA women's tournament to Drexel. The team was given an automatic qualifier to the 2021 Women's National Invitation Tournament, where they won the Charlotte Regional Championship by defeating Villanova. The team lost to eventual WNIT Champion Rice in the semifinals, marking Delaware's furthest advance in the tournament. The team received Top 25 votes in the Coaches Poll of the 2020–21 NCAA Division I women's basketball rankings in weeks 8, 9, 16, and 17.

== Roster ==
2021–22 Delaware Fightin' Blue Hens women's basketball team
Players
Coaches

Pos.	#	Name	Height	Year	Previous school	Hometown
G	2	Tara Cousins	5 ft 8 in (1.73 m)	So	New Hope Academy	Washington, D.C.
G	3	Tyi Skinner	5 ft 5 in (1.65 m)	So	TPLS Christian Academy	Washington, D.C.
G	4	Paris McBride	5 ft 4 in (1.63 m)	Sr	Woodbridge	Woodbridge, VA
G	10	Tee Johnson	5 ft 5 in (1.65 m)	GS	West Port/Tallahassee CC	Ocala, FL
F	12	Lizzie O'Leary	6 ft 2 in (1.88 m)	GS	Abington	Willow Grove, PA
G	13	Mia Yanogacio	5 ft 7 in (1.7 m)	Fr	Rutgers Prep	Somerset, NJ
G/F	14	Makayla Pippin	5 ft 11 in (1.8 m)	Sr	National Christian; Kansas State	Indianapolis, IN
G	20	Jasmine Dickey	5 ft 10 in (1.78 m)	Sr	Catonsville	Baltimore, MD
G	22	Mar Tejedor	5 ft 9 in (1.75 m)	So	Ins Moisès Broggi/Boet Mataró	Badalona, Spain
G	23	Jadaia Reid	5 ft 9 in (1.75 m)	So	Crestwood Preparatory	Brampton, Ontario
C	24	Aja Austin	6 ft 1 in (1.85 m)	Fr	Westerville South	Westerville, OH
F	25	Maddie Simms	6 ft 1 in (1.85 m)	GS	Lenape	Mount Laurel, NJ
G	30	Jewell Smalls	5 ft 7 in (1.7 m)	RS Sr	McEachern/Western Carolina	Roswell, GA
F	32	Ty Battle	6 ft 0 in (1.83 m)	RS Sr	Oswego East/Indiana State	Plainfield, IL

Head coach

- Natasha Adair (South Florida)

Assistant coach(es)

- Bob Clark (Towson)
- Darrell Mosley (Lincoln)
- Mykala Walker (Wake Forest)

Legend

- (C) Team captain
- (S) Suspended
- (I) Ineligible
- (W) Walk-on
- Injured
- Current redshirt

Roster
Last update: May 27, 2022

== Schedule ==
Date time, TV	Rank^{#}	Opponent^{#}	Result	Record	Site (attendance) city, state
Non-conference regular season
November 9, 2021*; 6:30 p.m., FloHoops		Chestnut Hill	W 87–48	1–0	Bob Carpenter Center (774); Newark, DE
November 12, 2021*; 7:00 p.m., FloHoops		Princeton	L 56–76	1–1	Bob Carpenter Center (997); Newark, DE
November 15, 2021*; 7:00 p.m., ESPN+		at Maine	W 83–60	2–1	Cross Insurance Center (1,013); Bangor, ME
November 19, 2021*; 7:00 p.m.		at Delaware State	W 79–48	3–1	Memorial Hall (512); Dover, DE
November 21, 2021*; 1:00 p.m., FloHoops		Charlotte	W 73–57	4–1	Bob Carpenter Center (720); Newark, DE
November 26, 2021*; 2:00 p.m.		vs. Eastern Michigan; FIU Thanksgiving Tournament	W 87–72	5–1	Ocean Bank Convocation Center (165); Miami, FL
November 27, 2021*; Noon		vs. Chicago State; FIU Thanksgiving Tournament	W 72–63	6–1	Ocean Bank Convocation Center (0); Miami, FL
December 2, 2021*; 7:00 p.m., ESPN+		at Columbia	L 67–73	6–2	Levien Gymnasium (532); New York, NY
December 7, 2021*; 8:00 p.m., ESPN+		at SMU	L 55–61	6–3	Moody Coliseum (422); Dallas, TX
December 11, 2021*; 3:00 p.m., B1G+		at Northwestern	L 53–76	6–4	Welsh–Ryan Arena (919); Evanston, IL
December 22, 2021*; 1:00 p.m., FloHoops		VCU	Cancelled		Bob Carpenter Center; Newark, DE
CAA regular season
January 9, 2022; 1:00 p.m., FloHoops		at Charleston	W 86–84 ^{OT}	7–4 (1–0)	TD Arena (264); Charleston, SC
January 14, 2022; 7:00 p.m., FloHoops		Hofstra	W 73–38	8–4 (2–0)	Bob Carpenter Center (788); Newark, DE
January 16, 2022; 1:00 p.m., FloHoops		Northeastern	W 79–60	9–4 (3–0)	Bob Carpenter Center (767); Newark, DE
January 18, 2022; 6:00 p.m., FloHoops		James Madison; Rescheduled from December 31	W 64–57	10–4 (4–0)	Bob Carpenter Center (790); Newark, DE
January 23, 2022; 2:00 p.m., FloHoops		at Drexel	L 62–70	10–5 (4–1)	Daskalakis Athletic Center (667); Philadelphia, PA
January 26, 2022; 7:00 p.m., FloHoops		at UNC Wilmington; Rescheduled from January 7	W 78–69	11–5 (5–1)	Trask Coliseum (346); Wilmington, NC
January 28, 2022; 7:00 p.m., FloHoops		at William & Mary	W 70–56	12–5 (6–1)	Kaplan Arena (313); Williamsburg, VA
January 30, 2022; 2:00 p.m., FloHoops		at Elon	W 87–65	13–5 (7–1)	Schar Center (846); Elon, NC
February 4, 2022; 7:00 p.m., FloHoops		Charleston	W 103–79	14–5 (8–1)	Bob Carpenter Center (799); Newark, DE
February 6, 2022; 1:00 p.m., FloHoops		UNC Wilmington	W 77–62	15–5 (9–1)	Bob Carpenter Center (1,294); Newark, DE
February 9, 2022; 7:00 p.m., FloHoops		at Towson; Rescheduled from January 2	W 87–78	16–5 (10–1)	SECU Arena (889); Towson, MD
February 11, 2022; 6:00 p.m., FloHoops		at Northeastern	W 66–63	17–5 (11–1)	Cabot Center (254); Boston, MA
February 13, 2022; 2:00 p.m., FloHoops		at Hofstra	W 71–58	18–5 (12–1)	Mack Sports Complex (273); Hempstead, NY
February 20, 2022; 1:00 p.m., FloHoops		Drexel	L 64–65	18–6 (12–2)	Bob Carpenter Center (1,834); Newark, DE
February 25, 2022; 11:00 a.m., FloHoops		Elon	W 65–61	19–6 (13–2)	Bob Carpenter Center; Newark, DE
February 27, 2022; 1:00 p.m., FloHoops		William & Mary	W 67–45	20–6 (14–2)	Bob Carpenter Center (1,372); Newark, DE
March 3, 2022; 7:00 p.m., FloHoops		at Towson	W 85–71	21–6 (15–2)	SECU Arena (933); Towson, MD
March 5, 2022; 4:00 p.m., FloHoops		at James Madison	L 62–78	21–7 (15–3)	Atlantic Union Bank Center (2,705); Harrisonburg, VA
CAA Women's Tournament
March 11, 2022; 5:00 p.m., FloHoops	(2)	vs. (7) William & Mary; Quarterfinals	W 61–35	22–7	Daskalakis Athletic Center (0); Philadelphia, PA
March 12, 2022; 3:30 p.m., FloHoops	(2)	vs. (3) Towson; Semifinals	W 56–55	23–7	Daskalakis Athletic Center (1,385); Philadelphia, PA
March 13, 2022; 1:00 p.m., FloHoops	(2)	at (1) Drexel; Final	W 63–59	24–7	Daskalakis Athletic Center (1,812); Philadelphia, PA
NCAA tournament
March 18, 2022; 5:00 p.m., ESPNU	(13 S)	at (4 S) No. 13 Maryland; First Round	L 71–102	24–8	Xfinity Center (4,776); College Park, MD
*Non-conference game. ^{#}Rankings from AP Poll. (#) Tournament seedings in parentheses. S=Spokane. All times are in Eastern Time.

== Rankings ==
Ranking movements Legend: ██ Increase in ranking ██ Decrease in ranking — = Not ranked RV = Received votes
	Week																		
Poll	Pre	1	2	3	4	5	6	7	8	9	10	11	12	13	14	15	16	17	Final
AP	—	—	—	—	—	—	—	—	—	—	—	—	—	—	—	—	—	—	—
Coaches	RV	—	—	—	—	—	—	—	—	—	—	—	—	—	—	—	—	—	—

Legend
	Increase in ranking
	Decrease in ranking
	Not ranked previous week
(RV)	Received votes
(NR)	Not ranked and did not receive votes

The Coaches Poll did not release a Week 2 poll, and the AP Poll did not release a poll after the NCAA Tournament.
