= 2021–22 Michigan Wolverines women's basketball team =

Intercollegiate basketball season

2021–22 Michigan Wolverines women's basketball

NCAA women's tournament, Elite Eight
- Conference: Big Ten Conference

Ranking
- Coaches: No. 7
- AP: No. 12
- Record: 25–7 (13–4 Big Ten)
- Head coach: Kim Barnes Arico (10th season)
- Assistant coaches: Carrie Moore; Valerie Nainima; Harry Rafferty
- Home arena: Crisler Center

2021–22 Big Ten women's basketball standings
	Conf.				Overall
Team	W		L	PCT	W		L	PCT
No. 14 Ohio State	14	–	4	.778	25	–	7	.781
No. 8 Iowa †	14	–	4	.778	24	–	8	.750
No. 12 Michigan	13	–	4	.765	25	–	7	.781
No. 13 Maryland	13	–	4	.765	23	–	9	.719
No. 11 Indiana	11	–	5	.688	24	–	9	.727
Nebraska	11	–	7	.611	24	–	9	.727
Northwestern	8	–	8	.500	17	–	12	.586
Michigan State	8	–	9	.471	15	–	15	.500
Purdue	7	–	11	.389	17	–	15	.531
Minnesota	7	–	11	.389	15	–	18	.455
Penn State	5	–	13	.278	11	–	18	.379
Wisconsin	5	–	13	.278	8	–	21	.276
Rutgers	3	–	14	.176	11	–	20	.355
Illinois	1	–	13	.071	7	–	20	.259
† 2022 Big Ten tournament winner Rankings from AP poll

The 2021–22 Michigan Wolverines women's basketball team represented the University of Michigan during the 2021–22 NCAA Division I women's basketball season. The Wolverines were led by head coach Kim Barnes Arico in her tenth year, and played their home games at the Crisler Center. This season marked the program's 40th season as a member of the Big Ten Conference.

This season was highlighted by Michigan reaching their highest ranking ever in the AP Poll at No. 4. They also earned their first ever win over a top-five ranked team when they defeated No. 5 Baylor 74–68 in overtime on December 19, 2021. Naz Hillmon also became the program's all-time leading rebounder, surpassing the previous record set by Trish Andrew in 1993. They were ranked the No. 3 seed in the 2022 NCAA tournament, their highest seed ever, and advanced to the Elite Eight for the first time in program history.

== Previous season ==
The Wolverines finished the 2020–21 season with a 16–6 record, including 9–5 in Big Ten play to finish in fourth place. They also reached No. 11 in the AP Poll, their highest rank ever, and were ranked the No. 6 seed in the 2021 NCAA tournament, their highest seed ever. The Wolverines advanced to the Sweet Sixteen for the first time in program history.

== Offseason ==
On April 1, 2021, former assistant coach Toyelle Wilson was named the head coach at SMU.

On September 10, 2021, Kim Barnes Arico signed a contract extension through the 2025–26 season.

== Roster ==
2021–22 Michigan Wolverines women's basketball team
Players
Coaches

Pos.	#	Name	Height	Year	Previous school	Hometown
F	00	Naz Hillmon	6 ft 2 in (1.88 m)	Sr	Gilmour Academy	Cleveland, OH
G	1	Amy Dilk	6 ft 0 in (1.83 m)	Sr	Carmel	Carmel, IN
G	3	Maddie Nolan	5 ft 9 in (1.75 m)	Jr	Zionsville	Zionsville, IN
G	5	Laila Phelia	6 ft 0 in (1.83 m)	Fr	Mount Notre Dame	Cincinnati, OH
G	10	Jordan Hobbs	6 ft 3 in (1.91 m)	Fr	Springboro	Springboro, OH
G	12	Ari Wiggins	5 ft 8 in (1.73 m)	Fr	Heritage Christian	Indianapolis, IN
F	15	Taylor Gibson	6 ft 2 in (1.88 m)	Fr	Bishop McNamara	Upper Marlboro, MD
G	23	Danielle Rauch	5 ft 8 in (1.73 m)	Sr	Bishop Ludden	Syracuse, NY
G	24	Michelle Sidor	5 ft 8 in (1.73 m)	Jr	Saddle River Day	Upper Saddle River, NJ
F	25	Whitney Sollom	6 ft 4 in (1.93 m)	So	Hartland	Hartland, MI
F	30	Elise Stuck	6 ft 1 in (1.85 m)	So	Charlevoix	Charlevoix, MI
F	32	Leigha Brown	6 ft 1 in (1.85 m)	Sr	DeKalb	Noblesville, IN
F	33	Emily Kiser	6 ft 3 in (1.91 m)	Sr	Noblesville	Noblesville, IN
C	34	Izabel Varejão	6 ft 4 in (1.93 m)	Jr	Neuse Christian Academy	Vitória, Brazil
F	44	Cameron Williams	6 ft 3 in (1.91 m)	So	Whitney Young	Chicago, IL

Head coach

- Kim Barnes Arico (Montclair State)

Assistant coach(es)

- Carrie Moore (Western Michigan)
- Valerie Nainima (South Carolina)
- Harry Rafferty (Michigan)

Legend

- (C) Team captain
- (S) Suspended
- (I) Ineligible
- (W) Walk-on
- Injured
- Current redshirt

Roster

== Schedule and results ==
Date time, TV	Rank^{#}	Opponent^{#}	Result	Record	Site (attendance) city, state
Exhibition
November 4, 2021*; 7:00 pm	No. 11	Grand Valley State	W 80–57	–	Crisler Center (1,672); Ann Arbor, MI
Regular season
November 9, 2021*; 7:00 pm	No. 11	IUPUI	W 67–62 ^{OT}	1–0	Crisler Center (1,948); Ann Arbor, MI
November 13, 2021*; 2:00 pm	No. 11	St. Francis Brooklyn	W 82–46	2–0	Crisler Center (2,363); Ann Arbor, MI
November 16, 2021*; 6:00 pm	No. 13	UMass Lowell	W 73–54	3–0	Crisler Center (1,957); Ann Arbor, MI
November 20, 2021*; 1:00 pm	No. 13	at Central Michigan	W 69–45	4–0	McGuirk Arena (2,654); Mount Pleasant, MI
November 22, 2021*; 7:00 pm	No. 13	Oakland	W 69–58	5–0	Crisler Center (1,967); Ann Arbor, MI
November 26, 2021*; 6:45 pm	No. 12	vs. No. 16 Oregon State; Daytona Beach Invitational	W 61–52	6–0	Ocean Center; Daytona Beach, FL
November 27, 2021*; 4:30 pm	No. 12	vs. Mississippi State; Daytona Beach Invitational	W 64–48	7–0	Ocean Center; Daytona Beach, FL
December 2, 2021*; 7:00 pm, ESPN	No. 12	at No. 10 Louisville; ACC–Big Ten Challenge	L 48–70	7–1	KFC Yum! Center (7,309); Louisville, KY
December 5, 2021*; 2:00 pm	No. 12	Akron	W 93–54	8–1	Crisler Center (2,274); Ann Arbor, MI
December 9, 2021; 9:00 pm, BTN	No. 13	at Wisconsin	W 93–81	9–1 (1–0)	Kohl Center (2,669); Madison, WI
December 12, 2021; 2:00 pm	No. 13	Minnesota	W 73–61	10–1 (2–0)	Crisler Center (2,484); Ann Arbor, MI
December 19, 2021*; 1:00 pm, ESPN	No. 13	vs. No. 5 Baylor; Basketball Hall of Fame Women's Showcase	W 74–68 ^{OT}	11–1	Mohegan Sun (8,204); Uncasville, CT
December 22, 2021*; 1:00 pm	No. 9	Eastern Michigan	Cancelled (COVID-19 pandemic)		Crisler Center; Ann Arbor, MI
December 31, 2021; 12:00 pm, BTN	No. 9	No. 25 Ohio State; Rivalry	W 90–71	12–1 (3–0)	Crisler Center (7,904); Ann Arbor, MI
January 4, 2022; 9:00 pm, BTN	No. 8	at Nebraska	L 58–79	12–2 (3–1)	Pinnacle Bank Arena (3,591); Lincoln, NE
January 9, 2022; 12:00 pm, FS1	No. 8	Rutgers	W 76–47	13–2 (4–1)	Crisler Center (2,154); Ann Arbor, MI
January 13, 2022; 7:00 pm	No. 11	at Penn State	W 74–57	14–2 (5–1)	Bryce Jordan Center (1,622); University Park, PA
January 16, 2022; 5:00 pm, ESPN2	No. 11	at No. 8 Maryland	W 69–49	15–2 (6–1)	Xfinity Center (4,189); College Park, MD
January 20, 2022; 7:00 pm, BTN+	No. 8	Wisconsin	W 83–44	16–2 (7–1)	Crisler Center (1,994); Ann Arbor, MI
January 24, 2022; 6:00 pm, BTN	No. 7	Purdue	W 79–66	17–2 (8–1)	Crisler Center (1,845); Ann Arbor, MI
January 27, 2022; 7:00 pm, BTN	No. 7	at No. 22 Ohio State; Rivalry	W 77–58	18–2 (9–1)	Value City Arena (4,293); Columbus, OH
January 31, 2022; 7:00 pm, ESPN2	No. 6	No. 5 Indiana	W 65–50	19–2 (10–1)	Crisler Center (4,198); Ann Arbor, MI
February 3, 2022; 8:00 pm	No. 6	at Illinois	Postponed (inclement weather)		State Farm Center; Champaign, IL
February 6, 2022; 6:30 pm, BTN	No. 6	No. 21 Iowa	W 98–90	20–2 (11–1)	Crisler Center (3,827); Ann Arbor, MI
February 10, 2022; 6:30 pm, BTN	No. 4	at Michigan State; Rivalry	L 57–63	20–3 (11–2)	Breslin Center (4,764); East Lansing, MI
February 13, 2022; 1:00 pm	No. 4	at Northwestern	L 69–71 ^{2OT}	20–4 (11–3)	Welsh–Ryan Arena (2,341); Evanston, IL
February 20, 2022; 3:00 pm, BTN	No. 9	No. 13 Maryland	W 71–59	21–4 (12–3)	Crisler Center (6,394); Ann Arbor, MI
February 24, 2022; 6:00 pm, BTN	No. 6	Michigan State; Rivalry	W 62–51	22–4 (13–3)	Crisler Center (5,460); Ann Arbor, MI
February 27, 2022; 4:00 pm, ESPN2	No. 6	at No. 21 Iowa	L 80–104	22–5 (13–4)	Carver–Hawkeye Arena (15,056); Iowa City, IA
Big Ten Women's Tournament
March 4, 2022; 9:00 pm, BTN	(3) No. 10	vs. (6) Nebraska; Quarterfinals	L 73–76	22–6	Gainbridge Fieldhouse (0); Indianapolis, IN
NCAA Women's Tournament
March 19, 2022; 3:30 pm, ESPN2	(3 W) No. 12	(14 W) American; First round	W 74–39	23–6	Crisler Center (6,471); Ann Arbor, MI
March 21, 2022; 6:00 p.m., ESPNU	(3 W) No. 12	(11 W) Villanova; Second round	W 64–49	24–6	Crisler Center (5,581); Ann Arbor, MI
March 26, 2022; 6:30 p.m., ESPN2	(3 W) No. 12	vs. (10 W) South Dakota; Sweet Sixteen	W 52–49	25–6	Intrust Bank Arena (8,540); Wichita, KS
March 28, 2022; 9:00 p.m., ESPN	(3 W) No. 12	vs. (1 W) No. 4 Louisville; Elite Eight	L 50–62	25–7	Intrust Bank Arena (4,695); Wichita, KS
*Non-conference game. ^{#}Rankings from AP Poll. (#) Tournament seedings in parentheses. W=Wichita. All times are in Eastern Time. Source:

== Rankings ==
Ranking movement Legend: ██ Increase in ranking. ██ Decrease in ranking. NR = Not ranked. RV = Received votes.
Poll	Pre	Wk 2	Wk 3	Wk 4	Wk 5	Wk 6	Wk 7	Wk 8	Wk 9	Wk 10	Wk 11	Wk 12	Wk 13	Wk 14	Wk 15	Wk 16	Wk 17	Wk 18	Wk 19	Final
AP	11	13	12	12	13	13	9	9	8	11	8	7	6	4	9	6	10	12	12	12
Coaches	10	10^	9	9	11	11	7	7	7	10	8	7	5	4	9	5	9	12	12	7

^Coaches did not release a Week 2 poll.
