= 2021–22 Indiana Hoosiers women's basketball team =

American college basketball season

2021–22 Indiana Hoosiers women's basketball

NCAA tournament, Sweet Sixteen
- Conference: Big Ten Conference

Ranking
- Coaches: No. 11
- AP: No. 11
- Record: 24–9 (11–5 Big Ten)
- Head coach: Teri Moren (8th season)
- Assistant coaches: Rhet Wierzba; Glenn Box; Ashley Williams
- Home arena: Simon Skjodt Assembly Hall

2021–22 Big Ten women's basketball standings
	Conf.				Overall
Team	W		L	PCT	W		L	PCT
No. 14 Ohio State	14	–	4	.778	25	–	7	.781
No. 8 Iowa †	14	–	4	.778	24	–	8	.750
No. 12 Michigan	13	–	4	.765	25	–	7	.781
No. 13 Maryland	13	–	4	.765	23	–	9	.719
No. 11 Indiana	11	–	5	.688	24	–	9	.727
Nebraska	11	–	7	.611	24	–	9	.727
Northwestern	8	–	8	.500	17	–	12	.586
Michigan State	8	–	9	.471	15	–	15	.500
Purdue	7	–	11	.389	17	–	15	.531
Minnesota	7	–	11	.389	15	–	18	.455
Penn State	5	–	13	.278	11	–	18	.379
Wisconsin	5	–	13	.278	8	–	21	.276
Rutgers	3	–	14	.176	11	–	20	.355
Illinois	1	–	13	.071	7	–	20	.259
† 2022 Big Ten tournament winner Rankings from AP poll

The 2021–22 Indiana Hoosiers women's basketball team represented the Indiana University Bloomington during the 2021–22 NCAA Division I women's basketball season. The Hoosiers were led by head coach Teri Moren in her eighth season, and played their home games at the Simon Skjodt Assembly Hall as a member of the Big Ten Conference.

== Previous season ==
The Hoosiers finished the 2020–21 season with a 21–5 record, including 16–2 in Big Ten play to finish in second place in the conference. They received an at-large bid to the 2021 NCAA Division I women's basketball tournament, where they advanced to the Elite Eight.

== Roster ==
2021–22 Indiana Hoosiers women's basketball team
Players
Coaches

Pos.	#	Name	Height	Year	Previous school	Hometown
G	1	Kaitlin Peterson	5 ft 9 in (1.75 m)	Fr	Eufaula	Eufaula, AL
G	3	Grace Waggoner	6 ft 0 in (1.83 m)	Jr	Rivet	Vincennes, IN
G	4	Nicole Cardaño-Hillary	5 ft 6 in (1.68 m)	GS	Vista Ridge; George Mason	Madrid, Spain
G	5	Caitlin Hose	5 ft 10 in (1.78 m)	Sr	Hazel Green; Georgia	Hazel Green, AL
F	10	Aleksa Gulbe	6 ft 3 in (1.91 m)	Sr	TTT Riga	Riga, Latvia
G	14	Ali Patberg	5 ft 11 in (1.8 m)	GS	Columbus North; Notre Dame	Columbus, IN
G	21	Keyarah Berry	5 ft 9 in (1.75 m)	Fr	Rockmart	Rockmart, GA
G	22	Chloe Moore-McNeil	5 ft 11 in (1.8 m)	So	Greenfield	Sharon, TN
F	23	Kiandra Brown	6 ft 2 in (1.88 m)	So	St. Laurent	Montreal, Canada
F	24	Mona Zaric	6 ft 2 in (1.88 m)	Fr	–	Novi Sad, Serbia
C	25	Arielle Wisne	6 ft 5 in (1.96 m)	RS So	Horizon	Thornton, CO
G	34	Grace Berger	6 ft 0 in (1.83 m)	Sr	Sacred Heart	Louisville, KY
F	54	Mackenzie Holmes	6 ft 3 in (1.91 m)	Jr	Gorham	Gorham, ME

Head coach

- Teri Moren (Purdue)

Assistant coach(es)

- Rhet Wierzba (Austin Peay)
- Glenn Box (Southeast Missouri State)
- Ashley Williams (NC State)

Legend

- (C) Team captain
- (S) Suspended
- (I) Ineligible
- (W) Walk-on
- Injured
- Current redshirt

Roster
Last update: January 27, 2022

== Schedule and results ==
Date time, TV	Rank^{#}	Opponent^{#}	Result	Record	Site (attendance) city, state
Exhibition
November 5, 2021*; 7:00 pm	No. 8	Indianapolis	W 97–43	–	Simon Skjodt Assembly Hall (1,842); Bloomington, IN
Regular season
November 10, 2021*; 7:00 pm, BEDN/FloSports	No. 8	at Butler	W 86–63	1–0	Hinkle Fieldhouse (2,360); Indianapolis, IN
November 14, 2021*; 5:00 pm, ESPN	No. 8	No. 13 Kentucky; Rivalry	W 88–67	2–0	Simon Skjodt Assembly Hall (5,394); Bloomington, IN
November 16, 2021*; 7:00 pm, BTN+	No. 4	Norfolk State	W 72–42	3–0	Simon Skjodt Assembly Hall (3,398); Bloomington, IN
November 20, 2021*; 4:00 pm, ESPN3	No. 4	at Quinnipiac	W 67–59	4–0	People's United Center (1,415); Hamden, CT
November 25, 2021*; 1:30 pm, FloHoops	No. 4	vs. No. 7 Stanford; Baha Mar Hoops Pink Flamingo Championship	L 66–69	4–1	Baha Mar Convention Center; Nassau, Bahamas
November 27, 2021*; 8:30 pm, FloHoops	No. 4	vs. Miami; Baha Mar Hoops Pink Flamingo Championship	W 53–51	5–1	Baha Mar Convention Center; Nassau, Bahamas
December 2, 2021*; 8:00 pm, ESPN2	No. 6	No. 2 NC State; ACC–Big Ten Challenge	L 58–66	5–2	Simon Skjodt Assembly Hall (5,242); Bloomington, IN
December 6, 2021; 6:00 pm, BTN	No. 10	Penn State	W 70–40	6–2 (1–0)	Simon Skjodt Assembly Hall (3,224); Bloomington, IN
December 9, 2021*; 7:00 pm, BTN+	No. 10	Fairfield	W 91–58	7–2	Simon Skjodt Assembly Hall (3,091); Bloomington, IN
December 12, 2021; 7:00 pm, BTN	No. 10	at No. 20 Ohio State	W 86–66	8–2 (2–0)	Value City Arena (3,606); Columbus, OH
December 19, 2021*; 1:00 pm, BTN+	No. 10	Western Michigan	W 67–57	9–2	Simon Skjodt Assembly Hall (2,327); Bloomington, IN
December 21, 2021*; 7:00 pm, BTN+	No. 8	Wright State	Cancelled (COVID-19 pandemic)		Simon Skjodt Assembly Hall; Bloomington, IN
December 23, 2021*; 1:00 pm, BTN+	No. 8	Southern Illinois	W 70–37	10–2	Simon Skjodt Assembly Hall (3,735); Bloomington, IN
December 30, 2021; 8:00 pm, FS1	No. 8	at Rutgers	Postponed due to COVID-19 protocols from Rutgers		Rutgers Athletic Center; Piscataway, NJ
January 2, 2022; 3:00 pm, ESPN2	No. 8	No. 6 Maryland	W 70–63 ^{OT}	11–2 (3–0)	Simon Skjodt Assembly Hall (5,572); Bloomington, IN
January 5, 2022; 7:30 pm, BTN+	No. 6	at Wisconsin	W 76–53	12–2 (4–0)	Kohl Center (2,053); Madison, WI
January 13, 2022; 6:00 pm, BTN	No. 6	Nebraska	W 72–65	13–2 (5–0)	Simon Skjodt Assembly Hall (3,477); Bloomington, IN
January 16, 2022; 2:00 pm, FS1	No. 6	at Purdue; Rivalry / Crimson and Gold Cup	W 73–68 ^{OT}	14–2 (6–0)	Mackey Arena (8,505); West Lafayette, IN
January 19, 2022; 7:00 pm, BTN+	No. 6	Michigan State	Postponed due to COVID-19 protocols from Indiana		Simon Skjodt Assembly Hall; Bloomington, IN
January 27, 2022; 7:00 pm, BTN+	No. 6	Illinois	Postponed due to COVID-19 protocols from Illinois		Simon Skjodt Assembly Hall; Bloomington, IN
January 31, 2022; 7:00 pm, ESPN2	No. 5	at No. 6 Michigan	L 50–65	14–3 (6–1)	Crisler Center (4,198); Ann Arbor, MI
February 3, 2022; 7:00 pm, BTN+	No. 5	Minnesota	W 80–70	15–3 (7–1)	Simon Skjodt Assembly Hall; Bloomington, IN
February 6, 2022; 1:00 pm, BTN+	No. 5	Purdue	W 64–57	16–3 (8–1)	Simon Skjodt Assembly Hall (7,891); Bloomington, IN
February 10, 2022; 8:00 pm, BTN+	No. 7	at Illinois	W 93–61	17–3 (9–1)	State Farm Center (1,198); Champaign, IL
February 12, 2022; 7:00 pm, BTN+	No. 7	Michigan State; Rescheduled from January 19th	W 76–58	18–3 (10–1)	Simon Skjodt Assembly Hall (5,560); Bloomington, IN
February 14, 2022; 7:00 pm, ESPN2	No. 5	at Nebraska	L 55–72	18–4 (10–2)	Pinnacle Bank Arena (4,109); Lincoln, NE
February 17, 2022; 6:00 pm, BTN	No. 5	Northwestern	W 69–58	19–4 (11–2)	Simon Skjodt Assembly Hall (3,632); Bloomington, IN
February 19, 2022; 5:00 pm, BTN+	No. 5	No. 22 Iowa	L 91–96	19–5 (11–3)	Simon Skjodt Assembly Hall (7,052); Bloomington, IN
February 21, 2022; 8:00 pm, BTN	No. 10	at No. 21 Iowa; Rescheduled from January 23rd	L 81–89	19–6 (11–4)	Carver–Hawkeye Arena (7,510); Iowa City, IA
February 25, 2022; 7:00 pm, BTN	No. 10	at No. 13 Maryland	L 64–67	19–7 (11–5)	Xfinity Center (7,532); College Park, MD
Big Ten Women's Tournament
March 3, 2022; 2:00 pm, BTN	(5) No. 14	vs. (13) Rutgers; Second Round	W 66–54	20–7	Gainbridge Fieldhouse; Indianapolis, IN
March 4, 2022; 2:00 pm, BTN	(5) No. 14	vs. (4) No. 11 Maryland; Quarterfinals	W 62–51	21–7	Gainbridge Fieldhouse; Indianapolis, IN
March 5, 2022; 3:30 pm, BTN	(5) No. 14	vs. (1) No. 13 Ohio State; Semifinals	W 70–62	22–7	Gainbridge Fieldhouse; Indianapolis, IN
March 6, 2022; 4:00 pm, ESPN2	(5) No. 14	vs. (2) No. 12 Iowa; Championship game	L 67–74	22–8	Gainbridge Fieldhouse (8,709); Indianapolis, IN
NCAA tournament
March 19, 2022; 1:30 pm, ESPN2	(3 B) No. 11	(14 B) Charlotte; First Round	W 85–51	23–8	Simon Skjodt Assembly Hall (6,389); Bloomington, IN
March 21, 2022; 8:00 pm, ESPNU	(3 B) No. 11	(11 B) No. 25 Princeton; Second Round	W 56–55	24–8	Simon Skjodt Assembly Hall (9,627); Bloomington, IN
March 26, 2022; 2:00 pm, ESPN	(3 B) No. 11	vs. (2 B) No. 5 UConn; Sweet Sixteen	L 58–75	24–9	Total Mortgage Arena (8,502); Bridgeport, CT
*Non-conference game. ^{#}Rankings from AP Poll. (#) Tournament seedings in parentheses. All times are in Eastern Time. Sources:

== Rankings ==
Ranking movements Legend: ██ Increase in ranking ██ Decrease in ranking
	Week																				
Poll	Pre	1	2	3	4	5	6	7	8	9	10	11	12	13	14	15	16	17	18	19	Final
AP	8	4	4	6	10	10	8	8	6	6	6	6									
Coaches	7	7*	6	6	8	7	6	6	6	5	5	6									

* Coaches did not release a week 1 poll.
