= 2021–22 Drexel Dragons women's basketball team =

American college basketball season

2021–22 Drexel Dragons women's basketball

CAA regular season champions

WNIT, Third Round
- Conference: Colonial Athletic Association
- Record: 28–6 (16–2 CAA)
- Head coach: Amy Mallon (2nd season)
- Assistant coaches: Stacy Weiss (10th season); Laura Kurz (2nd season); Jillian Dunston (2nd season)
- MVP: Keishana Washington
- Home arena: Daskalakis Athletic Center

2021–22 CAA women's basketball standings
	Conf.				Overall
Team	W		L	PCT	W		L	PCT
Drexel	16	–	2	.889	28	–	6	.824
Delaware †	15	–	3	.833	25	–	7	.781
Towson	14	–	4	.778	24	–	8	.750
James Madison*	10	–	8	.556	14	–	15	.483
Elon	9	–	9	.500	17	–	12	.586
Charleston	9	–	9	.500	18	–	13	.581
Northeastern	8	–	10	.444	14	–	18	.438
William & Mary	5	–	13	.278	10	–	20	.333
Hofstra	4	–	14	.222	8	–	20	.286
UNC Wilmington	0	–	18	.000	3	–	26	.103
† 2022 CAA tournament winner *Ineligible for the CAA Tournament due to a postseason ban imposed by the CAA.

The 2021–22 Drexel Dragons women's basketball team represented Drexel University during the 2021–22 NCAA Division I women's basketball season. The Dragons, led by second-year head coach Amy Mallon, played their home games at the Daskalakis Athletic Center in Philadelphia, Pennsylvania as members of the Colonial Athletic Association.

== Previous season ==
The Dragons finished the 2020–21 season 14–9, 8–6 in CAA play to finish tied for third place. They defeated Delaware in the CAA tournament championship, and earned an automatic bid to the 2021 NCAA Division I women's basketball tournament.

== Offseason ==
=== Departures ===
Name	Number	Pos.	Height	Year	Hometown	Notes
Kayla Bacon	4	G	5'8"	Senior	Owings Mills, MD	Graduated
Elizabeth Dufrane	14	G	5'8"	Freshman	Falls Church, VA	Transferred to University of Mary Washington

=== Incoming transfers ===
College recruiting information
Name	Hometown	School	Height	Weight	Commit date
Tessa Brugler; F	Nazareth, PA	Bucknell University	6 ft 1 in (1.85 m)	N/A	Apr 1, 2021
Tessa Brugler; F	Recruit ratings: No ratings found				
Overall recruit ranking:
Note: In many cases, Scout, Rivals, 247Sports, On3, and ESPN may conflict in their listings of height and weight.; In these cases, the average was taken. ESPN grades are on a 100-point scale.; Sources: "Drexel 2021 Basketball Commitments". Rivals.; "Drexel Dragons". ESPN.; "2021 Team Ranking". Rivals.

=== 2021 recruiting class ===
College recruiting information
Name	Hometown	School	Height	Weight	Commit date
Momo LaClair; G	Syracuse, NY	Jamesville-DeWitt	5 ft 10 in (1.78 m)	N/A	
Momo LaClair; G	Recruit ratings: No ratings found				
Sira Ba; F	Montreal, Canada	Antoine-de-St-Exupéry	5 ft 11 in (1.80 m)	N/A	
Sira Ba; F	Recruit ratings: No ratings found				
Overall recruit ranking:
Note: In many cases, Scout, Rivals, 247Sports, On3, and ESPN may conflict in their listings of height and weight.; In these cases, the average was taken. ESPN grades are on a 100-point scale.; Sources: "Drexel 2021 Basketball Commitments". Rivals.; "Drexel Dragons". ESPN.; "2021 Team Ranking". Rivals.

== Preseason ==
In a poll of the league coaches, media relations directors, and media members at the CAA's media day, Drexel was picked to finish in first place in the CAA. Hannah Nihill and Keishana Washington were named to the preseason All-CAA first team.

== Roster ==
2021–22 Drexel Dragons women's basketball team
Players
Coaches

Pos.	#	Name	Height	Year	Previous school	Hometown
G	1	Keishana Washington	5 ft 7 in (1.7 m)	Sr	Durham Elite Prep	Pickering, Ontario
F	2	Hetta Saatman	6 ft 2 in (1.88 m)	Jr	Linden Hall	Lancaster, PA
F	3	Tessa Brugler	6 ft 1 in (1.85 m)	RS Sr	Nazareth Area/Bucknell	Nazareth, PA
F	5	Chloe Hodges	6 ft 0 in (1.83 m)	So	St Michael's	Adelaide, Australia
F	10	Brianne Borcky	6 ft 0 in (1.83 m)	Jr	Garnet Valley HS	Glen Mills, PA
G	11	Tori Hyduke	5 ft 6 in (1.68 m)	RS Jr	Rumson-Fair Haven/George Washington	Fair Haven, NJ
G	12	Hannah Nihill	5 ft 3 in (1.6 m)	Sr	Cardinal O'Hara	Drexel Hill, PA
G	13	Erin Sweeney	5 ft 10 in (1.78 m)	So	Archbishop John Carroll HS	Havertown, PA
F	20	Kate Connolly	6 ft 1 in (1.85 m)	Sr	Souderton Area HS	Harleysville, PA
F	21	Jasmine Valentine	5 ft 11 in (1.8 m)	So	St. Vincent Pallotti HS	Odenton, MD
G	22	Maura Hendrixson	5 ft 9 in (1.75 m)	Sr	Cardinal O'Hara HS (PA)	Garnet Valley, PA
G	23	Momo LaClair	5 ft 10 in (1.78 m)	Fr	Jamesville-DeWitt	Syracuse, NY
F	24	Sira Ba	5 ft 11 in (1.8 m)	Fr	Antoine-de-St-Exupéry	Montreal, Canada
F	30	Mariah Leonard	5 ft 10 in (1.78 m)	RS Sr	Broad Run	Ashburn, VA

Head coach

- Amy Mallon (Saint Joseph's)

Assistant coach(es)

- Stacy Weiss (Drexel)
- Laura Kurz (Villanova)
- Jillian Dunston (Michigan)

Legend

- (C) Team captain
- (S) Suspended
- (I) Ineligible
- (W) Walk-on
- Injured
- Current redshirt

Roster
Last update: January 18, 2022

== Schedule and results ==
Date time, TV	Rank^{#}	Opponent^{#}	Result	Record	High points	High rebounds	High assists	Site (attendance) city, state
Exhibition
November 5, 2021*; 7:00 pm		Chestnut Hill	W 61–25		–	–	–	Daskalakis Athletic Center; Philadelphia, PA
Non-conference regular season
November 9, 2022*; 5:00 pm		Marist	L 50–52	0–1	14 – Nihill	14 – Brugler	6 – Nihill	Daskalakis Athletic Center (1,846); Philadelphia, PA
November 12, 2021*; 8:00 pm, NBCSPHI+		Saint Joseph's	W 63–55	1–1	19 – Brugler	7 – Tied	5 – Nihill	Daskalakis Athletic Center (1,351); Philadelphia, PA
November 17, 2021*; 7:00 pm, NBCS+		La Salle	W 71–65	2–1	17 – Brugler	11 – Brugler	7 – Washington	Daskalakis Athletic Center (611); Philadelphia, PA
November 20, 2021*; 2:00 pm		at Maryland Eastern Shore	W 65–60	3–1	16 – Brugler	14 – Leonard	7 – Nihill	Hytche Athletic Center (200); Princess Anne, MD
November 26, 2021*; 7:00 pm, ESPN+		vs. Nebraska; The Dana on Mission Beach Semifinals	L 53–65	3–2	19 – Nihill	10 – Brugler	4 – Washington	Jenny Craig Pavilion (368); San Diego, CA
November 27, 2021*; 5:00 pm		vs. Fresno State; The Dana on Mission Beach 3rd place game	W 63–46	4–2	15 – Nihill	14 – Brugler	7 – Washington	Jenny Craig Pavilion (286); San Diego, CA
November 30, 2021*; 7:00 pm		Dartmouth	W 67–44	5–2	18 – Washington	6 – Nihill	4 – 3 Tied	Daskalakis Athletic Center (502); Philadelphia, PA
December 4, 2021*; 12:00 pm, ESPN3		at Maine	W 57–33	6–2	25 – Washington	8 – Brugler	4 – Nihill	Cross Insurance Center (897); Bangor, ME
December 11, 2021*; 2:00 pm		Longwood	W 79–57	7–2	23 – Nihill	16 – Leonard	7 – Nihill	Daskalakis Athletic Center (524); Philadelphia, PA
December 14, 2021*; 5:00 pm		Yale	W 59–52	8–2	25 – Washington	12 – Brugler	2 – 3 Tied	Daskalakis Athletic Center (1,155); Philadelphia, PA
December 21, 2021*; 1:00 pm		at Delaware State	Postponed due to COVID-19					Memorial Hall; Dover, DE
CAA regular season
January 7, 2022; 7:00 pm		at Charleston	W 61–60	9–2 (1–0)	33 – Washington	13 – Brugler	7 – Tied	TD Arena (203); Charleston, SC
January 9, 2022; 1:00 pm		at UNC Wilmington	W 71–68 ^{OT}	10–2 (2–0)	19 – Washington	13 – Leonard	5 – Nihill	Trask Coliseum (418); Wilmington, NC
January 14, 2022; 7:00 pm		Northeastern	W 63–50	11–2 (3–0)	19 – Brugler	10 – Brugler	5 – Nihill	Daskalakis Athletic Center (626); Philadelphia, PA
January 16, 2022; 2:00 pm		Hofstra	W 72–53	12–2 (4–0)	22 – Washington	5 – Leonard	7 – Nihill	Daskalakis Athletic Center (519); Philadelphia, PA
January 18, 2022; 7:00 pm		Towson	W 58–54	13–2 (5–0)	17 – Washington	12 – Leonard	6 – Hendrixson	Daskalakis Athletic Center (511); Philadelphia, PA
January 23, 2022; 2:00 pm, NBCSPHI		Delaware	W 70–62	14–2 (6–0)	22 – Nihill	7 – Tied	9 – Nihill	Daskalakis Athletic Center (667); Philadelphia, PA
January 28, 2022; 7:00 pm		at Elon	W 72–60	15–2 (7–0)	21 – Nihill	13 – Brugler	5 – Nihill	Schar Center (721); Elon, NC
January 30, 2022; 2:00 pm		at William & Mary	W 75–67 ^{2OT}	16–2 (8–0)	40 – Washington	11 – Leonard	4 – Hendrixson	Kaplan Arena (256); Williamsburg, VA
February 4, 2022; 7:00 pm		UNC Wilmington	W 72–39	17–2 (9–0)	19 – Nihill	4 – Tied	4 – Tied	Daskalakis Athletic Center (620); Philadelphia, PA
February 6, 2022; 1:00 pm		Charleston	L 73–74	17–3 (9–1)	28 – Brugler	12 – Brugler	5 – Nihill	Daskalakis Athletic Center (522); Philadelphia, PA
February 11, 2022; 7:00 pm	No. RV	at Hofstra	W 63–47	18–3 (10–1)	21 – Washington	8 – Tied	7 – Nihill	Hofstra Arena (301); Hempstead, NY
February 13, 2022; 12:00 pm	No. RV	at Northeastern	W 61–46	19–3 (11–1)	19 – Washington	13 – Valentine	6 – Nihill	Cabot Center (209); Boston, MA
February 16, 2022; 5:00 pm		James Madison	W 64–61	20–3 (12–1)	18 – Nihill	7 – Brugler	7 – Hendrixson	Daskalakis Athletic Center (498); Philadelphia, PA
February 20, 2022; 1:00 pm, NBCSPHI		at Delaware	W 65–64	21–3 (13–1)	32 – Washington	9 – Brugler	5 – Nihill	Bob Carpenter Center (1,834); Newark, DE
February 25, 2022; 7:00 pm, NBCSPHI+		William & Mary	W 63–43	22–3 (14–1)	20 – Washington	7 – Brugler	8 – Nihill	Daskalakis Athletic Center (570); Philadelphia, PA
February 27, 2022; 2:00 pm		Elon	W 72–57	23–3 (15–1)	27 – Washington	9 – Brugler	7 – Nihill	Daskalakis Athletic Center; Philadelphia, PA
March 3, 2022; 7:00 pm		at James Madison	W 80–60	24–3 (16–1)	23 – Nihill	9 – Brugler	7 – Tied	Atlantic Union Bank Center (2,549); Harrisonburg, VA
March 5, 2022; 2:00 pm		at Towson	L 61–69	24–4 (16–2)	18 – Nihill	9 – Brugler	5 – Nihill	SECU Arena (816); Towson, MD
CAA Tournament
March 11, 2022; 12:00 pm	(1)	(8) Hofstra; Quarterfinal	W 60–39	25–4	21 – Washington	10 – Brugler	6 – Hendrixson	Daskalakis Athletic Center; Philadelphia, PA
March 12, 2022; 1:00 pm	(1)	(5) Charleston; Semifinal	W 71–65	26–4	25 – Washington	16 – Brugler	9 – Hendrixson	Daskalakis Athletic Center; Philadelphia, PA
March 13, 2022; 1:00 pm	(1)	(2) Delaware; Championship	L 59–63	26–5	22 – Washington	8 – Brugler	5 – Hendrixson	Daskalakis Athletic Center (1,812); Philadelphia, PA
WNIT
March 17, 2022; 6:00 pm		Norfolk State; First round	W 54–47	27–5	16 – Washington	13 – Hendrixson	8 – Hendrixson	Daskalakis Athletic Center (435); Philadelphia, PA
March 21, 2022; 6:00 pm		Bucknell; Second round	W 61–58	28–5	18 – Nihill	7 – Tied	5 – Hendrixson	Daskalakis Athletic Center (667); Philadelphia, PA
March 24, 2022; 7:00 pm		at Seton Hall; Third round	L 71–78	28–6	20 – Nihill	12 – Brugler	4 – Nihill	Walsh Gymnasium (593); South Orange, NJ
*Non-conference game. ^{#}Rankings from AP. (#) Tournament seedings in parentheses. All times are in Eastern Time.

== Awards ==
Brianne Borcky

- Steven Sher Academic Award

Tessa Brugler

- CAA All-Conference Second Team
- City of Basketball Love All–City 6 First Team
- CAA Player of the Week
- Rebounding Award (team leader in rebounds)
- Mo Cronin Spirit & Leadership Award

Maura Hendrixson

- Lil Haas Coaches Award

Mariah Leonard

- Charge Leader Award (team leader in charges drawn)

Amy Mallon

- CAA Coach of the Year

Hannah Nihill

- CAA All-Conference Second Team
- CAA All-Defensive Team
- City of Basketball Love All–City 6 Second Team
- Preseason CAA All-Conference First Team
- Meghan Creighton Assist Award (team leader in assists)
- Team Defensive Player of the Year

Hetta Saatman

- Steven Sher Academic Award

Jasmine Valentine

- Liz Berry Most Improved Award (team's most improved player)

Keishana Washington

- CAA All-Conference First Team
- City of Basketball Love All–City 6 First Team
- CAA Player of the Week (4)
- CAA All-Tournament Team
- CAA Scholar Athlete of the Year
- Preseason CAA All-Conference First Team
- Team Most Valuable Player
- Steven Sher Academic Award

== Rankings ==
+ Regular season polls	Poll	Pre- Season	Week 2	Week 3	Week 4	Week 5	Week 6	Week 7	Week 8	Week 9	Week 10	Week 11	Week 12	Week 13	Week 14	Week 15	Week 16	Week 17	Week 18	Final
AP														RV					N/A	
Coaches													RV	RV	RV	RV	RV	RV		

Legend
	Increase in ranking
	Decrease in ranking
	Not ranked previous week
RV	Received votes
NR	Not ranked
( )	Number of first place votes

== See also ==
- 2021–22 Drexel Dragons men's basketball team
