= 2021–22 Maryland Terrapins women's basketball team =

American college basketball season

2021–22 Maryland Terrapins women's basketball
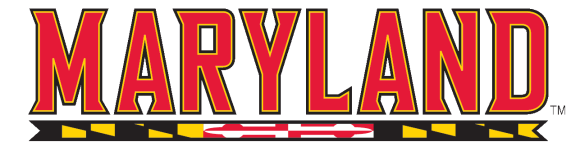

NCAA tournament, Sweet Sixteen
- Conference: Big Ten Conference

Ranking
- Coaches: No. 13
- AP: No. 13
- Record: 23–9 (13–4 Big Ten)
- Head coach: Brenda Frese (20th season)
- Assistant coaches: Karen Blair (4th season); Kaitlynn Fratz (4th season); Lindsey Spann (2nd season)
- Home arena: Xfinity Center

2021–22 Big Ten women's basketball standings
| | Conf. | | | | Overall |
| Team | W | | L | PCT | W | | L | PCT |
|---|---|---|---|---|---|---|---|---|
| No. 14 Ohio State | 14 | – | 4 | .778 | 25 | – | 7 | .781 |
| No. 8 Iowa † | 14 | – | 4 | .778 | 24 | – | 8 | .750 |
| No. 12 Michigan | 13 | – | 4 | .765 | 25 | – | 7 | .781 |
| No. 13 Maryland | 13 | – | 4 | .765 | 23 | – | 9 | .719 |
| No. 11 Indiana | 11 | – | 5 | .688 | 24 | – | 9 | .727 |
| Nebraska | 11 | – | 7 | .611 | 24 | – | 9 | .727 |
| Northwestern | 8 | – | 8 | .500 | 17 | – | 12 | .586 |
| Michigan State | 8 | – | 9 | .471 | 15 | – | 15 | .500 |
| Purdue | 7 | – | 11 | .389 | 17 | – | 15 | .531 |
| Minnesota | 7 | – | 11 | .389 | 15 | – | 18 | .455 |
| Penn State | 5 | – | 13 | .278 | 11 | – | 18 | .379 |
| Wisconsin | 5 | – | 13 | .278 | 8 | – | 21 | .276 |
| Rutgers | 3 | – | 14 | .176 | 11 | – | 20 | .355 |
| Illinois | 1 | – | 13 | .071 | 7 | – | 20 | .259 |
† 2022 Big Ten tournament winner Rankings from AP poll

The 2021–22 Maryland Terrapins women's basketball team represented the University of Maryland, College Park during the 2021–22 NCAA Division I women's basketball season. The Terrapins were led by 20th-year head coach Brenda Frese, and played their home games at the Xfinity Center as a member of the Big Ten Conference.

== Previous season ==
The Terrapins finished the 2020–21 season with a 26–3 record, including 17–1 in Big Ten play, to finish in first place and capturing their sixth Big Ten title. They also won the 2021 Big Ten women's basketball tournament title for the fifth time in school history, and received an automatic bid to the 2021 NCAA Division I women's basketball tournament, where they advanced to the Sweet Sixteen.

== Offseason ==
On May 25, 2021, Maryland signed Brenda Frese to a six-year contract extension through the 2026–27 season.

== Roster ==
2021–22 Maryland Terrapins women's basketball team
Players
Coaches

| Pos. | # | Name | Height | Year | Previous school | Hometown |
|---|---|---|---|---|---|---|
| G | 0 | Shyanne Sellers | 6 ft 2 in (1.88 m) | Fr | Aurora | Aurora, OH |
| G | 1 | Diamond Miller | 6 ft 3 in (1.91 m) | Jr | Franklin | Somerset, NJ |
| F | 2 | Mimi Collins | 6 ft 3 in (1.91 m) | RS Jr | Paul VI Catholic HS; Tennessee | Waldorf, MD |
| G | 3 | Channise Lewis | 5 ft 8 in (1.73 m) | GS | Miami Country Day | Miami, FL |
| F | 10 | Angel Reese | 6 ft 3 in (1.91 m) | So | St. Frances Academy | Baltimore, MD |
| G | 11 | Katie Benzan | 5 ft 6 in (1.68 m) | GS | Noble and Greenough School; Harvard | Wellesley, MA |
| F | 13 | Faith Masonius | 6 ft 1 in (1.85 m) | Jr | Manasquan | Spring Lake, NJ |
| G | 14 | Taisiya Kozlova | 6 ft 1 in (1.85 m) | So | Elevation Prep Academy | Moscow, Russia |
| G | 15 | Ashley Owusu | 6 ft 0 in (1.83 m) | Jr | Paul VI Catholic HS | Woodbridge, VA |
| F | 21 | Emma Chardon | 6 ft 2 in (1.88 m) | Fr | CEC André-Chavanne | Geneva, Switzerland |
| F | 55 | Chloe Bibby | 6 ft 1 in (1.85 m) | GS | Rowville Secondary College; Mississippi State | Warracknabeal, Australia |
| G | -- | Zoe Young | 5 ft 10 in (1.78 m) | RS So | West Des Moines Valley | Des Moines, IA |

Head coach

- Brenda Frese (Arizona)

Assistant coach(es)

- Karen Blair (SMU)
- Kaitlynn Fratz (California (PA))
- Lindsey Spann (Penn State)

Legend

- (C) Team captain
- (S) Suspended
- (I) Ineligible
- (W) Walk-on
- Injured
- Current redshirt

Roster
Last update: October 28, 2021

== Schedule and results ==
| Date time, TV | Rank^{#} | Opponent^{#} | Result | Record | Site (attendance) city, state |
Exhibition
| October 29, 2021*; 6:00 p.m. | No. 4 | Fairmont State | W 120–67 | | Xfinity Center; College Park, MD |
| November 4, 2021*; 6:00 p.m. | No. 4 | Georgian Court | W 125–33 | | Xfinity Center; College Park, MD |
Regular season
| November 9, 2021*; 11:00 a.m., BTN+ | No. 4 | Longwood | W 97–67 | 1–0 | Xfinity Center (4,613); College Park, MD |
| November 12, 2021*; 7:00 p.m., BTN+ | No. 4 | Villanova | W 88—67 | 2–0 | Xfinity Center (5,150); College Park, MD |
| November 14, 2021*; 2:00 p.m. | No. 4 | at James Madison | W 81–45 | 3–0 | Atlantic Union Bank Center (2,887); Harrisonburg, VA |
| November 16, 2021*; 7:00 p.m., BTN+ | No. 3 | Mount St. Mary's | W 98–57 | 4–0 | Xfinity Center (3,683); College Park, MD |
| November 18, 2021*; 6:00 p.m., BTN+ | No. 3 | UNC Wilmington | W 108–66 | 5–0 | Xfinity Center (3,695); College Park, MD |
| November 21, 2021*; 1:00 p.m., BTN | No. 3 | No. 6 Baylor | W 79–76 | 6–0 | Xfinity Center (8,395); College Park, MD |
| November 25, 2021*; 11:00 a.m. | No. 2 | vs. No. 5 NC State; Baha Mar Hoops Pink Flamingo championship | L 60–78 | 6–1 | Baha Mar Convention Center; Nassau, Bahamas |
| November 27, 2021*; 3:00 p.m. | No. 2 | vs. No. 7 Stanford; Baha Mar Hoops Pink Flamingo championship | L 68–86 | 6–2 | Baha Mar Convention Center; Nassau, Bahamas |
| December 2, 2021*; 8:00 p.m., BTN | No. 8 | Miami; ACC–Big Ten Challenge | W 82–74 | 7–2 | Xfinity Center (4,367); College Park, MD |
| December 5, 2021; 2:00 p.m., BTN | No. 8 | at Rutgers | W 73–59 | 8–2 (1–0) | Rutgers Athletic Center (860); Piscataway, NJ |
| December 8, 2021; 7:00 p.m., BTN+ | No. 8 | Purdue | W 86–71 | 9–2 (2–0) | Xfinity Center (4,254); College Park, MD |
| December 12, 2021*; 3:00 p.m., ESPN | No. 8 | at No. 1 South Carolina; Women's Jimmy V Classic | L 59–66 | 9–3 | Colonial Life Arena (12,862); Columbia, SC |
| December 21, 2021*; 11:00 a.m. | No. 6 | at Coppin State | W 98–52 | 10–3 | Physical Education Complex (500); Baltimore, MD |
| December 30, 2021; 8:00 p.m., BTN+ | No. 6 | at Illinois | Postponed due to COVID-19 protocols from Illinois | | State Farm Center; Champaign, IL |
| January 2, 2022; 3:00 p.m., ESPN2 | No. 6 | at No. 8 Indiana | L 63–70 ^{OT} | 10–4 (2–1) | Simon Skjodt Assembly Hall (5,572); Bloomington, IN |
| January 6, 2022; 6:00 p.m., BTN | No. 10 | Penn State | W 106–78 | 11–4 (3–1) | Xfinity Center (4,174); College Park, MD |
| January 9, 2022; 3:00 p.m., BTN+ | No. 10 | at Minnesota | W 87–73 | 12–4 (4–1) | Williams Arena (3,447); Minneapolis, MN |
| January 16, 2022; 5:00 p.m., ESPN | No. 8 | No. 11 Michigan | L 49–69 | 12–5 (4–2) | Xfinity Center (4,189); College Park, MD |
| January 20, 2022; 6:00 p.m., BTN | No. 12 | at Ohio State | L 89–95 | 12–6 (4–3) | Value City Arena (3,319); Columbus, OH |
| January 23, 2022; 1:00 p.m., BTN+ | No. 12 | Northwestern | W 87–59 | 13–6 (5–3) | Xfinity Center (4,940); College Park, MD |
| January 27, 2022; 6:00 p.m., BTN+ | No. 17 | Rutgers | W 72–55 | 14–6 (6–3) | Xfinity Center (3,987); College Park, MD |
| January 30, 2022; 2:00 p.m., BTN+ | No. 17 | at Penn State | W 82–71 | 15–6 (7–3) | Bryce Jordan Center (2,678); University Park, PA |
| February 3, 2022; 6:00 p.m., BTN | No. 17 | at Michigan State | W 67–62 | 16–6 (8–3) | Breslin Center (2,563); East Lansing, MI |
| February 6, 2022; 1:00 p.m., BTN+ | No. 17 | Nebraska | W 80–65 | 17–6 (9–3) | Xfinity Center (6,047); College Park, MD |
| February 9, 2022; 6:00 p.m., BTN+ | No. 15 | Wisconsin | W 70–43 | 18–6 (10–3) | Xfinity Center (4,123); College Park, MD |
| February 14, 2022; 9:00 p.m., ESPN2 | No. 13 | at No. 22 Iowa | W 81–69 | 19–6 (11–3) | Carver–Hawkeye Arena (9,820); Iowa City, IA |
| February 17, 2022; 8:00 p.m., BTN | No. 13 | No. 18 Ohio State | W 77–72 | 20–6 (12–3) | Xfinity Center (4,987); College Park, MD |
| February 20, 2022; 3:00 p.m., BTN | No. 13 | at No. 9 Michigan | L 59–71 | 20–7 (12–4) | Crisler Center (4,987); Ann Arbor, MI |
| February 25, 2022; 8:00 p.m., BTN | No. 13 | No. 10 Indiana | W 67–64 | 21–7 (13–4) | Xfinity Center (7,532); College Park, MD |
Big Ten tournament
| March 4, 2022; 2:00 p.m., BTN | (4) No. 11 | vs. (5) No. 14 Indiana; Quarterfinals | L 51–62 | 21–8 | Gainbridge Fieldhouse; Indianapolis, IN |
NCAA tournament
| March 18, 2022; 5:00 p.m., ESPNU | (4 S) No. 13 | (13 S) Delaware; First round | W 102–71 | 22–8 | Xfinity Center (4,776); College Park, MD |
| March 20, 2022; 3:00 p.m., ESPN | (4 S) No. 13 | (12 S) No. 23 Florida Gulf Coast; Second round | W 89–65 | 23–8 | Xfinity Center (4,575); College Park, MD |
| March 25, 2022; 9:30 p.m., ESPN | (4 S) No. 13 | vs. (1 S) No. 2 Stanford; Sweet Sixteen | L 66–72 | 23–9 | Spokane Arena (7,142); Spokane, WA |
*Non-conference game. ^{#}Rankings from AP poll. (#) Tournament seedings in parentheses. All times are in Eastern.

== Rankings ==
Ranking movements Legend: ██ Increase in ranking ██ Decrease in ranking
| | Week | | | | | | | | | | | | | | | | | | | | |
| Poll | Pre | 1 | 2 | 3 | 4 | 5 | 6 | 7 | 8 | 9 | 10 | 11 | 12 | 13 | 14 | 15 | 16 | 17 | 18 | 19 | Final |
|---|---|---|---|---|---|---|---|---|---|---|---|---|---|---|---|---|---|---|---|---|---|
| AP | 4 | 3 | 2 | 8 | 8 | 9 | 6 | 6 | 10 | 8 | 12 | | | | | | | | | | |
| Coaches | 5 | 5* | 3 | 8 | 7 | 10 | 8 | 8 | 9 | 8 | 11 | | | | | | | | | | |

*Coaches did not release a week 1 poll.
