= Natasha Adair =

American basketball coach (born 1972)

Current position
- Title: Associate head coach
- Team: Syracuse
- Conference: ACC

Biographical details
- Born: September 7, 1972 (age 54); Silver Spring, Maryland, U.S.

Playing career
- 1990–1992: Pensacola JC
- 1992–1994: South Florida
- Position: Power forward

Coaching career (HC unless noted)
- 1998–2004: Georgetown (assistant)
- 2004–2007: Wake Forest (assistant)
- 2007–2012: Wake Forest (associate HC)
- 2012–2014: College of Charleston
- 2014–2017: Georgetown
- 2017–2022: Delaware
- 2022–2025: Arizona State
- 2025–present: Syracuse (associate HC)

Head coaching record
- Overall: 196–205 (.489)
- Tournaments: NCAA: 0–1 (.000); WNIT: 3–3 (.500); WBI: 3–2 (.600)

Natasha Denean Adair (née Barnes; born September 7, 1972) is an American college basketball coach and the current Associate Head Coach for Syracuse. She was the head coach for Arizona State from 2022 to 2025. Adair took over for the Sun Devils after a previous stint at Delaware, appearing in the NCAA Tournament in 2022.

== Playing career ==
Born Natasha Deanean Barnes in Silver Spring, Maryland, she attended Albert Einstein High School, where she was a track star, leading her team to the state championship and the Penn Relays Invitational, before switching to play basketball. She went on to be named as a USA All-American in high school basketball and began to receive interest from several college coaches, namely University of Connecticut's Geno Auriemma.

Following Adair's anterior cruciate ligament injury in 1990, Auriemma did not want her on his team. However, University of South Florida Coach Trudi Lacey called with a plan for Adair to go to Pensacola, Florida, to receive treatment. After the treatment, she could play at Pensacola Junior College and, if recovery went well, transfer to South Florida. Adair went to Pensacola and played the following season, leading her team in rebounding and to two state championships. Lacey monitored her progression, and Adair transferred to South Florida. She graduated with a bachelor's degree in communication and still maintains the single season rebounding record.

== Coaching career ==
Following Adair's playing career, she went on to be an assistant coach at Georgetown (1998–2004) and Wake Forest (2004–2012). At Georgetown, she was primarily responsible for the post players. At Wake Forest, she was recruiting coordinator and post coach, before being promoted to associate head coach in 2007.

== College of Charleston ==
In 2012, Adair became College of Charleston's women's head basketball coach. In her first season there, Adair guided her team to 16 wins and a spot in the Women's Basketball Invitational (WBI) postseason tournament. During the 2013–14 season — the Cougars first in the Colonial Athletic Association – Adair's team had a 19–15 record, marking the third-highest win total in the school's Division I era. The squad finished third in conference play and advanced to the semifinals of both the CAA Championship and the WBI.

== Georgetown ==
In 2014, Adair returned to where she began her coaching career and became the Hoyas' ninth women's head basketball coach. At Georgetown, she turned around a four-win Hoyas program to a postseason contender in three seasons as head coach. Behind Adair's leadership, GU finished 2016–17 with a 17–13 record, the most wins for the Hoyas since 2011–12, and garnered the team's second-straight trip to the Women's National Invitation Tournament.

== Delaware ==
Adair was selected as the fourth head coach in Delaware history on May 14, 2017. In five seasons she compiled a 95–58 record, including two back-to-back 20-win seasons, and captured the program's third CAA title.

In her first season (2017–18) with the Blue Hens, Adair guided Delaware to its second most wins (19) and first postseason appearance since the 2013-14 campaign. Additionally, the Hens captured 10 conference victories for the first time since 2012–13.

In 2020–21, Adair took home the CAA Coach of the Year honors after she helped guide her squad to a regular-season title and a WNIT semifinals appearance, finishing with a 24–5 overall record and 16–2 mark in league play.

On January 7, 2022, Adair reached her 150th-career win against College of Charleston - her first head coaching stop. In 2021–22, she coached the Blue Hens to their first NCAA Tournament appearance in nearly a decade, losing to Maryland in the first round.

== Arizona State ==
On March 27, 2022, Arizona State announced the hiring of Adair to replace Charli Turner Thorne, who retired after leading the Sun Devils for 25 years.

In her three seasons at ASU, Adair coached All-Conference players Tyi Skinner, who follower her from Delaware, and Jalyn Brown. Skinner, who set the single-season program record for 3-pointers in 2024–25, earned All-Pac-12 Honorable Mention recognition in 2023 and All-Big 12 Honorable Mention recognition in 2025. Brown, who was the team's leading scorer in 2023-24 and 2024–25, was named All-Pac-12 Honorable Mention in 2024 and joined Skinner in being named All-Big 12 Honorable Mention in 2025. Both Skinner and Brown scored more than 1,000 points during their time at ASU.

Adair compiled a 29–62 record, never winning more than three conference games in a season and finishing with a 7–47 mark over two seasons in the Pac-12 and one in the Big 12. She was fired March 8, 2025.

== Head coaching record ==
- CAA 2017–18 Women's Basketball Standings

Record table
Season	Team	Overall	Conference	Standing	Postseason
College of Charleston (Southern Conference) (2012–2014)
2012–13	College of Charleston	16–16	11–9	T–5th	WBI second round
College of Charleston (Colonial Athletic Association) (2012–2014)
2013–14	College of Charleston	19–15	9–7	T–3rd	WBI third round
College of Charleston:		35–31 (.530)	20–16 (.556)		
Georgetown (Big East Conference) (2014–2017)
2014–15	Georgetown	4–27	2–16	10th	
2015–16	Georgetown	16–14	9–9	T–5th	WNIT first round
2016–17	Georgetown	17–13	9–9	6th	WNIT first round
Georgetown:		37–54 (.407)	20–34 (.370)		
Delaware (Colonial Athletic Association) (2017–2022)
2017–18	Delaware	19–13	11–7	T–4th	
2018–19	Delaware	16–15	11–7	T–3rd	
2019–20	Delaware	12–17	8–10	T–6th	
2020–21	Delaware	24–5	16–2	1st	WNIT semifinals
2021–22	Delaware	24–8	15–3	2nd	NCAA first round
Delaware:		95–58 (.621)	61–29 (.678)		
Arizona State (Pac-12 Conference) (2022–2024)
2022–23	Arizona State	8–20	1–17	12th	
2023–24	Arizona State	11–20	3–15	11th	
Arizona State (Big 12) (2024–2025)
2024–25	Arizona State	10–22	3–15	15th	
Arizona State:		29–62 (.319)	7–47 (.130)		
Total:		196–205 (.489)			
National champion Postseason invitational champion Conference regular season champion Conference regular season and conference tournament champion Division regular season champion Division regular season and conference tournament champion Conference tournament champion

== Personal life ==
Adair has two children.
