= Big Sky Conference women's basketball tournament =

Women's collegiate conference basketball tournament

- Conference basketball championship
- Sport: Basketball
- Conference: Big Sky Conference
- Number of teams: 11 (since 2019)
- Format: Single-elimination tournament
- Current stadium: Idaho Central Arena
- Current location: Boise, Idaho
- Played: 1989–present 1983–1988 (as MWAC)
- Last contest: 2025
- Current champion: Montana State
- Most championships: Montana (21)
- Official website: BigSkyConf.com; Women's Basketball

Host stadiums
- Campus sites (1983–2015); Reno Events Center (2016–2018); Idaho Central Arena (2019–present)

Host locations
- Campus sites (1983–2015); Reno, Nevada (2016–2018); Boise, Idaho (2019–present)

The Big Sky Conference women's basketball tournament is held at the end of each women's college basketball regular season. The tournament was first conducted by the Big Sky Conference at the end of the 1988–89 season, the first in which the conference sponsored women's sports. The Big Sky includes in its history the preceding six years of the Mountain West Athletic Conference, a women's athletic league consisting mostly of Big Sky members that operated from 1982 to 1988, so the inaugural tournament was in March 1983. (The MWAC of the 1980s is not affiliated with the current Mountain West Conference (MWC), launched in 1999). The tournament winner receives the Big Sky's automatic bid into the NCAA tournament.

Prior to the 1982–83 season, Big Sky members with women's basketball programs housed them in several different conferences. The formation of the MWAC brought the women's sports programs of all Big Sky members under a single umbrella, and the Big Sky ultimately absorbed the MWAC in 1988, incorporating all MWAC statistics and records as its own. From the tournament's inception through the 2015 edition, each matchup was contested on the home court of the higher seed, a practice also used by the Big Sky men's tournament. The 2016 men's and women's tournaments were the first to be held at a predetermined neutral site, with both held at the Reno Events Center in Reno, Nevada.

On September 18, 2017, the Big Sky Conference announced that its men's and women's basketball tournaments would move to the venue now known as Idaho Central Arena for three years, starting in 2019. The hosting contract has since been extended twice, with the most recent extension running through 2031.

Starting in 1986, an MVP was selected at the conclusion of the championship game. In 1989 (the first under the Big Sky name), the conference added all-conference team honors, in addition to the MVP.

The dominant program has been Montana, with 21 titles through 2024; next is Idaho State with four.

== Results ==
| Year | Champions | Score | Runner-up | Location |
Mountain West Athletic Conference
| 1983 | Montana (1) | 66–63 | Weber State | Missoula, Montana |
| 1984 | Montana (2) | 77–62 | Eastern Washington | Missoula, Montana |
| 1985 | Idaho (1) | 80–57 | Montana | Moscow, Idaho |
| 1986 | Montana (3) | 65–39 | Eastern Washington | Missoula, Montana |
| 1987 | Eastern Washington (1) | 77–74 | Montana | Missoula, Montana |
| 1988 | Montana (4) | 79–53 | Eastern Washington | Missoula, Montana |
Big Sky Conference
| 1989 | Montana (5) | 63–49 | Idaho | Missoula, Montana |
| 1990 | Montana (6) | 64–49 | Idaho | Missoula, Montana |
| 1991 | Montana (7) | 77–49 | Montana State | Missoula, Montana |
| 1992 | Montana (8) | 82–67 | Boise State | Boise, Idaho |
| 1993 | Montana State (1) | 64–57 | Montana | Bozeman, Montana |
| 1994 | Montana (9) | 81–65 | Boise State | Missoula, Montana |
| 1995 | Montana (10) | 75–57 | Montana State | Missoula, Montana |
| 1996 | Montana (11) | 72–60 | Weber State | Missoula, Montana |
| 1997 | Montana (12) | 52–49 | Montana State | Missoula, Montana |
| 1998 | Montana (13) | 58–48 | Northern Arizona | Missoula, Montana |
| 1999 | Cal State Northridge (1) | 79–65 | Portland State | Northridge, California |
| 2000 | Montana (14) | 66–53 | Cal State Northridge | Missoula, Montana |
| 2001 | Idaho State (1) | 68–59 | Montana | Pocatello, Idaho |
| 2002 | Weber State (1) | 53–47 | Montana State | Ogden, Utah |
| 2003 | Weber State (2) | 62–53 | Montana State | Ogden, Utah |
| 2004 | Montana (15) | 66–62 | Idaho State | Missoula, Montana |
| 2005 | Montana (16) | 81–64 | Weber State | Missoula, Montana |
| 2006 | Northern Arizona (1) | 74–59 | Weber State | Pocatello, Idaho |
| 2007 | Idaho State (2) | 84–78 | Northern Arizona | Missoula, Montana |
| 2008 | Montana (17) | 101–65 | Montana State | Missoula, Montana |
| 2009 | Montana (18) | 69–62 | Portland State | Missoula, Montana |
| 2010 | Portland State (1) | 62–58 | Montana State | Cheney, Washington |
| 2011 | Montana (19) | 62–58 | Portland State | Portland, Oregon |
| 2012 | Idaho State (3) | 49–46 | Northern Colorado | Pocatello, Idaho |
| 2013 | Montana (20) | 56–43 | Northern Colorado | Missoula, Montana |
| 2014 | North Dakota (1) | 72–55 | Montana | Grand Forks, North Dakota |
| 2015 | Montana (21) | 60–49 | Northern Colorado | Missoula, Montana |
| 2016 | Idaho (2) | 67–55 | Idaho State | Reno, Nevada |
| 2017 | Montana State (2) | 62–56 | Idaho State | Reno, Nevada |
| 2018 | Northern Colorado (1) | 91–69 | Idaho | Reno, Nevada |
| 2019 | Portland State (2) | 61–59 | Eastern Washington | Boise, Idaho |
| 2020 | Final (Montana State, Idaho) cancelled; COVID-19 pandemic. | | | Boise, Idaho |
| 2021 | Idaho State (4) | 84–49 | Idaho | Boise, Idaho |
| 2022 | Montana State (3) | 75–64 | Northern Arizona | Boise, Idaho |
| 2023 | Sacramento State (3) | 76–63 | Northern Arizona | Boise, Idaho |
| 2024 | Eastern Washington (2) | 73–64 | Northern Arizona | Boise, Idaho |
| 2025 | Montana State (4) | 58–57 | Montana | Boise, Idaho |
| 2026 | Idaho (3) | 60-57 | Montana State | Boise, Idaho |
| 2027 | | | | Boise, Idaho |
| 2028 | | | | Boise, Idaho |
| 2029 | | | | Boise, Idaho |
| 2030 | | | | Boise, Idaho |
| 2031 | | | | Boise, Idaho |

== Champions ==
| School | Championships | Championship Years |
|---|---|---|
| Montana | 21 | 1983, 1984, 1986, 1988, 1989, 1990, 1991, 1992, 1994, 1995, 1996, 1997, 1998, 2000, 2004, 2005, 2008, 2009, 2011, 2013, 2015 |
| Idaho State | 4 | 2001, 2007, 2012, 2021 |
| Montana State | 4 | 1993, 2017, 2022, 2025 |
| Idaho | 3 | 1985, 2016, 2026 |
| Eastern Washington | 2 | 1987, 2024 |
| Portland State | 2 | 2010, 2019 |
| Weber State | 2 | 2002, 2003 |
| Northern Arizona | 1 | 2006 |
| Northern Colorado | 1 | 2018 |
| Sacramento State | 1 | 2023 |
| Cal State Northridge | 1 | 1999 |
| North Dakota | 1 | 2014 |

- Boise State, Nevada, and Southern Utah never won the tournament as Big Sky members. Southern Utah will return to the conference in 2026–27.
- Schools highlighted in pink are former members of the Big Sky, as of the 2026–27 season.

== See also ==
- Big Sky Conference men's basketball tournament
