= 2023–24 Sacramento State Hornets women's basketball team =

American college basketball season

2023–24 Sacramento State Hornets women's basketball
- Conference: Big Sky Conference
- Record: 6–25 (4–14 Big Sky)
- Head coach: Aaron Kallhoff (1st season)
- Assistant coaches: De'Audra Brown; Jodi Page; Asha Thomas
- Home arena: Hornets Nest

2023–24 Big Sky women's basketball standings
	Conf.				Overall
Team	W		L	PCT	W		L	PCT
Eastern Washington †	16	–	2	.889	29	–	6	.829
Northern Arizona	15	–	3	.833	25	–	9	.735
Montana	13	–	5	.722	23	–	10	.697
Montana State	10	–	8	.556	17	–	16	.515
Northern Colorado	10	–	8	.556	15	–	16	.484
Idaho	8	–	10	.444	15	–	16	.484
Idaho State	7	–	11	.389	11	–	19	.367
Sacramento State	4	–	14	.222	6	–	25	.194
Weber State	4	–	14	.222	8	–	25	.242
Portland State	3	–	15	.167	8	–	23	.258
† 2024 Big Sky tournament winner

The 2023–24 Sacramento State Hornets women's basketball team represented California State University, Sacramento during the 2023–24 NCAA Division I women's basketball season. The Hornets, led by first-year head coach Aaron Kallhoff, played their home games at the Hornets Nest in Sacramento, California as members of the Big Sky Conference.

The Hornets finished the season 6–25, 4–14 in Big Sky play, to finish in a tie for eighth place. In the Big Sky tournament, they defeated Idaho State in the first round before falling to Northern Arizona in the quarterfinals.

== Previous season ==
The Hornets finished the 2022–23 season 25–8, 13–5 in Big Sky play, to finish in a three-way tie for first place. Due to tiebreakers, they received the #3 seed in the Big Sky tournament, where they defeated #6 seed Idaho in the quarterfinals, #7 seed Portland State in the semifinals, and top-seeded Northern Arizona to win the Big Sky tournament championship for the first time in program and earned the Big Sky's automatic bid into the NCAA tournament. They received the #13 seed in the Greenville 1 Region. They were defeated by #4 region seed UCLA in the first round.

On March 21, 2023, head coach Mark Campbell announced that he would be stepping down, in order to take the head coaching position at TCU. On April 19, the school announced the hiring of BYU assistant coach Aaron Kallhoff as the team's next head coach.

== Roster ==
2023–24 Sacramento State Hornets women's basketball team
Players
Coaches

Pos.	#	Name	Height	Year	Previous school	Hometown
F	0	Ayanna Jackson	6 ft 1 in (1.85 m)	Fr	Example Academy	Chicago, IL
G	1	Benthe Versteeg	5 ft 9 in (1.75 m)	RS So	Landslake Lions	Amsterdam-Zuid, Netherlands
G	2	Kaylie Edge	5 ft 10 in (1.78 m)	So	Salesian College Prep	Richmond, CA
F	3	Solape Amusan	6 ft 2 in (1.88 m)	Sr	Illinois	Woodbury, MN
C	4	Paula Haw	6 ft 5 in (1.96 m)	Fr	Deutschhaus Gymnasium	Munich, Germany
G	5	J'yana Salton	5 ft 9 in (1.75 m)	Fr	Porter Ridge High School	Charlotte, NC
G/F	10	Madison Butcher	5 ft 10 in (1.78 m)	So	Del Oro High School	Loomis, CA
F	14	Summah Hanson	6 ft 2 in (1.88 m)	Fr	BA Centre of Excellence	Brisbane, Australia
G	15	Sofia Alonso	5 ft 8 in (1.73 m)	Fr	IES Emilio Ferrari	Valladolid, Spain
G	20	Seilala Lautaimi	5 ft 10 in (1.78 m)	Jr	Skyline College	San Mateo, CA
G	22	Lina Falk	6 ft 1 in (1.85 m)	Fr	Große Schule Wolfenbüttel	Wolfenbüttel, Germany
F	23	Celestine Segretain	6 ft 0 in (1.83 m)	Fr	Lycee Chevrollier	Angers, France
G	24	Sophia Lee	5 ft 7 in (1.7 m)	RS Fr	BYU	Stockton, CA
G/F	31	Irune Orio	6 ft 2 in (1.88 m)	So	IES Balmaseda BHI	Balmaseda, Spain

Head coach

- Aaron Kallhoff (Bemidji State)

Assistant coach(es)

- De'Audra Brown (Elizabeth City State)
- Jodi Page (Central Queensland)
- Asha Thomas (California)

Legend

- (C) Team captain
- (S) Suspended
- (I) Ineligible
- (W) Walk-on
- Injured
- Current redshirt

Roster
Last update: January 5, 2024

== Schedule and results ==
Date time, TV	Rank^{#}	Opponent^{#}	Result	Record	High points	High rebounds	High assists	Site (attendance) city, state
Regular season
November 6, 2023*; 5:30 p.m., P12N		at Washington	L 28–76	0–1	8 – 2 tied	6 – Hanson	2 – 2 tied	Alaska Airlines Arena (1,864); Seattle, WA
November 9, 2023*; 6:30 p.m., NSN/MWN		at Nevada	L 53–69	0–2	22 – Hanson	11 – Hanson	8 – Versteeg	Lawlor Events Center (1,219); Reno, NV
November 12, 2023*; 2:00 p.m., ESPN+		Cal State Fullerton	L 51–61	0–3	18 – Hanson	11 – Hanson	3 – 2 tied	Hornets Nest (415); Sacramento, CA
November 18, 2023*; 2:00 p.m., ESPN+		San Diego State	L 45–68	0–4	19 – Hanson	11 – Hanson	7 – Versteeg	Hornets Nest (316); Sacramento, CA
November 21, 2023*; 6:30 p.m., ESPN+		UC Davis	L 57–79	0–5	12 – Lautaimi	9 – Haw	4 – Versteeg	Hornets Nest (424); Sacramento, CA
November 29, 2023*; 6:30 p.m., ESPN+		Santa Clara	L 65–70	0–6	18 – Amusan	7 – Hanson	10 – Versteeg	Hornets Nest (309); Sacramento, CA
December 2, 2023*; 2:00 p.m., ESPN+		Cal State Northridge	W 58–48	1–6	20 – Hanson	11 – Hanson	9 – Versteeg	Hornets Nest (304); Sacramento, CA
December 16, 2023*; 2:00 p.m., MWN		at Fresno State	L 47–68	1–7	15 – Hanson	16 – Hanson	4 – Versteeg	Save Mart Center (2,722); Fresno, CA
December 21, 2023*; 11:00 a.m., ESPN+		Cal Poly	L 55–72	1–8	15 – Versteeg	5 – Hanson	6 – Versteeg	Hornets Nest (429); Sacramento, CA
December 28, 2023; 6:30 p.m., ESPN+		Idaho	L 51–88	1–9 (0–1)	17 – Versteeg	7 – 2 tied	2 – 2 tied	Hornets Nest (347); Sacramento, CA
December 30, 2023; 2:00 p.m., ESPN+		Eastern Washington	L 33–60	1–10 (0–2)	12 – Versteeg	10 – Amusan	2 – Versteeg	Hornets Nest (329); Sacramento, CA
January 3, 2023*; 5:00 p.m., MidcoSN+		at St. Thomas; Big Sky–Summit League Challenge	L 52–70	1–11	15 – Hanson	6 – Hanson	6 – Versteeg	Schoenecker Arena (623); St. Paul, MN
January 6, 2024*; 2:00 p.m., ESPN+		Oral Roberts; Big Sky–Summit League Challenge	L 51–56	1–12	14 – 2 tied	9 – Hanson	9 – Versteeg	Hornets Nest (505); Sacramento, CA
January 11, 2024; 6:00 p.m., ESPN+		at Weber State	L 61–81	1–13 (0–3)	28 – Hanson	10 – Hanson	9 – Versteeg	Dee Events Center (221); Ogden, UT
January 13, 2024; 1:00 p.m., ESPN+		at Idaho State	L 48–62	1–14 (0–4)	12 – Orio	11 – Hanson	7 – Versteeg	Reed Gym (779); Pocatello, ID
January 18, 2024; 6:30 p.m., ESPN+		Northern Colorado	L 59–72	1–15 (0–5)	14 – Versteeg	6 – Lautaimi	6 – Versteeg	Hornets Nest (348); Sacramento, CA
January 20, 2024; 11:00 a.m., ESPN+		Northern Arizona	L 66–83	1–16 (0–6)	26 – Versteeg	7 – Hanson	4 – Versteeg	Hornets Nest (334); Sacramento, CA
January 25, 2024; 6:00 p.m., ESPN+		at Montana State	L 54–60	1–17 (0–7)	12 – Falk	10 – Jackson	8 – Versteeg	Worthington Arena (1,768); Bozeman, MT
January 27, 2024; 1:00 p.m., ESPN+		at Montana	L 57–84	1–18 (0–8)	19 – Amusan	8 – Falk	5 – Versteeg	Dahlberg Arena (2,781); Missoula, MT
February 3, 2024; 2:00 p.m., ESPN+		Portland State	W 72–65	2–18 (1–8)	23 – Amusan	12 – Hanson	8 – Versteeg	Hornets Nest (421); Sacramento, CA
February 5, 2024; 7:00 p.m., ESPN+		at Idaho	L 64–70	2–19 (1–9)	23 – Hanson	9 – Orio	6 – Versteeg	ICCU Arena (1,237); Moscow, ID
February 8, 2024; 6:30 p.m., ESPN+		Idaho State	W 61–58	3–19 (2–9)	18 – Amusan	11 – Hanson	9 – Versteeg	Hornets Nest (405); Sacramento, CA
February 10, 2024; 2:00 p.m., ESPN+		Weber State	W 75–44	4–19 (3–9)	26 – Versteeg	13 – Hanson	14 – Versteeg	Hornets Nest (469); Sacramento, CA
February 15, 2024; 6:00 p.m., ESPN+		at Northern Arizona	W 82–66	5–19 (4–9)	18 – Versteeg	12 – Orio	13 – Versteeg	Findlay Toyota Court (342); Flagstaff, AZ
February 17, 2024; 1:00 p.m., ESPN+		at Northern Colorado	L 59–65	5–20 (4–10)	13 – Amusan	5 – Falk	7 – Versteeg	Bank of Colorado Arena (809); Greeley, CO
February 22, 2024; 6:30 p.m., ESPN+		Montana	L 57–58	5–21 (4–11)	21 – Hanson	11 – Hanson	4 – Orio	Hornets Nest (845); Sacramento, CA
February 24, 2024; 1:00 p.m., ESPN+		Montana State	L 51–55	5–22 (4–12)	13 – Hanson	12 – Hanson	5 – Versteeg	Hornets Nest (455); Sacramento, CA
March 2, 2024; 2:00 p.m., ESPN+		at Portland State	L 51–57	5–23 (4–13)	17 – Orio	9 – Hanson	5 – Versteeg	Viking Pavilion (526); Portland, OR
March 4, 2024; 6:00 p.m., ESPN+		at Eastern Washington	L 59–72	5–24 (4–14)	16 – Versteeg	8 – Hanson	10 – Versteeg	Reese Court (823); Cheney, WA
Big Sky tournament
March 9, 2024; 1:30 p.m., ESPN+	(8)	vs. (7) Idaho State; First round	W 73–55	6–24	19 – Orio	9 – Hanson	12 – Versteeg	Idaho Central Arena; Boise, ID
March 10, 2024; 1:30 p.m., ESPN+	(8)	vs. (2) Northern Arizona; Quarterfinals	L 63–81	6–25	19 – Versteeg	11 – Hanson	7 – Versteeg	Idaho Central Arena; Boise, ID
*Non-conference game. ^{#}Rankings from AP poll. (#) Tournament seedings in parentheses. All times are in Pacific.
