= 2023–24 Idaho Vandals women's basketball team =

American college basketball season

2023–24 Idaho Vandals women's basketball
- Conference: Big Sky Conference
- Record: 15–16 (8–10 Big Sky)
- Head coach: Carrie Eighmey (1st season)
- Associate head coach: Arthur Moreira
- Assistant coaches: Drew Muscatell; Devin Eighmey
- Home arena: ICCU Arena

2023–24 Big Sky women's basketball standings
	Conf.				Overall
Team	W		L	PCT	W		L	PCT
Eastern Washington †	16	–	2	.889	29	–	6	.829
Northern Arizona	15	–	3	.833	25	–	9	.735
Montana	13	–	5	.722	23	–	10	.697
Montana State	10	–	8	.556	17	–	16	.515
Northern Colorado	10	–	8	.556	15	–	16	.484
Idaho	8	–	10	.444	15	–	16	.484
Idaho State	7	–	11	.389	11	–	19	.367
Sacramento State	4	–	14	.222	6	–	25	.194
Weber State	4	–	14	.222	8	–	25	.242
Portland State	3	–	15	.167	8	–	23	.258
† 2024 Big Sky tournament winner

The 2023–24 Idaho Vandals women's basketball team represented the University of Idaho during the 2023–24 NCAA Division I women's basketball season. The Vandals, led by first-year head coach Carrie Eighmey, played their home games at Idaho Central Credit Union Arena in Moscow, Idaho as members of the Big Sky Conference.

== Previous season ==
The Vandals finished the 2022–23 season 13–17, 9–9 in Big Sky play, to finish in sixth place. As the #6 seed in the Big Sky tournament, they were defeated by #3 seed and eventual tournament champions Sacramento State in the quarterfinals.

On April 6, 2023, the school announced that they agreed to mutually part ways with head coach Jon Newlee, ending his 15-year tenure with the team. On April 28, Nebraska–Kearney head coach Carrie Eighmey was named the Vandals' next head coach.

== Roster ==
2023–24 Idaho Vandals women's basketball team
Players
Coaches

Pos.	#	Name	Height	Year	Previous school	Hometown
G	0	Jenna Kilty	5 ft 10 in (1.78 m)	Sr	Portland State	Oakland, CA
G	1	Sarah Schmitt	5 ft 8 in (1.73 m)	GS	Nebraska–Kearney	Swisher, IA
F	2	Sarah Brans	6 ft 1 in (1.85 m)	So	Monte Vista High School	Dublin, CA
G	3	Ashlyn Wallace	5 ft 6 in (1.68 m)	Jr	Clarkston High School	Lapwai, ID
G	5	Amalie Langer	5 ft 9 in (1.75 m)	GS	San Francisco	Rungsted, Denmark
G	10	Michala Bork	5 ft 10 in (1.78 m)	So	Laramie County Community College	Gentofte, Denmark
F	11	Hope Butera	6 ft 3 in (1.91 m)	GS	FIU	Kigali, Rwanda
G	13	Jaiden Bea	5 ft 11 in (1.8 m)	So	Washougal High School	Washougal, WA
F	20	Georgia Gray	6 ft 3 in (1.91 m)	Jr	Dodge City Community College	Melbourne, Australia
G	21	Kennedy Johnson	5 ft 11 in (1.8 m)	Jr	UC Santa Barbara	Hayward, CA
G	22	Madelynn Muniz	5 ft 10 in (1.78 m)	Fr	Boulder Creek High School	Phoenix, AZ
G	23	Asha Phillips	5 ft 11 in (1.8 m)	So	North Nowra High School	North Nowra, Australia
G	24	Aspen Caldwell	5 ft 7 in (1.7 m)	Fr	Thunder Ridge High School	Idaho Falls, ID
F	25	Skylar Bea	5 ft 11 in (1.8 m)	Jr	Washougal High School	Washougal, WA

Head coach

- Carrie Eighmey (Hastings)

Assistant coach(es)

- Arthur Moreira (Sonoma State)
- Drew Muscatell (Oregon)
- Devin Eighmey (Peru State)

Legend

- (C) Team captain
- (S) Suspended
- (I) Ineligible
- (W) Walk-on
- Injured
- Current redshirt

Roster
Last update: January 2, 2024

== Schedule and results ==
Date time, TV	Rank^{#}	Opponent^{#}	Result	Record	High points	High rebounds	High assists	Site (attendance) city, state
Regular season
November 6, 2023*; 6:00 p.m., ESPN+		Walla Walla	W 92–50	1–0	18 – Johnson	9 – Butera	5 – Caldwell	ICCU Arena (333); Moscow, ID
November 8, 2023*; 6:00 p.m., ESPN+		Cal Poly	L 55–65	1–1	14 – Phillips	5 – Johnson	3 – Langer	ICCU Arena (186); Moscow, ID
November 17, 2023*; 2:00 p.m.		vs. Cal State Fullerton; Bank of Hawaii Classic	W 56–48	2–1	13 – Wallace	10 – Butera	3 – 3 tied	Stan Sheriff Center (100); Honolulu, HI
November 19, 2023*; 7:00 p.m., ESPN+		at Hawaii; Bank of Hawaii Classic	W 50–40	3–1	12 – Brans	12 – Johnson	2 – Langer	Stan Sheriff Center (1,620); Honolulu, HI
November 25, 2023*; 1:00 p.m., ESPN+		Utah Valley	L 59–66	3–2	14 – Butera	14 – Butera	2 – 3 tied	ICCU Arena (1,057); Moscow, ID
November 29, 2023*; 10:00 a.m., MWN		at Utah State	W 70–43	4–2	16 – Langer	8 – Johnson	8 – Schmitt	Smith Spectrum (3,225); Logan, UT
December 1, 2023*; 6:00 p.m., ESPN+		Texas A&M–Commerce	L 71–72	4–3	23 – Butera	16 – Butera	6 – Schmitt	ICCU Arena (1,049); Moscow, ID
December 8, 2023*; 6:00 p.m., P12N		at Oregon	L 51–59	4–4	15 – Johnson	6 – Johnson	5 – Langer	Matthew Knight Arena (5,153); Eugene, OR
December 17, 2023*; 2:00 p.m., ESPN+		Grand Canyon	L 63–65 ^{OT}	4–5	13 – Langer	10 – Johnson	3 – Brans	ICCU Arena (1,034); Moscow, ID
December 19, 2023*; 12:30 p.m., ESPN+		Saint Martin's	W 63–44	5–5	20 – Johnson	12 – Schmitt	5 – Schmitt	ICCU Arena (2,155); Moscow, ID
December 28, 2023; 6:30 p.m., ESPN+		at Sacramento State	W 88–51	6–5 (1–0)	17 – Johnson	10 – Butera	4 – 2 tied	Hornets Nest (347); Sacramento, CA
December 30, 2023; 2:00 p.m., ESPN+		at Portland State	W 61–55	7–5 (2–0)	16 – Johnson	9 – Schmitt	5 – Schmitt	Viking Pavilion (368); Portland, OR
January 3, 2024*; 4:00 p.m., SLN		at Denver; Big Sky–Summit League Challenge	W 60–51	8–5	13 – Schmitt	12 – Butera	3 – Johnson	Hamilton Gymnasium (302); Denver, CO
January 6, 2024*; 11:00 a.m.		at Chicago State	W 80–52	9–5	14 – Kilty	7 – Butera	6 – 2 tied	Jones Convocation Center (43); Chicago, IL
January 13, 2024; 1:00 p.m., ESPN+/SWX		Eastern Washington	L 44–67	9–6 (2–1)	14 – Johnson	6 – Johnson	1 – 3 tied	ICCU Arena (1,045); Moscow, ID
January 18, 2024; 6:00 p.m., ESPN+		Idaho State; Battle of the Domes	L 56–61	9–7 (2–2)	16 – Brans	10 – Johnson	4 – Johnson	ICCU Arena (1,153); Moscow, ID
January 20, 2024; 2:00 p.m., ESPN+		Weber State	L 56–61	9–8 (2–3)	18 – Johnson	8 – Johnson	5 – Schmitt	ICCU Arena (1,109); Moscow, ID
January 25, 2024; 5:00 p.m., ESPN+		at Northern Arizona	L 53–65	9–9 (2–4)	8 – 4 tied	3 – 4 tied	4 – Brans	Findlay Toyota Court (667); Flagstaff, AZ
January 27, 2024; 1:00 p.m., ESPN+		at Northern Colorado	W 60–56	10–9 (3–4)	15 – Schmitt	7 – Phillips	3 – Phillips	Bank of Colorado Arena (608); Greeley, CO
February 1, 2024; 6:00 p.m., ESPN+		Montana	L 68–79	10–10 (3–5)	26 – Johnson	6 – Caldwell	3 – 2 tied	ICCU Arena (1,271); Moscow, ID
February 3, 2024; 2:00 p.m., ESPN+		Montana State	L 46–51	10–11 (3–6)	18 – Phillips	9 – Phillips	2 – 3 tied	ICCU Arena (1,168); Moscow, ID
February 5, 2024; 6:00 p.m., ESPN+		Sacramento State	W 70–64	11–11 (4–6)	21 – Johnson	7 – 3 tied	4 – Phillips	ICCU Arena (1,237); Moscow, ID
February 10, 2024; 2:00 p.m., ESPN/SWX		at Eastern Washington	L 52–62	11–12 (4–7)	16 – Schmitt	8 – 2 tied	2 – Phillips	Reese Court (964); Cheney, WA
February 15, 2024; 5:00 p.m., ESPN+		at Weber State	W 60–47	12–12 (5–7)	15 – Schmitt	8 – Caldwell	3 – 2 tied	Dee Events Center (333); Ogden, UT
February 17, 2024; 1:00 p.m., ESPN+		at Idaho State; Battle of the Domes	W 49–48	13–12 (6–7)	17 – Johnson	7 – Johnson	3 – Brans	Reed Gym (1,037); Pocatello, ID
February 22, 2024; 6:00 p.m., ESPN+		Northern Colorado	L 38–57	13–13 (6–8)	18 – Johnson	9 – Johnson	2 – 2 tied	ICCU Arena (1,069); Moscow, ID
February 24, 2024; 2:00 p.m., ESPN+		Northern Arizona	L 55–60	13–14 (6–9)	18 – Johnson	7 – Johnson	3 – 2 tied	ICCU Arena (1,150); Moscow, ID
February 29, 2024; 6:00 p.m., ESPN+		at Montana State	W 58–53	14–14 (7–9)	15 – Johnson	8 – Langer	6 – Schmitt	Worthington Arena (1,678); Bozeman, MT
March 2, 2024; 1:00 p.m., ESPN+		at Montana	L 48–64	14–15 (7–10)	19 – Johnson	5 – 2 tied	4 – Schmitt	Dahlberg Arena (3,597); Missoula, MT
March 4, 2024; 6:00 p.m., ESPN+		Portland State	W 60–44	15–15 (8–10)	19 – Johnson	10 – Johnson	6 – Wallace	ICCU Arena (1,218); Moscow, ID
Big Sky tournament
March 11, 2024; 2:30 p.m., ESPN+	(6)	vs. (3) Montana; Quarterfinals	L 61–73	15–16	24 – Johnson	9 – Johnson	3 – 2 tied	Idaho Central Arena; Boise, ID
*Non-conference game. ^{#}Rankings from AP poll. (#) Tournament seedings in parentheses. All times are in Pacific.
