= 2023–24 Montana Lady Griz basketball team =

American college basketball season

2023–24 Montana Lady Griz basketball

WNIT, Second Round
- Conference: Big Sky Conference
- Record: 23–10 (13–5 Big Sky)
- Head coach: Brian Holsinger (3rd season)
- Associate head coach: Nate Harris
- Assistant coaches: Joslyn Tinkle; Lindsey Foster; Tiffany Stubbs
- Home arena: Dahlberg Arena

2023–24 Big Sky women's basketball standings
	Conf.				Overall
Team	W		L	PCT	W		L	PCT
Eastern Washington †	16	–	2	.889	29	–	6	.829
Northern Arizona	15	–	3	.833	25	–	9	.735
Montana	13	–	5	.722	23	–	10	.697
Montana State	10	–	8	.556	17	–	16	.515
Northern Colorado	10	–	8	.556	15	–	16	.484
Idaho	8	–	10	.444	15	–	16	.484
Idaho State	7	–	11	.389	11	–	19	.367
Sacramento State	4	–	14	.222	6	–	25	.194
Weber State	4	–	14	.222	8	–	25	.242
Portland State	3	–	15	.167	8	–	23	.258
† 2024 Big Sky tournament winner

The 2023–24 Montana Lady Griz basketball team represented the University of Montana during the 2023–24 NCAA Division I women's basketball season. The Lady Griz, led by third-year head coach Brian Holsinger, played their home games at Dahlberg Arena in Missoula, Montana as members of the Big Sky Conference.

== Previous season ==
The Lady Griz finished the 2022–23 season 14–16, 10–8 in Big Sky play to finish in fifth place. As the #5 seed in the Big Sky tournament, they were defeated by #4 seed Eastern Washington in the quarterfinals.

== Roster ==
2023–24 Montana Lady Griz women's basketball team
Players
Coaches

Pos.	#	Name	Height	Year	Previous school	Hometown
F	00	Keeli Burton-Oliver	6 ft 2 in (1.88 m)	RS So	Washington State	Sammamish, Washington
G	1	Libby Stump	5 ft 8 in (1.73 m)	So	Lynden Christian Schools	Ferndale, Washington
G	2	Mack Konig	5 ft 9 in (1.75 m)	So	King's Christian Collegiate	Milton, Ontario
G	3	Draya Wacker	5 ft 8 in (1.73 m)	RS Fr	Melstone HS	Melstone, Montana
G	10	Haley Huard	6 ft 1 in (1.85 m)	Jr	Valor Christian HS	Highlands Ranch, Colorado
G	11	Macy Donarski	5 ft 8 in (1.73 m)	Fr	Aquinas HS	La Crosse, Wisconsin
G	12	Macey Huard	6 ft 2 in (1.88 m)	Fr	Valor Christian HS	Highlands Ranch, Colorado
G	13	Maggie Espenmiller-McGraw	5 ft 10 in (1.78 m)	Sr	Iowa State	Indianola, Iowa
G	14	Lauren Dick	5 ft 10 in (1.78 m)	So	Hellgate HS	Missoula, Montana
C	15	Imogen Greenslade	6 ft 4 in (1.93 m)	RS Jr	Arizona State	Sydney, Australia
F	20	Carmen Gfeller	6 ft 1 in (1.85 m)	GS	Colfax HS	Colfax, Washington
G	22	Gina Marxen	5 ft 8 in (1.73 m)	Sr	Idaho	Sammamish, Washington
G	23	MJ Bruno	5 ft 11 in (1.8 m)	Jr	Portland	Spokane, Washington
G	33	Adria Lincoln	6 ft 1 in (1.85 m)	Fr	Monroe HS	Monroe, Washington
F	34	Alex Pirog	6 ft 3 in (1.91 m)	So	Highlands Ranch HS	Highlands Ranch, Colorado
F	40	Dani Bartsch	6 ft 2 in (1.88 m)	Jr	Helena HS	Helena, Montana

Head coach

- Brian Holsinger (Western Washington)

Assistant coach(es)

- Nate Harris (Montana Tech)
- Joslyn Tinkle (Stanford)
- Lindsey Foster (La Verne)
- Tiffany Stubbs (Northwestern–St. Paul)

Legend

- (C) Team captain
- (S) Suspended
- (I) Ineligible
- (W) Walk-on
- Injured
- Current redshirt

Roster
Last update: January 2, 2024

== Schedule and results ==
Date time, TV	Rank^{#}	Opponent^{#}	Result	Record	High points	High rebounds	High assists	Site (attendance) city, state
Regular season
November 6, 2023*; 7:00 pm, SWX/ESPN+		Gonzaga	L 70–83	0–1	18 – Bartsch	10 – Bartsch	4 – Konig	Dahlberg Arena (2,603); Missoula, MT
November 14, 2023*; 7:00 pm, ESPN+		No. 24 Washington State	L 49–61	0–2	10 – Gfeller	11 – Bartsch	2 – 2 Tied	Dahlberg Arena (2,359); Missoula, MT
November 20, 2023*; 6:00 pm, ESPN+		at Grand Canyon	W 76–71	1–2	15 – Konig	7 – Bartsch	3 – Marxen	GCU Arena (523); Phoenix, AZ
November 27, 2023*; 7:00 pm, ESPN+		Dickinson State	W 108–57	2–2	23 – Espenmiller-McGraw	12 – Pirog	4 – 4 Tied	Dahlberg Arena (1,924); Missoula, MT
December 6, 2023*; 11:00 am, ESPN+		Loyola Marymount	W 82–68	3–2	24 – Espenmiller-McGraw	7 – Espenmiller-McGraw	4 – Bartsch	Dahlberg Arena (5,911); Missoula, MT
December 9, 2023*; 7:00 pm, ESPN+		Colorado State	L 69–78	3–3	14 – Espenmiller-McGraw	8 – 2 Tied	4 – Marxen	Dahlberg Arena (2,411); Missoula, MT
December 16, 2023*; 7:00 pm, ESPN+		at Cal Poly	W 67–65	4–3	21 – Gfeller	11 – Bartsch	5 – Marxen	Mott Athletics Center (752); San Luis Obispo, CA
December 20, 2023*; 3:00 pm, ESPN+		at San Diego; USD Winter Classic	W 72–52	5–3	21 – Konig	8 – Bartsch	4 – 3 Tied	Jenny Craig Pavilion (232); San Diego, CA
December 21, 2023*; 3:00 pm, ESPN+		vs. UC San Diego; USD Winter Classic	W 68–67	6–3	23 – Bruno	8 – Bruno	6 – Marxen	Jenny Craig Pavilion (138); San Diego, CA
December 29, 2023; 7:00 pm, ESPN+		Weber State	W 87–71	7–3 (1–0)	21 – Espenmiller-McGraw	12 – Bartsch	6 – Marxen	Dahlberg Arena (2,637); Missoula, MT
December 31, 2023; 2:00 pm, ESPN+		Idaho State	W 66–55	8–3 (2–0)	12 – 2 Tied	7 – 2 Tied	4 – Konig	Dahlberg Arena (2,392); Missoula, MT
January 3, 2024*; 7:00 pm, ESPN+		South Dakota; Big Sky-Summit League Challenge	W 74–61	9–3	18 – Gfeller	11 – Bartsch	10 – Marxen	Dahlberg Arena (1,944); Missoula, MT
January 6, 2024*; 1:00 pm		at Omaha; Big Sky-Summit League Challenge	W 81–60	10–3	18 – Gfeller	11 – Bartsch	4 – Marxen	Baxter Arena (564); Omaha, NE
January 11, 2024; 6:00 pm, ESPN+		at Northern Colorado	L 57–67	10–4 (2–1)	19 – Gfeller	9 – Bartsch	5 – Gfeller	Bank of Colorado Arena (587); Greeley, CO
January 13, 2024; 2:00 pm, ESPN+		at Northern Arizona	W 89–84	11–4 (3–1)	24 – Konig	14 – Bartsch	7 – Konig	Findlay Toyota Court (392); Flagstaff, AZ
January 20, 2024; 2:00 pm, ESPN+		at Montana State	L 55–64	11–5 (3–2)	11 – Bartsch	11 – Bartsch	5 – Marxen	Worthington Arena (2,813); Bozeman, MT
January 22, 2024; 6:00 pm, ESPN+		at Weber State	W 87–55	12–5 (4–2)	16 – Konig	9 – Bartsch	5 – Konig	Dee Events Center (280); Ogden, UT
January 25, 2024; 7:00 pm, ESPN+		Portland State	W 87–46	13–5 (5–2)	16 – Gfeller	13 – Bartsch	8 – Marxen	Dahlberg Arena (2,278); Missoula, MT
January 27, 2024; 2:00 pm, ESPN+		Sacramento State	W 84–57	14–5 (6–2)	19 – Espenmiller-McGraw	14 – Bartsch	8 – Konig	Dahlberg Arena (2,781); Missoula, MT
February 1, 2024; 7:00 pm, ESPN+		at Idaho	W 79–68	15–5 (7–2)	24 – Gfeller	8 – Bartsch	6 – Marxen	ICCU Arena (1,271); Moscow, ID
February 3, 2024; 3:00 pm, ESPN+		at Eastern Washington	L 56–61	15–6 (7–3)	16 – Konig	12 – Gfeller	4 – Marxen	Reese Court (592); Cheney, WA
February 8, 2024; 7:00 pm, ESPN+		Northern Arizona	L 60–69	15–7 (7–4)	13 – Konig	15 – Bartsch	4 – Marxen	Dahlberg Arena (2,157); Missoula, MT
February 10, 2024; 2:00 pm, ESPN+		Northern Colorado	W 82–73	16–7 (8–4)	20 – Bartsch	10 – Bartsch	4 – Konig	Dahlberg Arena (2,545); Missoula, MT
February 17, 2024; 2:00 pm, ESPN+		Montana State	W 72–50	17–7 (9–4)	14 – 3 Tied	8 – Bartsch	5 – 2 Tied	Dahlberg Arena (3,955); Missoula, MT
February 22, 2024; 7:30 pm, ESPN+		at Sacramento State	W 58–57	18–7 (10–4)	15 – 2 Tied	17 – Bartsch	4 – Bartsch	Hornets Nest (845); Sacramento, CA
February 24, 2024; 3:00 pm, ESPN+		at Portland State	W 76–65	19–7 (11–4)	19 – Bartsch	12 – Gfeller	8 – Marxen	Viking Pavilion (439); Portland, OR
February 29, 2024; 7:00 pm, ESPN+		Eastern Washington	L 55–56	19–8 (11–5)	15 – Espenmiller-McGraw	12 – 2 Tied	3 – 2 Tied	Dahlberg Arena (3,495); Missoula, MT
March 2, 2024; 2:00 pm, ESPN+		Idaho	W 64-48	20–8 (12–5)	16 – Espenmiller-McGraw	12 – Bartsch	3 – 3 Tied	Dahlberg Arena (3,597); Missoula, MT
March 4, 2024; 7:00 pm, ESPN+		at Idaho State	W 67–65	21–8 (13–5)	26 – Konig	14 – Bartsch	5 – Bartsch	Reed Gym (947); Pocatello, ID
Big Sky tournament
March 11, 2024; 2:30 pm, ESPN+	(3)	vs. (6) Idaho; Quarterfinals	W 73–61	22–8	15 – Espenmiller-McGraw	14 – Bartsch	3 – Konig	Idaho Central Arena; Boise, ID
March 12, 2024; 2:30 pm, ESPN+	(3)	vs. (2) Northern Arizona; Semifinals	L 67–74	22–9	21 – 2 Tied	11 – Bartsch	4 – Marxen	Idaho Central Arena; Boise, ID
WNIT
March 20, 2024*; 7:00 pm, ESPN+		Boise State; First Round	W 67–62	23–9	20 – Espenmiller-McGraw	8 – Bartsch	9 – Marxen	Dahlberg Arena (1,471); Missoula, MT
March 25, 2024*; 6:00 pm		at North Dakota State; Second Round	L 63–72	23–10	24 – Marxen	13 – Bartsch	3 – Bartsch	Scheels Center (2,254); Fargo, ND
*Non-conference game. ^{#}Rankings from AP Poll. (#) Tournament seedings in parentheses. All times are in Mountain.
