= 2023–24 Montana State Bobcats women's basketball team =

American college basketball season

2023–24 Montana State Bobcats women's basketball
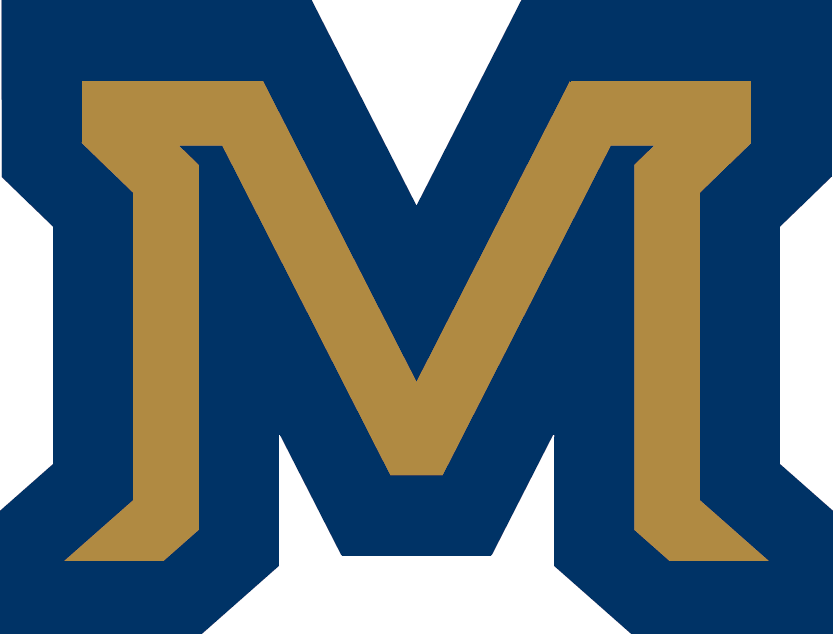
- Conference: Big Sky Conference
- Record: 17–16 (10–8 Big Sky)
- Head coach: Tricia Binford (19th season)
- Assistant coaches: Sunny Smallwood; Ryan Johnson; Devin Perez
- Home arena: Worthington Arena

2023–24 Big Sky women's basketball standings
	Conf.				Overall
Team	W		L	PCT	W		L	PCT
Eastern Washington †	16	–	2	.889	29	–	6	.829
Northern Arizona	15	–	3	.833	25	–	9	.735
Montana	13	–	5	.722	23	–	10	.697
Montana State	10	–	8	.556	17	–	16	.515
Northern Colorado	10	–	8	.556	15	–	16	.484
Idaho	8	–	10	.444	15	–	16	.484
Idaho State	7	–	11	.389	11	–	19	.367
Sacramento State	4	–	14	.222	6	–	25	.194
Weber State	4	–	14	.222	8	–	25	.242
Portland State	3	–	15	.167	8	–	23	.258
† 2024 Big Sky tournament winner

The 2023–24 Montana State Bobcats women's basketball team represented Montana State University during the 2023–24 NCAA Division I women's basketball season. Led by 19th-year head coach Tricia Binford, the bobcats played their home games at Worthington Arena in Bozeman, Montana, as members of the Big Sky Conference.

== Previous season ==
The Bobcats finished the 2022–23 season with a 20–11 overall record and a 13–5 mark in Big Sky play, resulting in a three-way tie for first place. Due to tiebreakers, they received the No. 2 seed in the Big Sky tournament, where they were upset by No. 7 seed Portland State in the quarterfinals.

== Roster ==
2023–24 Montana State Bobcats women's basketball team
Players
Coaches

Pos.	#	Name	Height	Year	Previous school	Hometown
G	0	Madison Hall	5 ft 9 in (1.75 m)	Sr	Parma High School	Parma, ID
G	1	Malea Egan	5 ft 6 in (1.68 m)	Fr	Colstrip High School	Colstrip, MT
G	2	Natalie Picton	5 ft 5 in (1.65 m)	Fr	Niagara Prep Academy	Welland, ON
F	5	Ella Johnson	6 ft 2 in (1.88 m)	Fr	Elk River High School	Elk River, MN
G	11	Katelynn Limardo	6 ft 2 in (1.88 m)	Sr	Silver High School	Silver City, NM
F	13	Drea Brumfield	6 ft 2 in (1.88 m)	So	Pepperdine	Chehalis, WA
G	15	Isobel Bunyan	6 ft 0 in (1.83 m)	Fr	Cardiff Met Archers	Tonyrefail, Wales
G	20	Brooke Berry	6 ft 0 in (1.83 m)	RS Fr	New Mexico	Billings, MT
F	21	Lexi Deden	6 ft 1 in (1.85 m)	Sr	Sentinel High School	Missoula, MT
F	22	Lea Boulanger	6 ft 2 in (1.88 m)	Fr	Champlain College Lennoxville	Saint-Bruno-de-Montarville, QC
G	23	Mattie Olson	5 ft 8 in (1.73 m)	So	Skyline High School	Idaho Falls, ID
F	24	Taylor Janssen	6 ft 3 in (1.91 m)	Sr	Rosemount High School	Rosemount, MN
G	30	Dylan Philip	5 ft 8 in (1.73 m)	So	Ellensburg High School	Ellensburg, WA
F	32	Marah Dykstra	6 ft 2 in (1.88 m)	So	Churchill Secondary School	Vancouver, BC
C	33	Lindsey Hein	6 ft 6 in (1.98 m)	RS So	Forsyth High School	Forsyth, MT

Head coach

- Tricia Binford (Boise State)

Assistant coach(es)

- Sunny Smallwood (Boise State)
- Ryan Johnson (DePauw)
- Devin Perez (Ottawa)

Legend

- (C) Team captain
- (S) Suspended
- (I) Ineligible
- (W) Walk-on
- Injured
- Current redshirt

Roster
Last update: January 2, 2024

== Schedule and results ==
Date time, TV	Rank^{#}	Opponent^{#}	Result	Record	High points	High rebounds	High assists	Site (attendance) city, state
Exhibition
October 28, 2023*; 1:00 p.m.		Lewis–Clark State	W 70–39	–	22 – Deden	14 – Deden	6 – Philip	Worthington Arena; Bozeman, MT
November 4, 2023*; 7:00 p.m.		at Carroll College	W 73–63	–	15 – Limardo	7 – Limardo	4 – Philip	CC PE Center; Helena, MT
Regular season
November 7, 2023*; 11:00 a.m., ESPN+		BYU	L 60–68	0–1	15 – Bunyan	8 – Deden	4 – Dykstra	Worthington Arena (5,017); Bozeman, MT
November 10, 2023*; 6:00 p.m., P12N		at Arizona State	L 62–75	0–2	18 – Limardo	8 – Deden	4 – Dykstra	Desert Financial Arena (1,521); Tempe, AZ
November 14, 2023*; 7:00 p.m., ESPN+		San Jose State	W 62–49	1–2	17 – Limardo	6 – 4 tied	4 – Limardo	Worthington Arena (1,401); Bozeman, MT
November 19, 2023*; 11:00 a.m., MidcoSN+		at North Dakota	W 60–53	2–2	22 – Deden	12 – Limardo	4 – Dykstra	Betty Engelstad Sioux Center (1,169); Grand Forks, ND
November 23, 2023*; 7:00 p.m., FloHoops		vs. New Mexico; Cancún Challenge Riviera Tournament	W 75–57	3–2	23 – Deden	14 – Deden	7 – Dykstra	Hard Rock Hotel Riviera Maya (166); Cancún, Mexico
November 24, 2023*; 7:00 p.m., FloHoops		vs. James Madison; Cancún Challenge Riviera Tournament	L 62–65	3–3	14 – 2 tied	8 – Limardo	4 – Picton	Hard Rock Hotel Riviera Maya (200); Cancún, Mexico
December 2, 2023*; 6:00 p.m., ESPN+		at Portland	L 64–73	3–4	16 – Janssen	10 – Limardo	2 – 6 tied	Chiles Center (525); Portland, OR
December 5, 2023*; 6:00 p.m., P12N		at Washington	L 50–55	3–5	10 – Picton	5 – Bunyan	4 – Dykstra	Alaska Airlines Arena (1,653); Seattle, WA
December 8, 2023*; 7:30 p.m., ESPN+		at Saint Mary's	L 53–59	3–6	14 – Bunyan	7 – Janssen	4 – Limardo	University Credit Union Pavilion (271); Moraga, CA
December 17, 2023*; 12:00 p.m., ESPN+/SWX		Wyoming	W 64–55	4–6	12 – Limardo	7 – Dykstra	3 – Dykstra	Worthington Arena (1,501); Bozeman, MT
December 21, 2023*; 7:00 p.m., ESPN+		North Texas	W 71–58	5–6	25 – Limardo	6 – Limardo	5 – Picton	Worthington Arena (1,396); Bozeman, MT
December 29, 2023; 7:00 p.m., ESPN+		Idaho State	W 58–56	6–6 (1–0)	17 – Hall	7 – Bunyan	5 – Janssen	Worthington Arena (1,908); Bozeman, MT
December 31, 2023; 2:00 p.m., ESPN+		Weber State	W 57–43	7–6 (2–0)	13 – Hall	10 – Limardo	2 – 2 tied	Worthington Arena (1,701); Bozeman, MT
January 3, 2024*; 5:30 p.m., ESPN+		North Dakota State; Big Sky–Summit League Challenge	W 65–45	8–6	17 – Hall	6 – Dykstra	4 – Janssen	Worthington Arena (1,532); Bozeman, MT
January 6, 2024; 1:00 p.m., SLN		at South Dakota State; Big Sky–Summit League Challenge	L 53–61	8–7	14 – Dykstra	4 – Dykstra	4 – Picton	Frost Arena (1,843); Brookings, SD
January 11, 2024; 6:00 p.m., ESPN+		at Northern Arizona	L 73–88	8–8 (2–1)	14 – Hall	7 – Limardo	5 – Bunyan	Findlay Toyota Court (207); Flagstaff, AZ
January 13, 2024; 2:00 p.m., ESPN+		at Northern Colorado	L 53–58	8–9 (2–2)	18 – Limardo	10 – Limardo	2 – 4 tied	Bank of Colorado Arena (732); Greeley, CO
January 20, 2024; 2:00 p.m., ESPN+		Montana	W 64–55	9–9 (3–2)	18 – Hall	10 – Limardo	4 – Hall	Worthington Arena (2,813); Bozeman, MT
January 22, 2024; 7:00 p.m., ESPN+		at Idaho State	L 53–62	9–10 (3–3)	12 – 2 tied	4 – Dykstra	3 – 2 tied	Reed Gym; Pocatello, ID
January 25, 2024; 7:00 p.m., ESPN+		Sacramento State	W 60–54	10–10 (4–3)	12 – Dykstra	14 – Dykstra	3 – Dykstra	Worthington Arena (1,768); Bozeman, MT
January 27, 2024; 2:00 p.m., ESPN+		Portland State	W 71–50	11–10 (5–3)	17 – Dykstra	8 – Johnson	5 – Dykstra	Worthington Arena (2,361); Bozeman, MT
February 1, 2024; 7:00 p.m., ESPN+		at Eastern Washington	W 62–61	12–10 (6–3)	21 – Dykstra	7 – Janssen	3 – 2 tied	Reese Court (539); Cheney, WA
February 3, 2024; 3:00 p.m., ESPN+		at Idaho	W 51–46	13–10 (7–3)	15 – Hall	7 – Dykstra	2 – 2 tied	ICCU Arena (1,168); Moscow, ID
February 8, 2024; 7:00 p.m., ESPN+		Northern Colorado	W 61–40	14–10 (8–3)	19 – Hall	7 – Limardo	5 – Picton	Worthington Arena (1,773); Bozeman, MT
February 10, 2024; 2:00 p.m., ESPN+		Northern Arizona	L 58–71	14–11 (8–4)	18 – Dykstra	4 – 2 tied	2 – 3 tied	Worthington Arena (2,141); Bozeman, MT
February 17, 2024; 2:00 p.m., ESPN+		at Montana	L 50–72	14–12 (8–5)	13 – Dykstra	9 – Dykstra	2 – Picton	Dahlberg Arena (3,955); Missoula, MT
February 22, 2024; 7:00 p.m., ESPN+		at Portland State	L 55–60	14–13 (8–6)	16 – Dykstra	6 – 3 tied	5 – 2 tied	Viking Pavilion (338); Portland, OR
February 24, 2024; 2:00 p.m., ESPN+		at Sacramento State	W 55–51	15–13 (9–6)	13 – Dykstra	7 – Limardo	4 – Janssen	Hornets Nest (455); Sacramento, CA
February 29, 2024; 7:00 p.m., ESPN+		Idaho	L 53–58	15–14 (9–7)	16 – Dykstra	9 – Limardo	4 – Limardo	Worthington Arena (1,678); Bozeman, MT
March 2, 2024; 2:00 p.m., ESPN+		Eastern Washington	L 50–52	15–15 (9–8)	13 – Limardo	8 – Janssen	4 – Janssen	Worthington Arena (2,007); Bozeman, MT
March 4, 2024; 6:00 p.m., ESPN+		at Weber State	W 67–65	16–15 (10–8)	20 – Dykstra	7 – Dykstra	4 – 2 tied	Dee Events Center (370); Ogden, UT
Big Sky tournament
March 11, 2024; 12:00 p.m., ESPN+	(4)	vs. (5) Northern Colorado; Quarterfinals	W 47–44 ^{OT}	17–15	11 – 3 tied	6 – 2 tied	2 – 2 tied	Idaho Central Arena; Boise, ID
March 12, 2024; 12:00 p.m., ESPN+	(4)	vs. (1) Eastern Washington; Semifinals	L 39–56	17–16	9 – Limardo	6 – Dykstra	2 – 3 tied	Idaho Central Arena; Boise, ID
*Non-conference game. ^{#}Rankings from AP poll. (#) Tournament seedings in parentheses. All times are in Mountain.
