= 2023–24 Eastern Washington Eagles women's basketball team =

American college basketball season

2023–24 Eastern Washington Eagles women's basketball

Big Sky regular season and tournament champions

NCAA Tournament, First Round
- Conference: Big Sky Conference
- Record: 29–6 (16–2 Big Sky)
- Head coach: Joddie Gleason (3rd season)
- Associate head coach: Skip Gleason
- Assistant coaches: Brandon Morrison; Jordan Loera
- Home arena: Reese Court

2023–24 Big Sky women's basketball standings
	Conf.				Overall
Team	W		L	PCT	W		L	PCT
Eastern Washington †	16	–	2	.889	29	–	6	.829
Northern Arizona	15	–	3	.833	25	–	9	.735
Montana	13	–	5	.722	23	–	10	.697
Montana State	10	–	8	.556	17	–	16	.515
Northern Colorado	10	–	8	.556	15	–	16	.484
Idaho	8	–	10	.444	15	–	16	.484
Idaho State	7	–	11	.389	11	–	19	.367
Sacramento State	4	–	14	.222	6	–	25	.194
Weber State	4	–	14	.222	8	–	25	.242
Portland State	3	–	15	.167	8	–	23	.258
† 2024 Big Sky tournament winner

The 2023–24 Eastern Washington Eagles women's basketball team represented Eastern Washington University during the 2023–24 NCAA Division I women's basketball season. The Eagles, led by third-year head coach Joddie Gleason, played their home games at Reese Court in Cheney, Washington as members of the Big Sky Conference.

== Previous season ==
The Eagles finished the 2022–23 season 19–11, 11–7 in Big Sky play to finish in fourth place. As the #4 seed in the Big Sky tournament, they defeated #5 seed Montana in the quarterfinals, before falling to top-seeded Northern Arizona in the semifinals.

== Roster ==
2023–24 Eastern Washington Eagles women's basketball team
Players
Coaches

Pos.	#	Name	Height	Year	Previous school	Hometown
PG	1	Alexis Pettis	5 ft 5 in (1.65 m)	Jr	Palisades Charter High School	Gardena, California
G	2	Ella Gallatin	5 ft 10 in (1.78 m)	So	Snohomish High School	Snohomish, Washington
G	3	Ellie Boni	5 ft 9 in (1.75 m)	RS So	San Jose State	Spokane Valley, Washington
SG	4	Devynn Warns	5 ft 7 in (1.7 m)	Jr	Liberty High School	Renton, Washington
G	5	Breeje Schuler	5 ft 10 in (1.78 m)	So	St Peter's School, Cambridge	Te Aroha, New Zealand
G	10	Jacinta Buckley	6 ft 1 in (1.85 m)	Sr	UNLV	Spokane, Washington
PG	12	Andie Zylak	5 ft 7 in (1.7 m)	Jr	Lewis and Clark High School	Spokane, Washington
PF	14	Cori Wilcox	6 ft 2 in (1.88 m)	RS Fr	Lake Stevens High School	Lake Stevens, Washington
G	15	Jamie Loera	5 ft 9 in (1.75 m)	GS	Arizona State	Moses Lake, Washington
PF	21	Milly Knowles	6 ft 1 in (1.85 m)	GS	Myerscough College	Barrow-in-Furness, England
SF	23	Jaydia Martin	6 ft 0 in (1.83 m)	Jr	Hudson's Bay High School	Vancouver, Washington
G	24	Jaleesa Lawrence	5 ft 10 in (1.78 m)	Jr	Meridian High School	Meridian, Idaho
G	25	Aaliyah Alexander	5 ft 8 in (1.73 m)	RS So	Todd Beamer High School	Federal Way, Washington
G	30	Gabrielle Jung	5 ft 10 in (1.78 m)	RS Jr	Dickinson High School	Dickinson, North Dakota
SF	41	Addison Hall	5 ft 10 in (1.78 m)	So	Winlock Senior High School	Winlock, Washington
PF	44	Camille Jentzsch	6 ft 3 in (1.91 m)	So	Lake Stevens High School	Lake Stevens, Washington
PF	52	Bella Hays	6 ft 4 in (1.93 m)	RS Fr	Wasilla High School	Wasilla, Alaska

Head coach

- Joddie Gleason (Chico State)

Assistant coach(es)

- Skip Gleason (Chico State)
- Brandon Morrison (UNLV)
- Jordan Loera (Oregon)

Legend

- (C) Team captain
- (S) Suspended
- (I) Ineligible
- (W) Walk-on
- Injured
- Current redshirt

Roster
Last update: January 1, 2024

== Schedule and results ==
Date time, TV	Rank^{#}	Opponent^{#}	Result	Record	High points	High rebounds	High assists	Site (attendance) city, state
Exhibition
October 29, 2023*; 2:00 pm		Montana Tech	W 80–49	–	–	–	–	Reese Court; Cheney, WA
Regular season
November 8, 2023*; 5:30 pm, ESPN+		at Southern Utah	W 86–77	1–0	27 – Alexander	11 – Alexander	4 – 2 Tied	America First Event Center (740); Cedar City, UT
November 10, 2023*; 4:00 pm		at Utah State	W 75–39	2–0	18 – Alexander	5 – 3 Tied	12 – Loera	Smith Spectrum (326); Logan, UT
November 16, 2023*; 6:00 pm, ESPN+		Corban	W 72–47	3–0	13 – 2 Tied	8 – Jung	3 – Loera	Reese Court (586); Cheney, WA
November 20, 2023*; 6:00 pm, ESPN+		at UC Irvine	L 63–71	3–1	17 – 2 Tied	6 – 3 Tied	3 – 2 Tied	Bren Events Center (537); Irvine, CA
November 22, 2023*; 5:00 pm, ESPN+		at Tarleton State	W 64–62	4–1	16 – Pettis	12 – Knowles	3 – 3 Tied	Wisdom Gymnasium (427); Stephenville, TX
November 29, 2023*; 6:00 pm, SWX/ESPN+		Gonzaga	L 80–82	4–2	21 – Lawrence	9 – Knowles	7 – Loera	Reese Court (1,378); Cheney, WA
December 3, 2023*; 2:00 pm, ESPN+		Boise State	W 64–43	5–2	14 – Alexander	6 – 4 Tied	6 – Loera	Reese Court (729); Cheney, WA
December 9, 2023*; 6:00 pm, ESPN+		Walla Walla	W 82–33	6–2	15 – Hays	6 – Knowles	6 – Zylak	Reese Court (429); Cheney, WA
December 15, 2023*; 11:30 am, P12N		at California	L 70–78	6–3	16 – Buckley	4 – 3 Tied	6 – Loera	Haas Pavilion (4,112); Berkeley, CA
December 21, 2023*; 12:00 pm		vs. Presbyterian; Vegas Holiday Hoops	W 92–51	7–3	12 – Alexander	5 – 3 Tied	5 – 2 Tied	South Point Arena; Enterprise, NV
December 22, 2023*; 12:00 pm		vs. Wyoming; Vegas Holiday Hoops	W 62–43	8–3	16 – Loera	8 – Buckley	4 – Loera	South Point Arena; Enterprise, NV
December 28, 2023; 6:00 pm, ESPN+		at Portland State	W 68–58	9–3 (1–0)	21 – Alexander	8 – 2 Tied	9 – Loera	Viking Pavilion (563); Portland, OR
December 30, 2023; 2:00 pm, ESPN+		at Sacramento State	W 60–33	10–3 (2–0)	23 – Alexander	10 – Alexander	5 – Loera	Hornets Nest (329); Sacramento, CA
January 3, 2024*; 6:00 pm, ESPN+		Omaha; Summit League Challenge	W 96–82	11–3	23 – Lawrence	13 – Knowles	7 – Loera	Reese Court (492); Cheney, WA
January 6, 2024*; 11:00 am, SLN		at North Dakota; Summit League Challenge	W 72–65	12–3	18 – Alexander	14 – Alexander	6 – Loera	Betty Engelstad Sioux Center; Grand Forks, ND
January 13, 2024; 1:00 pm, SWX/ESPN+		at Idaho	W 67–44	13–3 (3–0)	27 – Alexander	10 – Loera	6 – Loera	ICCU Arena (1,045); Moscow, ID
January 18, 2024; 11:00 am, ESPN+		Weber State	W 56–38	14–3 (4–0)	17 – Loera	9 – Buckley	5 – Loera	Reese Court (2,231); Cheney, WA
January 20, 2024; 2:00 pm, ESPN+		Idaho State	W 68–46	15–3 (5–0)	19 – Loera	9 – Loera	8 – Loera	Reese Court (672); Cheney, WA
January 25, 2024; 5:00 pm, ESPN+		at Northern Colorado	W 68–62	16–3 (6–0)	17 – Lawrence	8 – Hays	1 – 5 Tied	Bank of Colorado Arena (753); Greeley, CO
January 27, 2024; 1:00 pm, ESPN+		at Northern Arizona	L 81–89 ^{OT}	16–4 (6–1)	31 – Alexander	11 – Loera	6 – Loera	Findlay Toyota Court (452); Flagstaff, AZ
February 1, 2024; 6:00 pm, ESPN+		Montana State	L 61–62	16–5 (6–2)	15 – Loera	8 – Knowles	3 – Loera	Reese Court (539); Cheney, WA
February 3, 2024; 2:00 pm, ESPN+		Montana	W 61–56	17–5 (7–2)	19 – Loera	11 – Loera	3 – 2 Tied	Reese Court (592); Cheney, WA
February 5, 2024; 6:00 pm, ESPN+		Portland State	W 63–39	18–5 (8–2)	14 – 2 Tied	8 – Loera	7 – Loera	Reese Court (491); Cheney, WA
February 10, 2024; 2:00 pm, SWX/ESPN+		Idaho	W 62–52	19–5 (9–2)	15 – Alexander	7 – Lawrence	6 – Loera	Reese Court (964); Cheney, WA
February 15, 2024; 6:00 pm, ESPN+		at Idaho State	W 59–56	20–5 (10–2)	15 – 2 Tied	7 – Loera	3 – Loera	Reed Gym (720); Pocatello, ID
February 17, 2024; 1:00 pm, ESPN+		at Weber State	W 74–54	21–5 (11–2)	21 – Loera	8 – Knowles	8 – Loera	Dee Events Center (331); Ogden, UT
February 22, 2024; 6:00 pm, ESPN+		Northern Arizona	W 67-42	22–5 (12–2)	15 – Loera	10 – Martin	5 – Loera	Reese Court (779); Cheney, WA
February 24, 2024; 2:00 pm, ESPN+		Northern Colorado	W 68–63	23–5 (13–2)	19 – Lawrence	9 – Lawrence	5 – Loera	Reese Court (859); Cheney, WA
February 29, 2024; 6:00 pm, ESPN+		at Montana	W 56–55	24–5 (14–2)	20 – Loera	10 – Loera	2 – 4 Tied	Dahlberg Arena (3,495); Missoula, MT
March 2, 2024; 1:00 pm, ESPN+		at Montana State	W 52-50	25–5 (15–2)	15 – Loera	8 – Buckley	8 – Loera	Worthington Arena (2,007); Bozeman, MT
March 4, 2024; 6:00 pm, ESPN+		Sacramento State	W 72–59	26–5 (16–2)	14 – 3 Tied	7 – 2 Tied	8 – Loera	Reese Court (823); Cheney, WA
Big Sky tournament
March 10, 2024; 11:00 am, ESPN+	(1)	vs. (9) Weber State; Quarterfinals	W 71–58	27–5	15 – Lawrence	9 – Buckley	8 – Loera	Idaho Central Arena; Boise, ID
March 12, 2024; 11:00 am, ESPN+	(1)	vs. (4) Montana State; Semifinals	W 56–39	28–5	16 – Buckley	10 – Alexander	8 – Loera	Idaho Central Arena; Boise, ID
March 13, 2024; 2:00 pm, ESPNU	(1)	vs. (2) Northern Arizona; Championship Game	W 73–64	29–5	20 – Buckley	11 – Buckley	5 – Loera	Idaho Central Arena; Boise, ID
NCAA Women's Tournament
March 22, 2024*; 5:00 p.m., ESPNU	(14 A1)	at (3 A1) No. 12 Oregon State; First round	L 51–73	29–6	21 – Loera	5 – Buckley	4 – Loera	Gill Coliseum; Corvallis, OR
*Non-conference game. ^{#}Rankings from AP Poll. (#) Tournament seedings in parentheses. A1=Albany 1. All times are in Pacific.
