= 2023–24 Portland State Vikings women's basketball team =

American college basketball season

2023–24 Portland State Vikings women's basketball
- Conference: Big Sky Conference
- Record: 8–23 (3–15 Big Sky)
- Head coach: Chelsey Gregg (3rd season)
- Associate head coach: Keithan Gregg
- Assistant coaches: Ashley Bolston; Megan Kritscher
- Home arena: Viking Pavilion

2023–24 Big Sky women's basketball standings
	Conf.				Overall
Team	W		L	PCT	W		L	PCT
Eastern Washington †	16	–	2	.889	29	–	6	.829
Northern Arizona	15	–	3	.833	25	–	9	.735
Montana	13	–	5	.722	23	–	10	.697
Montana State	10	–	8	.556	17	–	16	.515
Northern Colorado	10	–	8	.556	15	–	16	.484
Idaho	8	–	10	.444	15	–	16	.484
Idaho State	7	–	11	.389	11	–	19	.367
Sacramento State	4	–	14	.222	6	–	25	.194
Weber State	4	–	14	.222	8	–	25	.242
Portland State	3	–	15	.167	8	–	23	.258
† 2024 Big Sky tournament winner

The 2023–24 Portland State Vikings women's basketball team represented Portland State University during the 2023–24 NCAA Division I women's basketball season. The Vikings, led by third-year head coach Chelsey Gregg, played their home games at the Viking Pavilion in Portland, Oregon as a member of the Big Sky Conference.

== Previous season ==
The Vikings finished the 2022–23 season 15–16, 8–10 in Big Sky play, to finish in seventh place. As the #7 seed in the Big Sky tournament, they defeated #8 seed Idaho State in the first round, upset #2 seed Montana State in the quarterfinals, before falling to #3 seed and eventual tournament champions Sacramento State in the semifinals.

== Roster ==
2023–24 Portland State Vikings women's basketball team
Players
Coaches

Pos.	#	Name	Height	Year	Previous school	Hometown
G/F	0	Sofía Llanos	6 ft 0 in (1.83 m)	Jr	Marshall	Tarragona, Spain
G/F	1	Alaya Fitzgerald	5 ft 11 in (1.8 m)	Jr	Mesquite High School	Gilbert, AZ
G	2	Mia 'Uhila	5 ft 8 in (1.73 m)	Jr	Bartlett High School	Anchorage, AK
G	3	Brooklyn Strandy	6 ft 0 in (1.83 m)	So	West Albany High School	Albany, OR
G	4	Ella Kaleta	5 ft 10 in (1.78 m)	Fr	Bothell High School	Bothell, WA
F	5	Cinco McCartney	5 ft 11 in (1.8 m)	Sr	Northeastern	The Bronx, NY
F	8	Joy Haltom	5 ft 11 in (1.8 m)	Fr	Juanita High School	Kirkland, WA
G	11	Laynee Torres-Kahapea	5 ft 6 in (1.68 m)	Fr	Punahou School	Kaneohe, HI
G	12	Esmeralda Morales	5 ft 5 in (1.65 m)	Jr	Bethel High School	Spanaway, WA
G	13	Alani Encinas	5 ft 7 in (1.7 m)	So	Buena High School	Sierra Vista, AZ
F	15	Lana Wenger	6 ft 4 in (1.93 m)	Jr	Texas Tech	Hersberg, Switzerland
F	20	Paige Winter	6 ft 0 in (1.83 m)	Sr	Centralia College	Rochester, WA
G	22	Rhema Ogele	6 ft 3 in (1.91 m)	Jr	St. Ignatius College Prep	Chicago, IL
F	23	Chimera Iloanya	6 ft 0 in (1.83 m)	RS So	Trinity Valley Community College	Tampa, FL
G/F	30	Alma Rashelbach	6 ft 0 in (1.83 m)	Fr	Hof Hasharon	Tel Aviv, Israel

Head coach

- Chelsey Gregg (Southern Oregon)

Assistant coach(es)

- Keithan Gregg (Great Falls)
- Ashley Bolston (Portland State)
- Megan Kritscher (Sacramento State)

Legend

- (C) Team captain
- (S) Suspended
- (I) Ineligible
- (W) Walk-on
- Injured
- Current redshirt

Roster
Last update: January 4, 2024

== Schedule and results ==
Date time, TV	Rank^{#}	Opponent^{#}	Result	Record	High points	High rebounds	High assists	Site (attendance) city, state
Regular season
November 9, 2023*; 5:00 p.m., ESPN+		at UC Davis	W 71–62	1–0	24 – Ogele	11 – Ogele	5 – 2 tied	University Credit Union Center (432); Davis, CA
November 11, 2023*; 2:00 p.m., ESPN+		at San Diego	L 43–71	1–1	17 – Morales	5 – 2 tied	2 – 3 tied	Jenny Craig Pavilion (327); San Diego, CA
November 14, 2023*; 6:00 p.m., ESPN+		Warner Pacific	W 74–62	2–1	23 – Morales	8 – Wenger	5 – 2 tied	Viking Pavilion (398); Portland, OR
November 18, 2023*; 1:00 p.m., ESPN+		at New Mexico State	L 38–57	2–2	19 – Morales	8 – McCartney	2 – Wenger	Pan American Center (100); Las Cruces, NM
November 25, 2023*; 2:00 p.m., ESPN+		Seattle	W 75–68	3–2	27 – Morales	9 – Haltom	4 – 2 tied	Viking Pavilion (379); Portland, OR
November 29, 2023*; 6:00 p.m., MWN		at Fresno State	W 72–61	4–2	21 – Morales	10 – Ogele	4 – 'Uhila	Save Mart Center (320); Fresno, CA
December 9, 2023*; 2:00 p.m., P12N		at Oregon	L 54–65	4–3	20 – 'Uhila	5 – 2 tied	3 – 2 tied	Matthew Knight Arena (5,324); Eugene, OR
December 12, 2023*; 6:00 p.m., ESPN+		Bushnell	W 69–60	5–3	26 – Morales	8 – Ogele	5 – 'Uhila	Viking Pavilion (287); Portland, OR
December 16, 2023*; 2:00 p.m., ESPN+		San Francisco	L 63–74	5–4	21 – Morales	5 – 2 tied	4 – 'Uhila	Viking Pavilion (367); Portland, OR
December 20, 2023*; 2:00 p.m., ESPN+		Portland	L 54–67	5–5	18 – Morales	11 – McCartney	5 – 'Uhila	Viking Pavilion (449); Portland, OR
December 28, 2023; 6:00 p.m., ESPN+		Eastern Washington	L 58–68	5–6 (0–1)	14 – Ogele	14 – Ogele	3 – 'Uhila	Viking Pavilion (563); Portland, OR
December 30, 2023; 2:00 p.m., ESPN+		Idaho	L 55–61	5–7 (0–2)	18 – Morales	7 – Wenger	3 – Morales	Viking Pavilion (368); Portland, OR
January 3, 2024*; 5:00 p.m., MidcoSN+		at Kansas City; Big Sky–Summit Challenge	L 56–75	5–8	14 – 2 tied	5 – Ogele	3 – 2 tied	Swinney Recreation Center (374); Kansas City, MO
January 6, 2024*; 2:00 p.m., ESPN+		St. Thomas; Big Sky–Summit Challenge	L 44–62	5–9	15 – Morales	9 – Ogele	3 – 2 tied	Viking Pavilion (371); Portland, OR
January 11, 2024; 6:00 p.m., ESPN+		at Idaho State	L 43–79	5–10 (0–3)	21 – Morales	5 – 'Uhila	2 – Haltom	Reed Gym (742); Pocatello, ID
January 13, 2024; 1:00 p.m., ESPN+		at Weber State	L 53–89	5–11 (0–4)	18 – Morales	6 – 'Uhila	4 – Morales	Dee Events Center (359); Ogden, UT
January 18, 2024; 6:00 p.m., ESPN+		Northern Arizona	L 65–73	5–12 (0–5)	19 – 'Uhila	10 – 'Uhila	6 – Morales	Viking Pavilion (55); Portland, OR
January 20, 2024; 2:00 p.m., ESPN+		Northern Colorado	L 54–71	5–13 (0–6)	14 – Fitzgerald	6 – Wenger	5 – 'Uhila	Viking Pavilion (359); Portland, OR
January 25, 2024; 6:00 p.m., ESPN+		at Montana	L 46–87	5–14 (0–7)	10 – Llanos	5 – Fitzgerald	2 – 2 tied	Dahlberg Arena (2,278); Missoula, MT
January 27, 2024; 1:00 p.m., ESPN+		at Montana State	L 50–71	5–15 (0–8)	19 – Morales	6 – Ogele	4 – Morales	Worthington Arena (2,361); Bozeman, MT
February 3, 2024; 2:00 p.m., ESPN+		at Sacramento State	L 65–72	5–16 (0–9)	22 – Morales	12 – Ogele	5 – Morales	Hornets Nest (421); Sacramento, CA
February 5, 2024; 6:00 p.m., ESPN+		at Eastern Washington	L 39–63	5–17 (0–10)	14 – Morales	8 – Ogele	2 – 'Uhila	Reese Court (491); Cheney, WA
February 8, 2024; 6:00 p.m., ESPN+		Weber State	L 46–67	5–18 (0–11)	12 – Morales	6 – 2 tied	4 – Morales	Viking Pavilion (421); Portland, OR
February 10, 2024; 2:00 p.m., ESPN+		Idaho State	W 59–53	6–18 (1–11)	19 – Fitzgerald	8 – 'Uhila	6 – Morales	Viking Pavilion (349); Portland, OR
February 15, 2024; 5:00 p.m., ESPN+		at Northern Colorado	L 48–65	6–19 (1–12)	12 – Wenger	8 – Ogele	5 – Morales	Bank of Colorado Arena (651); Greeley, CO
February 17, 2024; 1:00 p.m., ESPN+		at Northern Arizona	L 73–89	6–20 (1–13)	22 – Morales	6 – Fitzgerald	4 – 2 tied	Findlay Toyota Court (492); Flagstaff, AZ
February 22, 2024; 6:00 p.m., ESPN+		Montana State	W 60–55	7–20 (2–13)	20 – Morales	6 – Ogele	5 – 'Uhila	Viking Pavilion (338); Portland, OR
February 24, 2024; 2:00 p.m., ESPN+		Montana	L 65–76	7–21 (2–14)	31 – Morales	8 – 'Uhila	4 – 'Uhila	Viking Pavilion (439); Portland, OR
March 2, 2024; 2:00 p.m., ESPN+		Sacramento State	W 57–51	8–21 (3–14)	25 – Morales	13 – Ogele	4 – 'Uhila	Viking Pavilion (526); Portland, OR
March 4, 2024; 6:00 p.m., ESPN+		at Idaho	L 44–60	8–22 (3–15)	14 – Fitzgerald	7 – Ogele	1 – 3 tied	ICCU Arena (1,218); Moscow, ID
Big Sky tournament
March 9, 2024; 11:00 a.m., ESPN+	(10)	vs. (9) Weber State	L 53–62	8–23	27 – Ogele	6 – 'Uhila	2 – Morales	Idaho Central Arena; Boise, ID
*Non-conference game. ^{#}Rankings from AP poll. (#) Tournament seedings in parentheses. All times are in Pacific.
