= 2023–24 Northern Arizona Lumberjacks women's basketball team =

American college basketball season

2023–24 Northern Arizona Lumberjacks women's basketball

WNIT, second round
- Conference: Big Sky Conference
- Record: 25–10 (15–3 Big Sky)
- Head coach: Loree Payne (7th season)
- Assistant coaches: Kellee Barney; TJ Harris; Ryan Freeman
- Home arena: Rolle Activity Center; Findlay Toyota Court

2023–24 Big Sky women's basketball standings
	Conf.				Overall
Team	W		L	PCT	W		L	PCT
Eastern Washington †	16	–	2	.889	29	–	6	.829
Northern Arizona	15	–	3	.833	25	–	9	.735
Montana	13	–	5	.722	23	–	10	.697
Montana State	10	–	8	.556	17	–	16	.515
Northern Colorado	10	–	8	.556	15	–	16	.484
Idaho	8	–	10	.444	15	–	16	.484
Idaho State	7	–	11	.389	11	–	19	.367
Sacramento State	4	–	14	.222	6	–	25	.194
Weber State	4	–	14	.222	8	–	25	.242
Portland State	3	–	15	.167	8	–	23	.258
† 2024 Big Sky tournament winner

The 2023–24 Northern Arizona Lumberjacks women's basketball team represented Northern Arizona University during the 2023–24 NCAA Division I women's basketball season. The Lumberjacks, led by seventh-year head coach Loree Payne, split their home games between Rolle Activity Center and Findlay Toyota Court in Flagstaff, Arizona as members of the Big Sky Conference.

The Lumberjacks finished the season 25–10, 15–3 in Big Sky play, to finish in second place. They defeated Sacramento State and Montana, before falling to top-seeded Eastern Washington in the Big Sky tournament championship game. They received an automatic bid into the WNIT, where they would fall to South Dakota in the second round.

== Previous season ==
The Lumberjacks finished the 2022–23 season 25–7, 13–5 in Big Sky play, to finish in a three-way tie for first place. Due to tiebreakers, they received the #1 seed in the Big Sky tournament, where they would defeat #9 seed Northern Colorado in the quarterfinals, and Eastern Washington in the semifinals, before falling to Sacramento State in the championship game. They received an automatic bid into the WNIT, where they lost to New Mexico in the first round.

== Roster ==
2023–24 Northern Arizona Lumberjacks women's basketball team
Players
Coaches

Pos.	#	Name	Height	Year	Previous school	Hometown
F	1	Allie Cummins	5 ft 9 in (1.75 m)	Fr	Carondelet High School	Concord, CA
G/F	2	Nyah Moran	5 ft 11 in (1.8 m)	Jr	King High School	Riverside, CA
G	3	Grace Beasley	5 ft 7 in (1.7 m)	Sr	Montana State	Melbourne, Australia
G	5	Taylor Feldman	5 ft 8 in (1.73 m)	So	Crean Lutheran High School	Tustin, CA
F	10	Ceren Oturakci	6 ft 1 in (1.85 m)	Fr	Çankaya	Ankara, Turkey
G	11	Audrey Taylor	5 ft 6 in (1.68 m)	So	Timberline High School	Boise, ID
F	12	Sophie Glancey	6 ft 2 in (1.88 m)	So	Timberline High School	Boise, ID
F	13	Ava Schmidt	6 ft 2 in (1.88 m)	Fr	Eastlake High School	Sammamish, WA
G	15	Leia Beattie	5 ft 9 in (1.75 m)	Jr	Montana State	Midland, TX
G/F	21	Emily Rodabaugh	6 ft 0 in (1.83 m)	Sr	Archbishop Murphy High School	Lynnwood, WA
G/F	22	Olivia Moran	5 ft 11 in (1.8 m)	Jr	King High School	Riverside, CA
G	24	Reilly Clark	5 ft 10 in (1.78 m)	Fr	Catalina Foothills High School	Tucson, AZ
F	33	Saniyah Neverson	6 ft 1 in (1.85 m)	So	PHH Prep	Surprise, AZ

Head coach

- Loree Payne (Washington)

Assistant coach(es)

- Kellee Barney (Idaho)
- TJ Harris (Great Falls)
- Ryan Freeman (Florida)

Legend

- (C) Team captain
- (S) Suspended
- (I) Ineligible
- (W) Walk-on
- Injured
- Current redshirt

Roster
Last update: January 3, 2024

== Schedule and results ==
Date time, TV	Rank^{#}	Opponent^{#}	Result	Record	High points	High rebounds	High assists	Site (attendance) city, state
Regular season
November 6, 2023*; 7:00 p.m., P12N		at Oregon	L 48–81	0–1	9 – Glancey	7 – Beasley	4 – 2 tied	Matthew Knight Arena (5,430); Eugene, OR
November 10, 2023*; 6:30 p.m., P12N		at Arizona	L 64–87	0–2	11 – 2 tied	5 – Beasley	5 – Feldman	McKale Center (6,909); Tucson, AZ
November 15, 2023*; 6:00 p.m., ESPN+		Benedictine Mesa	W 91–37	2–1	13 – 2 tied	11 – Neverson	4 – 2 tied	Rolle Activity Center (417); Flagstaff, AZ
November 19, 2023*; 3:00 p.m., ESPN+		at UC San Diego	W 74–69	2–2	20 – Beattie	7 – 2 tied	4 – N. Moran	LionTree Arena (934); La Jolla, CA
November 24, 2023*; 1:00 p.m.		vs. Portland; Las Vegas Holiday Classic	W 66–65	3–2	11 – 2 tied	13 – Beattie	7 – Beattie	Orleans Arena; Paradise, NV
November 25, 2023*; 3:30 p.m.		vs. Youngstown State; Las Vegas Holiday Classic	W 74–70	4–2	26 – Glancey	7 – Glancey	5 – Feldman	Orleans Arena; Paradise, NV
November 29, 2023*; 6:00 p.m., ESPN+		UNLV	L 69–85	4–3	13 – 2 tied	10 – Neverson	5 – Beattie	Rolle Activity Center (400); Flagstaff, AZ
December 6, 2023*; 12:00 p.m., ESPN+		Pacific	W 96–65	5–3	18 – Glancey	9 – Rodabaugh	7 – Rodabaugh	Rolle Activity Center (913); Flagstaff, AZ
December 9, 2023*; 3:00 p.m., ESPN+		at San Francisco	W 92–76	6–3	17 – Rodabaugh	11 – Glancey	6 – Feldman	War Memorial Gymnasium (225); San Francisco, CA
December 18, 2023*; 3:00 p.m., ESPN+		at Pepperdine	W 80–62	7–3	21 – Beasley	13 – Glancey	5 – Beasley	Firestone Fieldhouse (160); Malibu, CA
December 21, 2023*; 2:00 p.m., ESPN+		at Southern Utah	W 81–70	8–3	19 – Rodabaugh	9 – Rodabaugh	4 – Beasley	America First Event Center (452); Cedar City, UT
December 30, 2023; 2:00 p.m., ESPN+		Northern Colorado	W 76–72	9–3 (1–0)	19 – Glancey	7 – Rodabaugh	4 – Beasley	Findlay Toyota Court (764); Flagstaff, AZ
January 3, 2024*; 6:00 p.m., ESPN+		South Dakota State; Big Sky–Summit Challenge	L 102–110 ^{2OT}	9–4	23 – Beasley	9 – Beasley	5 – 2 tied	Findlay Toyota Court (287); Flagstaff, AZ
January 6, 2024*; 12:00 p.m., SLN		at North Dakota State; Big Sky–Summit Challenge	L 73–99	9–5	12 – Beattie	4 – Feldman	4 – Rodabaugh	Scheels Center (751); Fargo, ND
January 11, 2024; 6:00 p.m., ESPN+		Montana State	W 88–73	10–5 (2–0)	23 – Rodabaugh	10 – Glancey	6 – Beasley	Findlay Toyota Court (207); Flagstaff, AZ
January 13, 2024; 2:00 p.m., ESPN+		Montana	L 84–89	10–6 (2–1)	22 – Beattie	5 – 3 tied	6 – Moran	Findlay Toyota Court (392); Flagstaff, AZ
January 18, 2024; 7:00 p.m., ESPN+		at Portland State	W 73–65	11–6 (3–1)	27 – Beattie	9 – Rodabaugh	4 – Beattie	Viking Pavilion (55); Portland, OR
January 20, 2024; 3:00 p.m., ESPN+		at Sacramento State	W 83–66	12–6 (4–1)	24 – Glancey	13 – Glancey	5 – Moran	Hornets Nest (334); Sacramento, CA
January 25, 2024; 6:00 p.m., ESPN+		Idaho	W 65–53	13–6 (5–1)	23 – Glancey	9 – Glancey	5 – Beattie	Findlay Toyota Court (667); Flagstaff, AZ
January 27, 2024; 2:00 p.m., ESPN+		Eastern Washington	W 89–81 ^{OT}	14–6 (6–1)	23 – Glancey	12 – Neverson	6 – Moran	Findlay Toyota Court (452); Flagstaff, AZ
February 1, 2024; 6:00 p.m., ESPN+		at Weber State	W 85–65	15–6 (7–1)	18 – Rodabaugh	9 – Glancey	8 – Feldman	Dee Events Center (255); Ogden, UT
February 3, 2024; 2:00 p.m., ESPN+		at Idaho State	W 73–59	16–6 (8–1)	21 – Feldman	7 – 2 tied	2 – 4 tied	Reed Gym (1,017); Pocatello, ID
February 8, 2024; 7:00 p.m., ESPN+		at Montana	W 69–60	17–6 (9–1)	30 – Glancey	10 – Beattie	5 – Moran	Dahlberg Arena (2,157); Missoula, MT
February 10, 2024; 2:00 p.m., ESPN+		at Montana State	W 71–58	18–6 (10–1)	30 – Glancey	11 – 2 tied	7 – Feldman	Worthington Arena (2,141); Bozeman, MT
February 15, 2024; 6:00 p.m., ESPN+		Sacramento State	L 66–82	18–7 (10–2)	18 – Beattie	7 – Moran	4 – 2 tied	Findlay Toyota Court (342); Flagstaff, AZ
February 17, 2024; 2:00 p.m., ESPN+		Portland State	W 89–73	19–7 (11–2)	21 – Glancey	9 – Glancey	9 – Feldman	Findlay Toyota Court (492); Flagstaff, AZ
February 22, 2024; 7:00 p.m., ESPN+		at Eastern Washington	L 42–67	19–8 (11–3)	13 – Moran	7 – Glancey	2 – 2 tied	Reese Court (779); Cheney, WA
February 24, 2024; 3:00 p.m., ESPN+		at Idaho	W 60–55	20–8 (12–3)	14 – Moran	8 – Glancey	3 – Beasley	ICCU Arena (1,150); Moscow, ID
February 29, 2024; 6:00 p.m., ESPN+		Idaho State	W 89–74	21–8 (13–3)	21 – Rodabaugh	6 – Rodabaugh	7 – Moran	Findlay Toyota Court (423); Flagstaff, AZ
March 2, 2024; 2:00 p.m., ESPN+		Weber State	W 73–41	22–8 (14–3)	24 – Glancey	8 – 2 tied	7 – Beattie	Findlay Toyota Court (662); Flagstaff, AZ
March 4, 2024; 6:00 p.m., ESPN+		at Northern Colorado	W 67–61	23–8 (15–3)	22 – Glancey	12 – Glancey	4 – Rodabaugh	Bank of Colorado Arena (772); Greeley, CO
Big Sky tournament
March 10, 2024; 2:30 p.m., ESPN+	(2)	vs. (8) Sacramento State; Quarterfinals	W 81–63	24–8	30 – Glancey	11 – Glancey	4 – Rodabaugh	Idaho Central Arena; Boise, ID
March 12, 2024; 2:30 p.m., ESPN+	(2)	vs. (3) Montana; Semifinals	W 74–67	25–8	21 – Glancey	11 – Glancey	3 – 2 tied	Idaho Central Arena; Boise, ID
March 13, 2024; 3:00 p.m., ESPNU	(2)	vs. (1) Eastern Washington; Championship game	L 64–73	25–9	15 – Glancey	9 – Moran	3 – Beattie	Idaho Central Arena; Boise, ID
WNIT
March 26, 2024*; 5:00 p.m., SLN		at South Dakota; Second round	L 65–79	25–10	19 – Beattie	7 – 3 tied	4 – Beasley	Sanford Coyote Sports Center (1,465); Vermillion, SD
*Non-conference game. ^{#}Rankings from AP poll. (#) Tournament seedings in parentheses. All times are in Mountain.
