= 2023–24 Northern Colorado Bears women's basketball team =

American college basketball season

2023–24 Northern Colorado Bears women's basketball
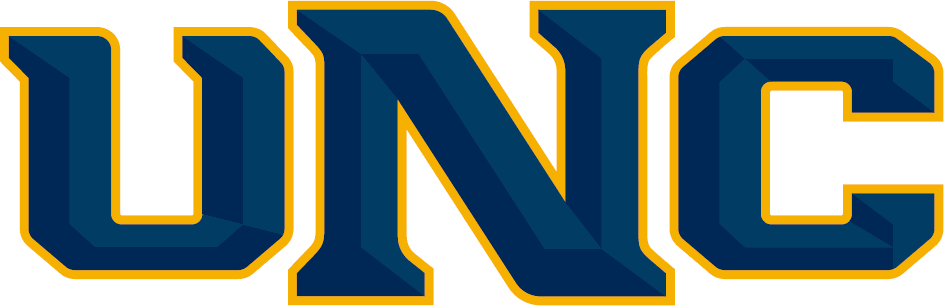

WNIT, first round
- Conference: Big Sky Conference
- Record: 15–16 (10–8 Big Sky)
- Head coach: Kristen Mattio (3rd season)
- Associate head coach: Camille Perkins
- Assistant coaches: Desiree Jackson; Jerad Stottlemyre
- Home arena: Bank of Colorado Arena

2023–24 Big Sky women's basketball standings
	Conf.				Overall
Team	W		L	PCT	W		L	PCT
Eastern Washington †	16	–	2	.889	29	–	6	.829
Northern Arizona	15	–	3	.833	25	–	9	.735
Montana	13	–	5	.722	23	–	10	.697
Montana State	10	–	8	.556	17	–	16	.515
Northern Colorado	10	–	8	.556	15	–	16	.484
Idaho	8	–	10	.444	15	–	16	.484
Idaho State	7	–	11	.389	11	–	19	.367
Sacramento State	4	–	14	.222	6	–	25	.194
Weber State	4	–	14	.222	8	–	25	.242
Portland State	3	–	15	.167	8	–	23	.258
† 2024 Big Sky tournament winner

The 2023–24 Northern Colorado Bears women's basketball team represented the University of Northern Colorado during the 2023–24 NCAA Division I women's basketball season. The Bears, led by third-year head coach Kristen Mattio, played their home games at the Bank of Colorado Arena in Greeley, Colorado as members of the Big Sky Conference. The finished the season 15–16, 10–8 in Big Sky play, to tie for fourth place.

== Previous season ==
The Bears finished the 2022–23 season 13–18, 5–13 in Big Sky play, to finish in ninth place. As the #9 seed in the Big Sky tournament, they defeated #10 seed Weber State in the first round before falling to top-seeded Northern Arizona in the quarterfinals.

== Roster ==
2023–24 Northern Colorado Bears women's basketball team
Players
Coaches

Pos.	#	Name	Height	Year	Previous school	Hometown
G	3	Seneca Hackley	5 ft 9 in (1.75 m)	RS Jr	Florida Gulf Coast	Colorado Springs, CO
G	4	Paisley Specht	5 ft 11 in (1.8 m)	RS So	Idaho State	Folsom, CA
G	5	Michelle Duchemin	6 ft 0 in (1.83 m)	Jr	Cal State Northridge	Encino, CA
G	10	Hannah Simental	5 ft 8 in (1.73 m)	Sr	Pueblo West High School	Pueblo, CO
G	11	Lilah Moore	5 ft 10 in (1.78 m)	So	Pinnacle High School	Phoenix, AZ
F	12	Delaynie Byrne	6 ft 3 in (1.91 m)	Sr	UNLV	Arvada, CO
G	15	Gabi Fields	5 ft 5 in (1.65 m)	So	Brownfield High School	Brownfield, TX
F	22	Aniah Hall	6 ft 3 in (1.91 m)	So	Belton High School	Temple, TX
G	23	Ashley Panem	5 ft 9 in (1.75 m)	GS	Radford	Broomfield, CO
F	24	Tatum West	6 ft 1 in (1.85 m)	Fr	Crandall High School	Combine, TX
G	25	Tiani Abrams	6 ft 1 in (1.85 m)	So	UCF	Vista, CA
F	30	Avery Bang	6 ft 0 in (1.83 m)	So	Chaparral High School	Parker, CO
F	42	Tena Ikidi	6 ft 3 in (1.91 m)	Jr	Pasadena City College	Bayelsa, Nigeria

Head coach

- Kristen Mattio (Evangel)

Assistant coach(es)

- Camille Perkins (Angelo State)
- Desiree Jackson (Southern Utah)
- Jerad Stottlemyre (Washington)

Legend

- (C) Team captain
- (S) Suspended
- (I) Ineligible
- (W) Walk-on
- Injured
- Current redshirt

Roster
Last update: January 4, 2024

== Schedule and results ==
Date time, TV	Rank^{#}	Opponent^{#}	Result	Record	High points	High rebounds	High assists	Site (attendance) city, state
Exhibition
November 1, 2023*; 6:00 p.m.		Colorado Christian	W 76–45		–	–	–	Bank of Colorado Arena; Greeley, CO
Regular season
November 6, 2023*; 5:30 p.m., ESPN+		Hastings	W 86–56	1–0	22 – Byrne	12 – Hall	6 – Fields	Bank of Colorado Arena (683); Greeley, CO
November 14, 2023*; 6:00 p.m., MidcoSN2/SLN		at South Dakota	L 59–72	1–1	15 – Byrne	12 – Byrne	2 – Fields	Sanford Coyote Sports Center (1,539); Vermillion, SD
November 17, 2023*; 11:00 a.m., SLN		at Omaha	W 82–70	2–1	22 – Hackley	10 – Duchemin	7 – Hackley	Baxter Arena (5,539); Omaha, NE
November 20, 2023*; 6:00 p.m., ESPN+		North Dakota State	L 60–67	2–2	24 – Byrne	10 – Byrne	4 – Fields	Bank of Colorado Arena (587); Greeley, CO
November 26, 2023*; 2:00 p.m., ESPN+		Boston University	L 52–63	2–3	26 – Simental	5 – 2 tied	3 – Byrne	Bank of Colorado Arena (506); Greeley, CO
December 3, 2023*; 2:00 p.m., ESPN+		Northern New Mexico	W 96–37	3–3	25 – Byrne	12 – Byrne	5 – West	Bank of Colorado Arena (602); Greeley, CO
December 9, 2023*; 1:00 p.m., MWN		at Air Force	L 60–68	3–4	13 – 2 tied	8 – Byrne	3 – Fields	Clune Arena (210); Colorado Springs, CO
December 16, 2023*; 7:00 p.m., MWN		at Utah State	W 75–57	4–4	24 – Simental	7 – Byrne	6 – Fields	Smith Spectrum (238); Logan, UT
December 21, 2023*; 12:00 p.m., P12N		at No. 8 Colorado	L 56–78	4–5	21 – Byrne	9 – Byrne	5 – Fields	CU Events Center (2,654); Boulder, CO
December 30, 2023; 2:00 p.m., ESPN+		at Northern Arizona	L 72–76	4–6 (0–1)	18 – West	11 – Byrne	5 – Fields	Findlay Toyota Court (764); Flagstaff, AZ
January 3, 2024*; 6:00 p.m., MidcoSN+		at Oral Roberts; Big Sky–Summit Challenge	L 80–81	4–7	27 – Simental	12 – Hall	7 – Fields	Mabee Center (1,148); Tulsa, OK
January 6, 2024*; 2:00 p.m., ESPN+		Denver; Big Sky–Summit Challenge	W 59–56	5–7	23 – Simental	14 – Byrne	2 – Panem	Bank of Colorado Arena (693); Greeley, CO
January 11, 2024; 6:00 p.m., ESPN+		Montana	W 67–57	6–7 (1–1)	17 – Simental	7 – Simental	5 – Byrne	Bank of Colorado Arena (587); Greeley, CO
January 13, 2024; 2:00 p.m., ESPN+		Montana State	W 58–53	7–7 (2–1)	23 – Byrne	9 – Byrne	5 – Byrne	Bank of Colorado Arena (732); Greeley, CO
January 18, 2024; 7:30 p.m., ESPN+		at Sacramento State	W 72–59	8–7 (3–1)	20 – Byrne	7 – Hall	5 – 2 tied	Hornets Nest (348); Sacramento, CA
January 20, 2024; 3:00 p.m., ESPN+		at Portland State	W 71–54	9–7 (4–1)	24 – Hall	16 – Hall	6 – Hackley	Viking Pavilion (359); Portland, OR
January 25, 2024; 6:00 p.m., ESPN+		Eastern Washington	L 62–68	9–8 (4–2)	16 – Byrne	7 – 2 tied	6 – Simental	Bank of Colorado Arena (753); Greeley, CO
January 27, 2024; 2:00 p.m., ESPN+		Idaho	L 56–60	9–9 (4–3)	19 – Hall	10 – Byrne	3 – Hackley	Bank of Colorado Arena (608); Greeley, CO
February 1, 2024; 7:00 p.m., ESPN+		at Idaho State	L 56–76	9–10 (4–4)	14 – Hall	6 – Hall	3 – Simental	Reed Gym; Pocatello, ID
February 3, 2024; 12:00 p.m., ESPN+		at Weber State	W 73–63	10–10 (5–4)	19 – Byrne	7 – 3 tied	6 – Simental	Dee Events Center (331); Ogden, UT
February 8, 2024; 7:00 p.m., ESPN+		at Montana State	L 40–61	10–11 (5–5)	10 – Hackley	8 – West	2 – 2 tied	Worthington Arena (1,773); Bozeman, MT
February 10, 2024; 2:00 p.m., ESPN+		at Montana	L 73–82	10–12 (5–6)	20 – West	10 – Byrne	5 – Fields	Dahlberg Arena (2,545); Missoula, MT
February 15, 2024; 6:00 p.m., ESPN+		Portland State	W 65–48	11–12 (6–6)	12 – Wenger	8 – Ogele	5 – Morales	Bank of Colorado Arena (651); Greeley, CO
February 17, 2024; 2:00 p.m., ESPN+		Sacramento State	W 65-59	12–12 (7–6)	20 – Simental	9 – Byrne	5 – West	Bank of Colorado Arena (809); Greeley, CO
February 22, 2024; 6:00 p.m., ESPN+		at Idaho	W 57–38	13–12 (8–6)	15 – Hackley	13 – Byrne	3 – Fields	ICCU Arena (1,069); Moscow, ID
February 24, 2024; 3:00 p.m., ESPN+		at Eastern Washington	L 63–68	13–13 (8–7)	21 – Hall	8 – Hall	2 – Hackley	Reese Court (859); Cheney, WA
February 29, 2024; 6:00 p.m., ESPN+		Weber State	W 72–64	14–13 (9–7)	19 – Byrne	7 – Byrne	4 – 2 tied	Bank of Colorado Arena (635); Greeley, CO
March 2, 2024; 2:00 p.m., ESPN+		Idaho State	W 63–51	15–13 (10–7)	20 – Byrne	15 – Byrne	7 – Hackley	Bank of Colorado Arena (857); Greeley, CO
March 4, 2024; 6:00 p.m., ESPN+		Northern Arizona	L 61–67	15–14 (10–8)	13 – Simental	7 – Byrne	4 – Simental	Bank of Colorado Arena (772); Greeley, CO
Big Sky tournament
March 11, 2024; 12:00 p.m., ESPN+	(5)	vs. (4) Montana State; Quarterfinals	L 44–47 ^{OT}	15–15	16 – Byrne	9 – 2 tied	7 – Fields	Idaho Central Arena; Boise, ID
WNIT
March 21, 2024*; 5:30 p.m.		at UTSA; First round	L 62–80	15–16	18 – Simental	9 – West	6 – Fields	Convocation Center (873); San Antonio, TX
*Non-conference game. ^{#}Rankings from AP poll. (#) Tournament seedings in parentheses. All times are in Mountain.
