= 2023–24 Idaho State Bengals women's basketball team =

American college basketball season

2023–24 Idaho State Bengals women's basketball
- Conference: Big Sky Conference
- Record: 11–19 (7–11 Big Sky)
- Head coach: Seton Sobolewski (16th season)
- Assistant coaches: Maiya Michel; Dora Goles; Olivia Luu
- Home arena: Reed Gym

2023–24 Big Sky women's basketball standings
	Conf.				Overall
Team	W		L	PCT	W		L	PCT
Eastern Washington †	16	–	2	.889	29	–	6	.829
Northern Arizona	15	–	3	.833	25	–	9	.735
Montana	13	–	5	.722	23	–	10	.697
Montana State	10	–	8	.556	17	–	16	.515
Northern Colorado	10	–	8	.556	15	–	16	.484
Idaho	8	–	10	.444	15	–	16	.484
Idaho State	7	–	11	.389	11	–	19	.367
Sacramento State	4	–	14	.222	6	–	25	.194
Weber State	4	–	14	.222	8	–	25	.242
Portland State	3	–	15	.167	8	–	23	.258
† 2024 Big Sky tournament winner

The 2023–24 Idaho State Bengals women's basketball team represented Idaho State University during the 2023–24 NCAA Division I women's basketball season. The Bengals, led by 16th-year head coach Seton Sobolewski, played their home games at Reed Gym in Pocatello, Idaho as members of the Big Sky Conference. The Bengals finished the season 11–19, 7–11 in Big Sky play, to finish in seventh place. They were defeated by Sacramento State in the first round of the Big Sky tournament.

== Previous season ==
The Bengals finished the 2022–23 season 11–19, 6–12 in Big Sky play, to finish in eighth place. As the #8 seed in the Big Sky tournament, they were defeated by #7 seed Portland State in the first round.

== Roster ==
2023–24 Idaho State Bengals women's basketball team
Players
Coaches

Pos.	#	Name	Height	Year	Previous school	Hometown
G	0	Madilynn Rendall	6 ft 0 in (1.83 m)	Fr	Kamiakin High School	Kennewick, WA
G	1	Kacey Spink	5 ft 9 in (1.75 m)	So	Ferris High School	Spokane, WA
G	2	Priscila Varela	6 ft 0 in (1.83 m)	Jr	Pima Community College	Cabinda, Angola
G	3	Cam Collman	5 ft 8 in (1.73 m)	RS So	Portland	La Grande, OR
F	4	Laura Bello	6 ft 3 in (1.91 m)	Jr	Newman	Dublin, Ireland
G	5	Tasia Jordan	5 ft 8 in (1.73 m)	Jr	Kirkwood Community College	Melrose Park, IL
G	10	Alyse Aby	5 ft 11 in (1.8 m)	Fr	Laurel High School	Laurel, MT
G	11	Nika Lokica	5 ft 10 in (1.78 m)	RS Fr	KA Zana Lelas	Split, Croatia
G	13	Maria Dias	5 ft 9 in (1.75 m)	Jr	College of the Sequoias	Lisbon, Portugal
F	14	Piper Carlson	6 ft 1 in (1.85 m)	Fr	St. Michael-Albertville High School	Albertville, MN
G	21	Ioanna Stefanaki	5 ft 9 in (1.75 m)	Fr	P.A.O.K.	Crete, Greece
G	22	Sophia Covello	5 ft 9 in (1.75 m)	RS So	Woodcreek High School	Roseville, CA
F	24	Halle Wright	6 ft 0 in (1.83 m)	So	Prosser High School	Prosser, WA
F	30	Alaina Williams	6 ft 1 in (1.85 m)	Fr	Brooks-DeBartolo Collegiate High School	Apollo Beach, FL

Head coach

- Seton Sobolewski (Northern Arizona)

Assistant coach(es)

- Maiya Michel (Denver)
- Dora Goles (Idaho State)
- Olivia Luu (Jessup)

Legend

- (C) Team captain
- (S) Suspended
- (I) Ineligible
- (W) Walk-on
- Injured
- Current redshirt

Roster
Last update: January 4, 2024

== Schedule and results ==
Date time, TV	Rank^{#}	Opponent^{#}	Result	Record	High points	High rebounds	High assists	Site (attendance) city, state
Exhibition
November 3, 2023*; 7:00 p.m.		Northern New Mexico	W 62–49	–	–	–	–	Reed Gym; Pocatello, ID
Regular season
November 8, 2023*; 7:00 p.m., ESPN+		Park–Gilbert	W 97–58	1–0	16 – Jordan	14 – Spink	6 – Spink	Reed Gym (657); Pocatello, ID
November 12, 2023*; 3:30 p.m., P12N		at No. 24 Washington State	L 47–64	1–1	10 – Jordan	11 – 2 tied	3 – Covello	Beasley Coliseum (924); Pullman, WA
November 15, 2023*; 7:00 p.m., ESPN+		UC Santa Barbara	W 70–64	2–1	16 – 2 tied	11 – Bello	4 – Aby	Reed Gym (823); Pocatello, ID
November 19, 2023*; 6:00 p.m., P12N		at Arizona State	L 40–72	2–2	9 – Aby	9 – Spink	3 – Spink	Desert Financial Arena (1,776); Tempe, AZ
November 24, 2023*; 3:00 p.m.		vs. Washington; Rainbow Wahine Showdown	L 37–57	2–3	15 – Dias	6 – Lokica	2 – 2 tied	Stan Sheriff Center (250); Honolulu, HI
November 25, 2023*; 5:30 p.m., ESPN+		at Hawaii; Rainbow Wahine Showdown	L 46–58	2–4	10 – Covello	8 – Spink	2 – 2 tied	Stan Sheriff Center (1,372); Honolulu, HI
November 26, 2023*; 5:30 p.m.		vs. Air Force; Rainbow Wahine Showdown	W 55–52	3–4	12 – Covello	15 – Bello	5 – Spink	Stan Sheriff Center; Honolulu, HI
December 6, 2023*; 7:00 p.m., ESPN+		Utah Valley	W 54–50	4–4	17 – Bello	13 – Spink	3 – 3 tied	Reed Gym (843); Pocatello, ID
December 16, 2023*; 2:00 p.m., ESPN+		at BYU	L 76–79 ^{OT}	4–5	22 – Jordan	6 – 2 tied	4 – Dias	Marriott Center (1,911); Provo, UT
December 29, 2023; 7:00 p.m., ESPN+		at Montana State	L 56–58	4–6 (0–1)	21 – Dias	8 – Spink	2 – Lokica	Worthington Arena (1,908); Bozeman, MT
December 31, 2023; 2:00 p.m., ESPN+		at Montana	L 55–66	4–7 (0–2)	15 – Dias	6 – Jordan	6 – Spink	Dahlberg Arena (2,392); Missoula, MT
January 3, 2024*; 7:00 p.m., ESPN+		North Dakota; Big Sky/Summit League Challenge	L 72–78	4–8	16 – Jordan	9 – Jordan	2 – 2 tied	Reed Gym (711); Pocatello, ID
January 6, 2024*; 12:00 p.m., SLN		at South Dakota; Big Sky/Summit League Challenge	L 47–73	4–9	14 – Bello	6 – Spink	5 – Spink	Sanford Coyote Sports Center (1,479); Vermillion, SD
January 11, 2024; 7:00 p.m., ESPN+		Portland State	W 79–43	5–9 (1–2)	15 – Spink	7 – Bello	5 – Jordan	Reed Gym (742); Pocatello, ID
January 13, 2024; 2:00 p.m., ESPN+		Sacramento State	W 62–48	6–9 (2–2)	16 – Lokica	7 – 2 tied	5 – 2 tied	Reed Gym (779); Pocatello, ID
January 18, 2024; 7:00 p.m., ESPN+		at Idaho; Battle of the Domes	W 61–56	7–9 (3–2)	12 – 2 tied	7 – 2 tied	5 – Spink	ICCU Arena (1,153); Moscow, ID
January 20, 2024; 3:00 p.m., ESPN+		at Eastern Washington	L 46–68	7–10 (3–3)	20 – Jordan	5 – 2 tied	2 – 2 tied	Reese Court (672); Cheney, WA
January 22, 2024; 7:00 p.m., ESPN+		Montana State	W 62–53	8–10 (4–3)	15 – Spink	10 – Jordan	4 – Covello	Reed Gym; Pocatello, ID
January 27, 2024; 2:00 p.m., ESPN+		Weber State	W 55–47	9–10 (5–3)	13 – Dias	8 – Dias	2 – 3 tied	Reed Gym (993); Pocatello, ID
February 1, 2024; 7:00 p.m., ESPN+		Northern Colorado	W 76–56	10–10 (6–3)	14 – Bello	6 – Carlson	10 – Spink	Reed Gym; Pocatello, ID
February 3, 2024; 2:00 p.m., ESPN+		Northern Arizona	L 59–73	10–11 (6–4)	12 – Lokica	7 – Bello	5 – Covello	Reed Gym (1,017); Pocatello, ID
February 8, 2024; 7:30 p.m., ESPN+		at Sacramento State	L 58–61	10–12 (6–5)	17 – Dias	4 – 2 tied	5 – Dias	Hornets Nest (405); Sacramento, CA
February 10, 2024; 3:00 p.m., ESPN+		at Portland State	L 53–59	10–13 (6–6)	15 – Lokica	8 – Spink	3 – Dias	Viking Pavilion (349); Portland, OR
February 15, 2024; 7:00 p.m., ESPN+		Eastern Washington	L 56–59	10–14 (6–7)	20 – Wright	12 – Bello	4 – Lokica	Reed Gym (720); Pocatello, ID
February 17, 2024; 2:00 p.m., ESPN+		Idaho; Battle of the Domes	L 48–49	10–15 (6–8)	17 – Lokica	8 – 2 tied	1 – 4 tied	Reed Gym (1,037); Pocatello, ID
February 24, 2024; 2:00 p.m., ESPN+		at Weber State	W 72–57	11–15 (7–8)	20 – Wright	13 – Spink	4 – Spink	Dee Events Center (671); Ogden, UT
February 29, 2024; 6:00 p.m., ESPN+		at Northern Arizona	L 74–89	11–16 (7–9)	18 – Lokica	8 – 2 tied	8 – Covello	Findlay Toyota Court (423); Flagstaff, AZ
March 2, 2024; 2:00 p.m., ESPN+		at Northern Colorado	L 51–63	11–17 (7–10)	14 – Dias	11 – Bello	4 – Dias	Bank of Colorado Arena (857); Greeley, CO
March 4, 2024; 7:00 p.m., ESPN+		Montana	L 65–67	11–18 (7–11)	19 – Covello	6 – 2 tied	4 – 2 tied	Reed Gym (947); Pocatello, ID
Big Sky tournament
March 9, 2024; 2:30 p.m., ESPN+	(7)	vs. (8) Sacramento State; First round	L 55–73	11–19	16 – Spink	6 – 3 tied	5 – Spink	Idaho Central Arena; Boise, ID
*Non-conference game. ^{#}Rankings from AP poll. (#) Tournament seedings in parentheses. All times are in Mountain.
