= 2023–24 Weber State Wildcats women's basketball team =

American college basketball season

2023–24 Weber State Wildcats women's basketball
- Conference: Big Sky Conference
- Record: 8–25 (4–14 Big Sky)
- Head coach: Jenteal Jackson (1st season)
- Assistant coaches: Hillary Carlson; Cydney McHenry; Emily Codding
- Home arena: Dee Events Center

2023–24 Big Sky women's basketball standings
	Conf.				Overall
Team	W		L	PCT	W		L	PCT
Eastern Washington †	16	–	2	.889	29	–	6	.829
Northern Arizona	15	–	3	.833	25	–	9	.735
Montana	13	–	5	.722	23	–	10	.697
Montana State	10	–	8	.556	17	–	16	.515
Northern Colorado	10	–	8	.556	15	–	16	.484
Idaho	8	–	10	.444	15	–	16	.484
Idaho State	7	–	11	.389	11	–	19	.367
Sacramento State	4	–	14	.222	6	–	25	.194
Weber State	4	–	14	.222	8	–	25	.242
Portland State	3	–	15	.167	8	–	23	.258
† 2024 Big Sky tournament winner

The 2023–24 Weber State Wildcats women's basketball team represented Weber State University during the 2023–24 NCAA Division I women's basketball season. The Wildcats, led by first-year head coach Jenteal Jackson, played their home games at the Dee Events Center in Ogden, Utah as a member of the Big Sky Conference. They finished the season 8–25, 4–14 in Big Sky play, to finish in a tie for 8th place.

== Previous season ==
The Wildcats finished the 2022–23 season 6–25, 2–16 in Big Sky play, to finish in 10th (last) place. As the #10 seed in the Big Sky tournament, they were defeated by #9 seed Northern Colorado in the first round.

On March 10, 2023, the school announced that head coach Velaida Harris would be stepping down, ending her five-year tenure. On April 12, Westminster head coach Jenteal Jackson was named the team's next head coach.

== Roster ==
2023–24 Weber State Wildcats women's basketball team
Players
Coaches

Pos.	#	Name	Height	Year	Previous school	Hometown
G/F	0	Laura Taylor	6 ft 0 in (1.83 m)	Sr	Northwest Florida State College	Ballarat, Australia
G	1	Charlotte Hegvold	5 ft 8 in (1.73 m)	Jr	St Peter Claver College	Ipswich, Australia
G	2	Aaliyah Ellis	5 ft 9 in (1.75 m)	Jr	Steele High School	Cibolo, TX
G	3	Kendra Parra	5 ft 9 in (1.75 m)	Jr	MSU Denver	Del Norte, CO
F	4	Ashton Adamson	5 ft 10 in (1.78 m)	Jr	Salt Lake Community College	Pocatello, ID
F	5	Jadyn Matthews	6 ft 0 in (1.83 m)	Sr	Enterprise High School	Redding, CA
G	10	Emri Lovell	5 ft 4 in (1.63 m)	Jr	Harker Heights High School	Killeen, TX
G	11	Kennedy Eskelson	5 ft 8 in (1.73 m)	Jr	College of Southern Idaho	Smithfield, UT
F	13	Amelia Raidaveta	6 ft 2 in (1.88 m)	So	St Francis Xavier's College	Dubbo, Australia
G	15	Kaiija Lesane	5 ft 4 in (1.63 m)	Jr	Antelope High School	Antelope, CA
F	20	Vicky Parra	6 ft 2 in (1.88 m)	Sr	ES Conselleria	Valencia, Spain
F	21	Daryn Hickok	5 ft 10 in (1.78 m)	Sr	Grant High School	Portland, OR
G	22	Amanda Edwards	5 ft 8 in (1.73 m)	Fr	San Juan Hills High School	Ladera Ranch, CA
F	25	Taylor Smith	6 ft 1 in (1.85 m)	Fr	Century High School	Pocatello, ID
G	33	Margarita Satini	5 ft 8 in (1.73 m)	Sr	Westminster	Salt Lake City, UT
F	34	Sierra Davis	6 ft 2 in (1.88 m)	Sr	Charleston	Provo, UT

Head coach

- Jenteal Jackson (Westminster)

Assistant coach(es)

- Hillary Carlson (Wyoming)
- Cydney McHenry (Adams State)
- Emily Codding (Oregon State)

Legend

- (C) Team captain
- (S) Suspended
- (I) Ineligible
- (W) Walk-on
- Injured
- Current redshirt

Roster
Last update: January 5, 2024

== Schedule and results ==
Date time, TV	Rank^{#}	Opponent^{#}	Result	Record	High points	High rebounds	High assists	Site (attendance) city, state
Exhibition
October 31, 2023*; 3:00 p.m.		Fort Lewis	W 77–62	–	19 – Matthews	12 – Lesane	5 – Matthews	Dee Events Center; Ogden, UT
Regular season
November 6, 2023*; 7:30 p.m., ESPN+		at Utah Valley	L 55–56	0–1	13 – K. Parra	9 – Hickok	4 – Lesane	UCCU Center (2,548); Orem, UT
November 10, 2023*; 11:00 a.m., ESPN+		at BYU	L 49–77	0–2	11 – 2 tied	3 – 2 tied	3 – 2 tied	Marriott Center (5,705); Provo, UT
November 13, 2023*; 6:30 p.m., MWN		at Boise State	L 47–76	0–3	12 – Raidaveta	6 – 2 tied	4 – Taylor	ExtraMile Arena (765); Boise, ID
November 17, 2023*; 6:00 p.m., MWN		at Utah State	L 62–72	0–4	22 – K. Parra	7 – Taylor	3 – Matthews	Smith Spectrum (448); Logan, UT
November 24, 2023*; 3:00 p.m., ESPN+		at San Diego; San Diego Thanksgiving Classic	L 53–56	0–5	18 – Matthews	7 – Lesane	6 – K. Parra	Jenny Craig Pavilion (555); San Diego, CA
November 25, 2023*; 3:00 p.m., ESPN+		vs. UC Santa Barbara; San Diego Thanksgiving Classic	L 51–61	0–6	17 – Hickok	9 – Raidaveta	5 – Raidaveta	Jenny Craig Pavilion (221); San Diego, CA
November 29, 2023*; 12:00 p.m., P12N		at Oregon State	L 53–79	0–7	9 – 2 tied	6 – Raidaveta	3 – Matthews	Gill Coliseum (8,454); Corvallis, OR
December 6, 2023*; 5:30 p.m., ESPN+		Nevada	W 57–55	1–7	17 – Hickok	8 – Adamson	3 – 3 tied	Dee Events Center (385); Ogden, UT
December 9, 2023*; 2:00 p.m., ESPN+		at Utah Tech	W 77–67	2–7	25 – Hickok	7 – Raidaveta	5 – K. Parra	Burns Arena (367); St. George, UT
December 12, 2023*; 7:30 p.m., ESPN+		Westminster	W 61–47	3–7	18 – Hickok	9 – Matthews	3 – Taylor	Dee Events Center (386); Ogden, UT
December 16, 2023*; 1:00 p.m., MWN		at Air Force	L 58–70	3–8	11 – 2 tied	7 – Matthews	3 – Lesane	Clune Arena (214); Colorado Springs, CO
December 21, 2023*; 12:00 p.m., P12N		at No. 11 Utah	L 36–89	3–9	8 – K. Parra	5 – Hickok	3 – K. Parra	Jon M. Huntsman Center (4,442); Salt Lake City, UT
December 29, 2023; 7:00 p.m., ESPN+		at Montana	L 71–87	3–10 (0–1)	21 – Hickok	8 – Hickok	3 – 2 tied	Dahlberg Arena (2,637); Missoula, MT
December 31, 2023; 2:00 p.m., ESPN+		at Montana State	L 43–57	3–11 (0–2)	11 – Taylor	8 – Raidaveta	4 – K. Parra	Worthington Arena (1,701); Bozeman, MT
January 6, 2024*; 12:00 p.m., ESPN+		Kansas City; Big Sky–Summit Challenge	L 51–61	3–12	16 – Hickok	9 – Matthews	4 – Eskelson	Dee Events Center (356); Ogden, UT
January 11, 2024; 6:00 p.m., ESPN+		Sacramento State	W 81–61	4–12 (1–2)	30 – Matthews	11 – Matthews	5 – Matthews	Dee Events Center (221); Ogden, UT
January 13, 2024; 2:00 p.m., ESPN+		Portland State	W 89–53	5–12 (2–2)	17 – Matthews	8 – Taylor	9 – Parra	Dee Events Center (359); Ogden, UT
January 18, 2024; 12:00 p.m., ESPN+		at Eastern Washington	L 38–56	5–13 (2–3)	11 – 2 tied	10 – Smith	2 – 2 tied	Reese Court (2,231); Cheney, WA
January 20, 2024; 3:00 p.m., ESPN+		at Idaho	W 61–56	6–13 (3–3)	19 – Matthews	11 – Matthews	4 – Taylor	ICCU Arena (1,109); Moscow, ID
January 22, 2024; 6:00 p.m., ESPN+		Montana	L 55–87	6–14 (3–4)	13 – Hickok	9 – Smith	3 – Parra	Dee Events Center (280); Ogden, UT
January 27, 2024; 2:00 p.m., ESPN+		at Idaho State	L 47–55	6–15 (3–5)	17 – Hickok	7 – 2 tied	2 – Matthews	Reed Gym (993); Pocatello, ID
February 1, 2024; 6:00 p.m., ESPN+		Northern Arizona	L 65–85	6–16 (3–6)	15 – Parra	8 – Raidaveta	4 – Taylor	Dee Events Center (255); Ogden, UT
February 3, 2024; 12:00 p.m., ESPN+		Northern Colorado	L 63–73	6–17 (3–7)	14 – Matthews	7 – Parra	6 – Parra	Dee Events Center (331); Ogden, UT
February 8, 2024; 7:00 p.m., ESPN+		at Portland State	W 67–46	7–17 (4–7)	18 – 2 tied	8 – Taylor	7 – Parra	Viking Pavilion (421); Portland, OR
February 10, 2024; 3:00 p.m., ESPN+		at Sacramento State	L 44–75	7–18 (4–8)	18 – Hickok	8 – Hickok	2 – Hickok	Hornets Nest (469); Sacramento, CA
February 15, 2024; 6:00 p.m., ESPN+		Idaho	L 47–60	7–19 (4–9)	16 – Parra	8 – Smith	2 – 3 tied	Dee Events Center (333); Ogden, UT
February 17, 2024; 2:00 p.m., ESPN+		Eastern Washington	L 54–74	7–20 (4–10)	14 – Hickok	6 – Parra	4 – Hickok	Dee Events Center (331); Ogden, UT
February 24, 2024; 2:00 p.m., ESPN+		Idaho State	L 57–72	7–21 (4–11)	19 – Parra	7 – Smith	3 – 2 tied	Dee Events Center (671); Ogden, UT
February 29, 2024; 6:00 p.m., ESPN+		at Northern Colorado	L 64–72	7–22 (4–12)	14 – Matthews	5 – 2 tied	2 – 2 tied	Bank of Colorado Arena (635); Greeley, CO
March 2, 2024; 2:00 p.m., ESPN+		at Northern Arizona	L 41–73	7–23 (4–13)	20 – Hickok	8 – Smith	2 – Parra	Findlay Toyota Court (662); Flagstaff, AZ
March 4, 2024; 6:00 p.m., ESPN+		Montana State	L 65–67	7–24 (4–14)	12 – 3 tied	8 – Parra	5 – Parra	Dee Events Center (370); Ogden, UT
Big Sky tournament
March 9, 2024; 12:00 p.m., ESPN+	(9)	vs. (10) Portland State; First round	W 62–53	8–24	14 – Raidaveta	8 – Hickok	2 – Parra	Idaho Central Arena; Boise, ID
March 10, 2024; 12:00 p.m., ESPN+	(9)	vs. (1) Eastern Washington; Quarterfinals	L 58–71	8–25	21 – Hickok	16 – Matthews	4 – Taylor	Idaho Central Arena; Boise, ID
*Non-conference game. ^{#}Rankings from AP poll. (#) Tournament seedings in parentheses. All times are in Mountain.
