= 2024 Big Sky Conference women's basketball tournament =

American collegiate postseason tournament

- Classification: Division I
- Season: 2023–24
- Teams: 10
- Site: Idaho Central Arena; Boise, Idaho
- Champions: Eastern Washington (2nd title)
- Winning coach: Joddie Gleason (1st title)
- MVP: Jamie Loera (Eastern Washington)
- Television: ESPN+, ESPNU

2023–24 Big Sky women's basketball standings
	Conf.				Overall
Team	W		L	PCT	W		L	PCT
Eastern Washington †	16	–	2	.889	29	–	6	.829
Northern Arizona	15	–	3	.833	25	–	9	.735
Montana	13	–	5	.722	23	–	10	.697
Montana State	10	–	8	.556	17	–	16	.515
Northern Colorado	10	–	8	.556	15	–	16	.484
Idaho	8	–	10	.444	15	–	16	.484
Idaho State	7	–	11	.389	11	–	19	.367
Sacramento State	4	–	14	.222	6	–	25	.194
Weber State	4	–	14	.222	8	–	25	.242
Portland State	3	–	15	.167	8	–	23	.258
† 2024 Big Sky tournament winner

The 2024 Big Sky Conference women's basketball tournament was the postseason tournament for the Big Sky Conference, held March 9–13 at Idaho Central Arena in Boise, Idaho. It was the 41st edition of the tournament, which debuted in 1983. The winner will receive the Big Sky's automatic bid to the 2024 NCAA tournament.

== Seeds ==
The ten teams were seeded by conference record, with a tiebreaker system for identical conference records. The top six teams will receive a first-round bye.

Seed	School	Record	Tiebreaker
1	Eastern Washington	16–2	
2	Northern Arizona	15–3	
3	Montana	13–5	
4	Montana State	10–8	1–1 vs. Eastern Washington
5	Northern Colorado	10–8	0–2 vs. Eastern Washington
6	Idaho	8–10	
7	Idaho State	7–11	
8	Sacramento State	4–14	1–1 vs. Northern Arizona
9	Weber State	4–14	0–2 vs. Northern Arizona
10	Portland State	3–15	

== Schedule ==
Session	Game	Time	Matchup	Score	Television
First round – Saturday, March 9
1	1	12:00 pm	No. 9 Weber State vs. No. 10 Portland State	62–53	ESPN+
1	2	2:30 pm	No. 7 Idaho State vs. No. 8 Sacramento State	55–73	ESPN+
Quarterfinals – Sunday, March 10
2	3	12:00 pm	No. 1 Eastern Washington vs. No. 9 Weber State	71–58	ESPN+
2	4	2:30 pm	No. 2 Northern Arizona vs. No. 8 Sacramento State	81–63	ESPN+
Quarterfinals – Monday, March 11
3	5	12:00 pm	No. 4 Montana State vs. No. 5 Northern Colorado	47–44^{OT}	ESPN+
3	6	2:30 pm	No. 3 Montana vs. No. 6 Idaho	73–61	ESPN+
Semifinals – Tuesday, March 12
4	7	12:00 pm	No. 1 Eastern Washington vs. No. 4 Montana State	56–39	ESPN+
4	8	2:30 pm	No. 2 Northern Arizona vs. No. 3 Montana	74–67	ESPN+
Championship game – Wednesday, March 13
5	9	3:00 pm	No. 1 Eastern Washington vs. No. 2 Northern Arizona	73–64	ESPNU
Game times in MT. Rankings denote tournament seeding.

== Bracket ==
First round March 9 ESPN+
9	Weber State	62
10	Portland State	53
7	Idaho State	55
8	Sacramento State	73

Quarterfinals; March 10 & 11; ESPN+
1	Eastern Washington	71
9	Weber State	58
4	Montana State	47*
5	Northern Colorado	44
2	Northern Arizona	81
8	Sacramento State	63
3	Montana	73
6	Idaho	61

Semifinals; March 12; ESPN+
1	Eastern Washington	56
4	Montana State	39
2	Northern Arizona	74
3	Montana	67

Championship; March 13; ESPNU
1	Eastern Washington	73
2	Northern Arizona	64
