= Washougal High School =

Coordinates: 45°35′05″N 122°19′40″W

Location
- 1201 39th St; Washougal, Washington; United States

Information
- Type: Public
- Established: Early 1900s
- School district: Washougal School District
- Principal: Mark Castle
- Teaching staff: 43.49 (FTE)
- Enrollment: 990 (2023–2024)
- Student to teacher ratio: 22.76
- Colors: Black & Orange
- Mascot: Panther

Washougal High School is a public high school in Washougal, Washington, and a part of the Washougal School District.

The boundary of the school district includes most of Washougal and a part of Fern Prairie.

== History ==
It was founded in 1909, where it only had four students. The current campus was built in 1956 and remodeled in 2002. Known for its Fine Arts Programs, including the band program, culinary, woodworking and metalworking, and athletics. 1,010 students attend WHS as of the 2022–2023 school year.

Washougal High School is a public school in the Washougal School District founded in the early 1909 in Clark County, Washington. They made a bigger building in 1910. In 1915, there were around 45 people enrolled in the high school.

In spring 2022, 68.8% of the kids meant English standards, 34.7% meant math standards, and 44.8% meant science standards.
