= Idaho Vandals women's basketball =

College basketball team

2026–27 Idaho Vandals women's basketball team
- University: University of Idaho
- Head coach: Arthur Moreira (3rd season)
- Location: Moscow, Idaho
- Arena: Idaho Central Credit Union Arena (since autumn 2021) (capacity: 4,200)
- Conference: Big Sky
- Nickname: Vandals
- Colors: Silver and Vandal gold

NCAA Division I tournament appearances
- 1985, 2013, 2014, 2016, 2026

AIAW tournament appearances
- Division II: 1980, 1981

Conference tournament champions
- 1985, 2013, 2014, 2016, 2026

Conference regular-season champions
- 1985, 2013, 2014, 2016, 2019, 2026

Uniforms
Home	Away

The Idaho Vandals women's basketball is the team representing the University of Idaho in women's basketball in the Big Sky Conference in NCAA Division I. They play home games are played on their campus at Idaho Central Credit Union Arena in Moscow, Idaho.

Opened in autumn 2021, ICCU Arena seats 4,200 and also is home for the Vandals men's basketball team. It is located north of the adjacent Kibbie Dome, the former primary home court, whose basketball configuration was known as Cowan Spectrum; the secondary home court was at Memorial Gymnasium.

== Season-by-season record ==
As of the 2015–16 season, the Vandals have a 598–579 (.508) all-time record, with a 123–117 (.513) record in the Big Sky Conference, which includes the women's-only Mountain West Athletic Conference (1982–88). The program moved from AIAW Division II to NCAA Division I in the summer of 1982.

Idaho has five appearances in the NCAA tournament (1985, 2013, 2014, 2016 and 2026), with no wins. They have two titles in the Big Sky tournament (1985, 2016), with two WAC tournament championships in 2013 and 2014. The Vandals have made one appearance in the predecessor Women's National Invitation Tournament (not the WNIT that currently operates for women) in 1986, winning three games to win a WNIT title. They also made an appearance in the Women's Basketball Invitational in 2011, losing in their only appearance.

Season	Coach	Conference Record	Record
1974–75	Deanne Ercanbrack	—N/a	8–9
1975–76	Bonnie Hulstrand	—N/a	6–13
1976–77	Bonnie Hulstrand	—N/a	2–18
1977–78	Bonnie Hulstrand	—N/a	10–7
1978–79	Tara VanDerveer	—N/a	17–8
1979–80	Tara VanDerveer	10–2 (NW Empire League)	25–6
1980–81	Pat Dobratz	13–1 (NW Empire League)	22–8
1981–82	Pat Dobratz	14–0 (NW Empire League)	27–5
1982–83	Pat Dobratz	8–6 (MWAC)	18–10
1983–84	Pat Dobratz	9–5 (MWAC)	21–9
1984–85	Pat Dobratz	13–1 (MWAC)	28–2
1985–86	Pat Dobratz	11–3 (MWAC)	26–5
1986–87	Laurie Turner	3–9 (MWAC)	8–19
1987–88	Laurie Turner	4–12 (MWAC)	7–20
1988–89	Laurie Turner	11–5 (Big Sky)	18–11
1989–90	Laurie Turner	11–5 (Big Sky)	20–9
1990–91	Laurie Turner	7–9 (Big Sky)	13–14
1991–92	Laurie Turner	9–7 (Big Sky)	16–13
1992–93	Laurie Turner	7–7 (Big Sky)	12–15
1993–94	Laurie Turner	2–12 (Big Sky)	3–22
1994–95	Julie Holt	3–11 (Big Sky)	5–21
1995–96	Julie Holt	4–10 (Big Sky)	8–18
1996–97	Julie Holt	8–6 (Big West)	14–14
1997–98	Julie Holt	9–5 (Big West)	15–15
1998–99	Hilary Recknor	8–6 (Big West)	16–12
1999-00	Hilary Recknor	6–8 (Big West)	13–15
2000–01	Hilary Recknor	4–10 (Big West)	7–21
2001–02	Mike Divilbiss	5–11 (Big West)	11–17
2002–03	Mike Divilbiss	8–8 (Big West)	10–18
2003–04	Mike Divilbiss	13–5 (Big West)	22–7
2004–05	Mike Divilbiss	12–6 (Big West)	19–11
2005–06	Mike Divilbiss	5–11 (WAC)	10–19
2006–07	Mike Divilbiss	3–13 (WAC)	6–22
2007–08	Mike Divilbiss	3–13 (WAC)	4–25
2008–09	Jon Newlee	10–6 (WAC)	13–15
2009–10	Jon Newlee	8–8 (WAC)	11–20
2010–11	Jon Newlee	7–9 (WAC)	15–16
2011–12	Jon Newlee	6–8 (WAC)	12–20
2012–13	Jon Newlee	11–7 (WAC)	17–16
2013–14	Jon Newlee	15–1 (WAC)	25–9
2014–15	Jon Newlee	8–10 (Big Sky)	14–15
2015–16	Jon Newlee	13–5 (Big Sky)	24–10
2016–17	Jon Newlee	11–7 (Big Sky)	19–15
2017–18	Jon Newlee	13–5 (Big Sky)	19–14
2018–19	Jon Newlee	16–4 (Big Sky)	22–12
2019–20	Jon Newlee	15–5 (Big Sky)	22–9
2020–21	Jon Newlee	14–3 (Big Sky)	17–7
2021–22	Jon Newlee	11–9 (Big Sky)	14–18
2022–23	Jon Newlee	9–9 (Big Sky)	13–17
2023–24	Carrie Eighmey	8–10 (Big Sky)	15–16
2024–25	Arthur Moreira	10–8 (Big Sky)	18–12

== Postseason ==
=== NCAA Tournament Results ===
The Vandals have made four appearances in the NCAA Division I women's basketball tournament, with a combined record of 0–5.

Year	Seed	Round	Opponent	Result
1985	#5	First Round	#4 USC	L 51−74
2013	#16	First Round	#1 Connecticut	L 37−105
2014	#14	First Round	#3 Louisville	L 42−88
2016	#16	First Round	#1 Baylor	L 59−89
2026	#13	First Round	#4 Oklahoma	L 59−89

=== WNIT Tournament Results ===
The Vandals have made three appearances in the Women's National Invitation Tournament, and its predecessors, with a combined record of 5–2.

Year	Seed	Round	Opponent	Result
1986	#1	Quarterfinal; Semifinal; Final	Fresno State; Notre Dame; Northwestern State	W 74−61; W 67−65 (OT); W 100−91
2018		First round	Wyoming	L 62–67
2019		First round Second round Third round	Loyola Marymount; Denver; Arizona	W 79–64; W 88–66; L 60–88

=== WBI Tournament Results ===
The Vandals have made on appearance in the Women's Basketball Invitational, with a record of 0–1.

Year	Seed	Round	Opponent	Result
2011	#2	First round	South Dakota	L 47–62

=== AIAW College Division/Division II ===
The Vandals made consecutive appearances in the AIAW Division II tournament, with a combined record of 0–2.

Year	Round	Opponent	Result
1980	First Round	Cal State Los Angeles	L 81–84 (OT)
1981	First Round	William Penn	L 43–63
