= Joddie Gleason =

American basketball coach

Current position
- Title: Head coach
- Team: Eastern Washington
- Conference: Big Sky
- Record: 83–76 (.522)

Playing career
- 1989–1993: Chico State

Coaching career (HC unless noted)
- 1999–2004: Butte
- 2004–2016: Cal Poly Humboldt
- 2016–2021: Seattle (associate HC)
- 2021–present: Eastern Washington

Head coaching record
- Overall: 83–76 (.522)

Accomplishments and honors

Awards
- Big Sky Coach of the Year (2024)

Joddie Gleason (née Vossler) is an American basketball coach and former player who is the current head coach of the Eastern Washington Eagles women's basketball team.

== Coaching career ==
On May 21, 2021, Gleason was hired as head coach at Eastern Washington University. After setting a program record for most wins in a single season in 2023–24, Gleason was named women's basketball coach of the year in the Big Sky Conference.

== Head coaching record ==
Statistics overview
Season	Team	Overall	Conference	Standing	Postseason
Eastern Washington Eagles (Big Sky) (2021–present)
2021–22	Eastern Washington	9–21	7–13	9th	
2022–23	Eastern Washington	19–11	11–7	4th	
2023–24	Eastern Washington	29–6	16–2	1st	NCAA First Round
2024–25	Eastern Washington	11–20	7–11	T-7th	
2025–26	Eastern Washington	15–18	7–11	6th	
Eastern Washington:		83–76 (.522)	48–44 (.522)		
Total:		83–76 (.522)			
National champion Postseason invitational champion Conference regular season champion Conference regular season and conference tournament champion Division regular season champion Division regular season and conference tournament champion Conference tournament champion
