= Eastern Washington Eagles women's basketball =

American college basketball team

Eastern Washington Eagles
2025–26 Eastern Washington Eagles women's basketball team
- University: Eastern Washington University
- Head coach: Joddie Gleason (6th season)
- Location: Cheney, Washington
- Arena: Reese Court (capacity: 6,000)
- Conference: Big Sky
- Nickname: Eagles
- Colors: Red and white
- Student section: Flight Club

NCAA Division I tournament appearances
- 1987, 2024

AIAW tournament appearances
- Division II: 1978, 1979

Conference tournament champions
- 1987, 2024

Conference regular-season champions
- 2010, 2024

Uniforms
Home	Away	Alternate

The Eastern Washington Eagles women's basketball is the team that is representing Eastern Washington University in Cheney, Washington. The team competes in the Big Sky Conference.

== History ==
Eastern Washington began Division I play in 1982. They have qualified for the NCAA Division I Tournament twice: in 1987 after winning the Mountain West Athletic Conference (MWAC) tournament, and in 2024 after winning the Big Sky regular season and tournament titles. They have made the WNIT in 2010, 2013, and 2015. As of the end of the 2019–20 season, the Eagles have an all-time record of 484–601.

== Postseason ==
=== NCAA tournament results ===
The Eagles have appeared in two NCAA tournaments. Their record is 0–2.

Year	Seed	Round	Opponent	Result/Score
1987	7	First Round	(10) Oregon	L 56–75
2024	14	First Round	(3) #12 Oregon State	L 51–73

=== WNIT results ===
The Eagles have appeared in the Women's National Invitation Tournament (WNIT) three times. Their combined record is 1–3.

Year	Round	Opponent	Result/Score
2010	First Round	Oregon	L 66–95
2013	First Round	Washington	L 60–65
2015	First Round; Second Round	Washington State; Sacramento State	W 67–65; L 49–84

=== WBI results ===
The Eagles have appeared in one Women's Basketball Invitational (WBI). Their record is 1–1.

Year	Round	Opponent	Result/Score
2017	First Round; Quarterfinals	Texas State; Idaho	W 66–62; L 67–74

=== AIAW College Division/Division II ===
The Eagles made two appearances in the AIAW National Division II basketball tournament, with a combined record of 0–2.

Year	Round	Opponent	Result
1978	First Round	South Carolina State	L 53–88
1979	First Round	Tuskegee	L 71–80

== Awards ==
Big Sky Most Valuable Player

- Julie Piper – 2010
- Brianne Ryan – 2012
- Jamie Loera – 2024

Big Sky Coach of the Year

- Wendy Schuller – 2010
- Joddie Gleason – 2024

Big Sky Defensive Player of the Year

- Michelle Demetruk – 2003
- Joanna Chadd – 2006
- Brianne Ryan – 2010
- Jamie Loera – 2023, 2024

Big Sky Freshman of the Year

- Kari Schwenke – 1992
- Kristy Missall – 1993
- Hayley Hodgins – 2013
- Delaney Hodgins – 2015
- Maisie Burnham – 2021
- Jaydia Martin – 2022

Big Sky Newcomer of the Year

- Julie Page – 2004

Big Sky Top Reserve of the Year

- Uriah Howard – 2019

Source.
