= Mountain West Athletic Conference =

Former U.S. women's collegiate athletics conference

- Association: NCAA
- Founded: 1982
- Folded: 1988, merged into Big Sky
- Division: Division I
- No. of teams: 9
- Region: Western United States

The Mountain West Athletic Conference (MWAC) was a women's college athletic conference in the western United States.

Launched in the summer of 1982, it existed for six years, until it was merged into the Big Sky Conference in 1988. Founded in 1963, the Big Sky was for men's sports only for its first quarter century.

The Pac-10 Conference had a similar arrangement, with the Northern Pacific Conference and Western Collegiate Athletic Association for women's sports. Each had five Pac-10 members plus several others; the Pac-10 added women's sports in 1986. Similarly, the Western Athletic Conference (WAC) had the "High Country Athletic Conference" for women's sports until 1990, and the Missouri Valley Conference was tied with the Gateway Collegiate Athletic Conference until 1992 (the Gateway would transform into the modern-day Missouri Valley Football Conference).

== Members ==
- Boise State
- Idaho
- Idaho State
- Montana
- Montana State
- Eastern Washington
- Weber State
- Portland State (departed in 1986)
- Nevada (joined in 1987)
- Northern Arizona (joined in 1987)
