= Northern Arizona Lumberjacks women's basketball =

Overview of the sports team

2026–27 Northern Arizona Lumberjacks women's basketball team
- University: Northern Arizona University
- Head coach: Laura Dinkins (2nd season)
- Location: Flagstaff, Arizona
- Arena: Findlay Toyota Court (capacity: 11,230)
- Conference: Big Sky Conference
- Nickname: Lumberjacks
- Colors: Blue and gold

NCAA Division I tournament appearances
- 2006

Conference tournament champions
- 2006

Conference regular-season champions
- 1998, 2023

The Northern Arizona Lumberjacks women's basketball team represents Northern Arizona University, located in Flagstaff, Arizona, in NCAA Division I women's competition. The school's team currently competes in the Big Sky Conference. Laura Dinkins, formerly the associate head coach at Grand Canyon University and NAU alum, was named the head coach of the Lumberjacks program in April 2025. The women's basketball team reached the conference tournament championship in 2023. The Lumberjacks play home games at the Findlay Toyota Court.

== Team record ==
Record table
Season	Coach	Overall	Postseason	
Joyce Gedde (Intermountain Conference) (1974–1976)
1974–75	Joyce Gedde	2-10	0-7	
1975–76	Joyce Gedde	0-14	0-13	
Joyce Gedde:		2-24	0-20	
Sue Lambert (Intermountain Conference) (1982–1984)
1976–77	Sue Lambert	5-14	2-11	
1977–78	Sue Lambert	5-14	3-11	
Sue Lambert:		10-28	5-22	
Linda French (Intermountain Conference) (1974–1976)
1978–79	Linda French	5-15		
1979–80	Linda French	4-22		
Linda French:		9-37		
Paulette Gebert (Intermountain Conference) (1980–1982)
1980–81	Paulette Gebert	4-20	1-9	
1981–82	Paulette Gebert	6-20	1-9	
Paulette Gebert (Independent) (1982–1983)
1982–83	Paulette Gebert	9–15		
Paulette Gebert:		19-55		
Dave Brown (Independent) (1983–1987)
1983–84	Dave Brown	10-14		
1984–85	Dave Brown	12-14		
1985–86	Dave Brown	17-8		
1986–87	Dave Brown	9-18		
Dave Brown (Mountain West Conference) (1987–1988)
1987–88	Dave Brown	14-15	8-8	
Dave Brown (Big Sky Conference) (1988–1990)
1988–89	Dave Brown	12-14	6–10	
1989–90	Dave Brown	11-17	6–10	
Dave Brown:		85-100	12-20	
Linda Bruns (Big Sky Conference) (1990–1993)
1990–91	Linda Bruns	1-26	1-15	
1991–92	Linda Bruns	7-20	0-16	
1992–93	Linda Bruns	4–24	0-14	
Linda Bruns:		10-70	1-45	
Charli Turner (Big Sky Conference) (1993–1996)
1993–94	Charli Turner	12–15	6-8	
1994–95	Charli Turner Thorne	14–12		
1995–96	Charli Turner Thorne	14–13	6-8	
Charli Turner Thorne:		40-40	18-24	
Meg Sanders (Big Sky Conference) (1996–2003)
1996–97	Meg Sanders	17-11	10-6	
1997–98	Meg Sanders	22-6	15-1	
1998–99	Meg Sanders	14-14	7-9	
1999–2000	Meg Sanders	11-18	7-9	
2000–01	Meg Sanders	13-17	10-6	
2001–02	Meg Sanders	17–11	10-6	
2002–03	Meg Sanders	13-15	6-8	
Meg Sanders:		107-92	65-43	
Laurie Kelly (Big Sky Conference) (2003–2012)
2003–04	Laurie Kelly	12-16	5-9	
2004–05	Laurie Kelly	19-10	9-5	
2005–06	Laurie Kelly	22-11	9-5	
2006–07	Laurie Kelly	20-12	11-5	
2007–08	Laurie Kelly	10-20	6-10	
2008–09	Laurie Kelly	9-21	6-10	
2009–10	Laurie Kelly	5-24	3-13	
2010–11	Laurie Kelly	11-18	6-10	
2011–12	Laurie Kelly	9-20	4-12	
Laurie Kelly:		117-152	59-79	
Sue Darling (Big Sky Conference) (2013–2016)
2012–13	Sue Darling	8-21	7-13	
2013–14	Sue Darling	9–20	6–14	
2014–15	Sue Darling	13-17	9-9	
2015–16	Sue Darling	6–24	2–16	
Sue Darling:		32-114		
Robyne Bostick (Big Sky Conference) (2016–2017)
2016-17	Robyne Bostick	9-21	5-13	
Robyne Bostick :		9-21	5–13	
Loree Payne (Big Sky Conference) (2017–2025)
2017-18	Loree Payne	7-23	4-14	
2018-19	Loree Payne	13-18	8-12	
2019-20	Loree Payne	16-15	12-8	NCAA Tournament canceled
2020-21	Loree Payne	16-5	12-2	
2021-22	Loree Payne	17-14	12-8	
2022-23	Loree Payne	21-14	13-5	
2023-24	Loree Payne	25-10	15-3	
2024-25	Loree Payne	27-8	16-2	
Loree Payne:		136–116	88–62	
Laura Dinkins (Big Sky Conference) (2025–present)
2025-6	Laura Dinkins	10-22	6-12	
Laura Dinkins:		10-22	6-12	
Total:				
National champion Postseason invitational champion Conference regular season champion Conference regular season and conference tournament champion Division regular season champion Division regular season and conference tournament champion Conference tournament champion

== Postseason appearances ==
=== NCAA tournament results ===
The Lumberjacks have made one NCAA Tournament appearance. They have a record of 0–1.

Year	Seed	Round	Opponent	Result
2006	#14	First Round	#3 Baylor	L 56–74

=== WNIT results ===
The Lumberjacks have made two WNIT appearances. They have a record of 0–2.

Year	Round	Opponent	Result
2023	First Round	New Mexico	L 64–72

Year	Round	Opponent	Result
2024	Second Round	South Dakota	L 65–79

=== WBIT results ===
The Lumberjacks made their first WBIT appearance in 2025. They have a record of 1-1.

Year	Round	Opponent	Result
2025	First Round	Arizona	W 71-69
2025	Second Round	Belmont	L 80-81
