= Portland State Vikings women's basketball =

American college basketball team

Portland State Vikings men's basketball
2025–26 Portland State Vikings women's basketball team
- University: Portland State University
- Head coach: Karlie Burris (1st season)
- Location: Portland, Oregon
- Arena: Viking Pavilion (capacity: 3,094)
- Conference: Big Sky
- Nickname: Vikings
- Colors: Green, white, and silver

NCAA Division I tournament runner-up
- Div. II: 1995
Other NCAA Division I tournament results
Final Four	Div. II: 1992, 1995
Elite Eight	Div. II: 1992, 1995, 1996
Sweet Sixteen	Div. II: 1992, 1994, 1995, 1996
Appearances	Div. I: 2010, 2019; Div. II: 1992, 1993, 1994, 1995, 1996

AIAW tournament appearances
- 1976

Conference tournament champions
- Big Sky: 2010, 2019

Conference regular-season champions
- Big Sky: 2011; Pacific West: 1992, 1993, 1994, 1995, 1996

Uniforms
Home	Away

The Portland State Vikings women's basketball team represents Portland State University in Portland, Oregon. The school's team competes in the Big Sky Conference, and plays its games in the Viking Pavilion, a 3,094-seat arena that opened for the 2018–19 season.

== History ==
Portland State began play in 1975, and have qualified for the NCAA Division I women's basketball tournament twice, in 2010 and 2019. They have played in the Big Sky Conference since the 1996–97 season. Since joining the conference, Portland State has won the Big Sky Conference Tournament on two occasions. In 2010, Portland State defeated Montana State University 62–58 in the Big Sky Championship game. In the 2019 Big Sky Championship game, Portland State defeated arch rivals Eastern Washington University 61–59. Portland State has also qualified for the WNIT twice, and won a regular season title in 2011.

Prior to joining the Big Sky, Portland State women's basketball played in NCAA Div. II. During its tenure in Div. II, Portland State played in the Northwest Basketball League from 1977 until 1982. After 1982, Portland State played in the Mountain West Athletic Conference (MWAC) until 1986. From that point, the team played as an Independent through the 1991 season but later joined the Pacific West Conference from 1991 to 1996. In their time in Div. II, they made the Tournament each year from 1992 until 1996, making the Final Four in 1992 and the Elite Eight in 1995 and 1996. They went to the Final Four after beating Alaska Anchorage 101–76, UC Davis 83–56, and Saint Joseph's (IN) 83–62, but lost to North Dakota State 93–59 in the semifinals. Portland State won a consolation game 72–69 against Bentley to be crowned 3rd in the Div. II ranks. As of the end of the 2015–16 season, the Vikings had an all-time record of 553–603.

== Postseason results ==
=== NCAA Division I ===
The Vikings have made two appearances in the NCAA Division I women's basketball tournament. They have a combined record of 0–2.

Year	Seed	Round	Opponent	Result
2010	#15	First round	#2 Texas A&M	L 53−84
2019	#15	First round	#2 Oregon	L 40−78

=== NCAA Division II ===
The Vikings made five appearances in the NCAA Division II women's basketball tournament. They had a combined record of 12–5.

Year	Round	Opponent	Result
1992	First round Regional Finals; Elite Eight; Final Four; Third Place	Alaska Anchorage; UC Davis; St. Joseph's (IN); North Dakota State; Bentley	W 101–76; W 83–56; W 83–62; L 59–93; W 72–69
1993	First round Regional Finals	UC Davis; Cal Poly Pomona	W 64–61; L 51–59
1994	First round Regional Finals	Eastern Montana; Cal State San Bernardino	W 90–54; L 69–79
1995	Regional semifinals Regional Finals; Elite Eight; Final Four; National Championship	Seattle Pacific; UC Davis; Wingate; Stonehill; North Dakota State	W 86–75; W 82–71; W 82–69; W 75–59; L 85–98
1996	Regional semifinals Regional Finals; Elite Eight	Montana State–Billings; UC Davis; North Dakota State	W 83–73; W 70–66; L 65–91

=== AIAW Division I ===
The Vikings made one appearance in the AIAW National Division I basketball tournament, with a combined record of 1–1.

Year	Round	Opponent	Result
1976	First round Consolation First round	Montclair State; Long Beach State	L 49–86; L 54–74

== See also ==
- Women's sports in Portland, Oregon
