= 2024–25 Idaho Vandals women's basketball team =

American college basketball season

2024–25 Idaho Vandals women's basketball
- Conference: Big Sky Conference
- Record: 18–12 (10–8 Big Sky)
- Head coach: Arthur Moreira (1st season)
- Associate head coach: Drew Muscatell
- Assistant coaches: Lindsey Foster; Denise Rosario; Derek Saich
- Home arena: ICCU Arena

2024–25 Big Sky women's basketball standings
	Conf.				Overall
Team	W		L	PCT	W		L	PCT
Montana State †	17	–	1	.944	30	–	4	.882
Northern Arizona	16	–	2	.889	27	–	8	.771
Idaho	10	–	8	.556	18	–	12	.600
Weber State	10	–	8	.556	13	–	16	.448
Idaho State	8	–	10	.444	14	–	17	.452
Montana	8	–	10	.444	14	–	18	.438
Eastern Washington	7	–	11	.389	11	–	20	.355
Sacramento State	7	–	11	.389	15	–	18	.455
Northern Colorado	6	–	12	.333	14	–	17	.452
Portland State	1	–	17	.056	4	–	24	.143
† 2025 Big Sky tournament winner

The 2024–25 Idaho Vandals women's basketball team represented the University of Idaho during the 2024–25 NCAA Division I women's basketball season. The Vandals, led by first-year head coach Arthur Moreira, played their home games at the Idaho Central Credit Union Arena in Moscow, Idaho, as members of the Big Sky Conference.

== Previous season ==
The Vandals finished the 2023–24 season 15–16, 8–10 in Big Sky play to finish in sixth place. They were defeated by Montana in the quarterfinals of the Big Sky tournament.

On April 30, 2024, it was announced that head coach Carrie Eighmey would be leaving the program after only one year, in order to take the head coaching position at South Dakota. On June 24, the school announced that associate head coach Arthur Moreira would be named the Vandals' new head coach, becoming the first Brazilian head coach in NCAA Division I history.

== Roster ==
2024–25 Idaho Vandals women's basketball team
Players
Coaches

Pos.	#	Name	Height	Year	Previous school	Hometown
G	1	Olivia Nelson	5 ft 6 in (1.68 m)	GS	Central Missouri	Kansas City, Missouri
F	2	Sarah Brans	6 ft 1 in (1.85 m)	Jr	Monte Vista High School	Dublin, California
G	3	Ashlyn Wallace	5 ft 6 in (1.68 m)	Sr	Clarkston High School	Lapwai, Idaho
G	4	Hope Hassmann	5 ft 8 in (1.73 m)	So	Cal State Fullerton	Maple Valley, Washington
G	5	Ella Uriarte	5 ft 8 in (1.73 m)	Fr	Folsom High School	Folsom, California
F	8	Rosie Schweizer	6 ft 1 in (1.85 m)	GS	Pacific	Canberra, Australia
G	10	Kelbie Washington	5 ft 7 in (1.7 m)	RS So	Oklahoma	Norman, Oklahoma
C	11	Vitória Carvalho	6 ft 3 in (1.91 m)	Sr	Tarleton State	Rio de Janeiro, Brazil
G	12	Anja Bukvic	5 ft 10 in (1.78 m)	Jr	Louisiana Tech	Belgrade, Serbia
F	13	Catelyn Deaver	6 ft 0 in (1.83 m)	Jr	Utah Tech	Sumner, Washington
G	21	Mackenzie Curtis	5 ft 10 in (1.78 m)	RS Jr	New Mexico	Lakeside, California
G	23	Ana Beatriz Passos Alves da Silva	5 ft 11 in (1.8 m)	Fr	Brazil U19 national team	São Paulo, Brazil
G	37	Ana Pinheiro	6 ft 0 in (1.83 m)	Fr	Portugal U18 national team	Braga, Portugal
F	45	Jennifer Aadland	6 ft 1 in (1.85 m)	GS	Augustana	Laramie, Wyoming

Head coach

- Arthur Moreira (Sonoma State)

Assistant coach(es)

- Drew Muscatell (Oregon)
- Lindsey Foster (La Verne)
- Denise Rosario (Columbia (MO))
- Derek Saich (UC Santa Barbara)

Legend

- (C) Team captain
- (S) Suspended
- (I) Ineligible
- (W) Walk-on
- Injured
- Current redshirt

Roster
Last update: January 11, 2025

== Schedule and results ==
Date time, TV	Rank^{#}	Opponent^{#}	Result	Record	High points	High rebounds	High assists	Site (attendance) city, state
Exhibition
October 25, 2024*; 6:00 pm		Lewis–Clark State	W 79–49	–	–	–	–	ICCU Arena; Moscow, ID
Non-conference regular season
November 6, 2024*; 6:00 pm, ESPN+		at BYU	L 62–67	0–1	23 – Hassmann	11 – Aadland	3 – Tied	Marriott Center (2,876); Provo, UT
November 10, 2024*; 12:00 pm, ESPN+		at Washington State; Battle of the Palouse	L 60–71	0–2	23 – Schweizer	18 – Aadland	4 – Hassmann	Beasley Coliseum (1,114); Pullman, WA
November 13, 2024*; 6:00 pm, ESPN+		Walla Walla	W 76–51	1–2	14 – Schweizer	10 – Aadland	4 – Hassmann	ICCU Arena (1,195); Moscow, ID
November 16, 2024*; 1:00 pm, ESPN+		at Southern Utah	W 66–53	2–2	15 – Aadland	8 – Aadland	4 – Nelson	America First Event Center (355); Cedar City, UT
November 20, 2024*; 11:00 am, ESPN+		at UC Riverside	W 56–42	3–2	21 – Schweizer	12 – Aadland	6 – Nelson	SRC Arena (88); Riverside, CA
November 23, 2024*; 1:00 pm, ESPN+		at Cal Poly	W 74–54	4–2	15 – Hassmann	9 – Schweizer	4 – Hassmann	Mott Athletics Center (392); San Luis Obispo, CA
November 27, 2024*; 2:00 pm, ESPN+		Montana Tech	W 94–54	5–2	24 – Bukvic	7 – Tied	4 – Tied	ICCU Arena (1,116); Moscow, ID
December 7, 2024*; 12:00 pm, ESPN+		St. Thomas; Big Sky-Summit League Challenge	W 76–54	6–2	21 – Schweizer	12 – Aadland	4 – Tied	Memorial Gym (1,199); Moscow, ID
December 15, 2024*; 1:00 pm, ESPN+		Utah State	W 71–56	7–2	20 – Nelson	14 – Aadland	6 – Tied	ICCU Arena; Moscow, ID
December 18, 2024*; 11:00 am, ESPN+		UC Davis	L 58–65	7–3	20 – Nelson	12 – Aadland	4 – Nelson	ICCU Arena (2,024); Moscow, ID
December 21, 2024*; 2:30 pm, ESPN+		at Cal State Northridge	W 68–52	8–3	18 – Hassmann	10 – Aadland	4 – Tied	Premier America Credit Union Arena (275); Northridge, CA
Big Sky regular season
January 2, 2025; 6:00 pm, ESPN+		at Montana State	L 56–59	8–4 (0–1)	12 – Aadland	8 – Aadland	4 – Hassmann	Worthington Arena (1,527); Bozeman, MT
January 4, 2025; 1:00 pm, ESPN+		at Montana	W 63–50	9–4 (1–1)	20 – Hassmann	6 – Aadland	3 – Hassmann	Dahlberg Arena (2,268); Missoula, MT
January 9, 2025; 6:00 pm, ESPN+		Sacramento State	W 63–48	10–4 (2–1)	16 – Hassmann	18 – Aadland	4 – Nelson	ICCU Arena; Moscow, ID
January 11, 2025; 2:00 pm, ESPN+		Portland State	W 60–56	11–4 (3–1)	19 – Nelson	14 – Schweizer	4 – Nelson	ICCU Arena (1,242); Moscow, ID
January 18, 2025; 1:00 pm, ESPN+		Eastern Washington	W 67–57	12–4 (4–1)	29 – Nelson	12 – Bukvic	4 – Bukvic	ICCU Arena (2,246); Moscow, ID
January 20, 2025; 2:00 pm, ESPN+		Montana	W 70–57	13–4 (5–1)	15 – Nelson	8 – Aadland	9 – Hassmann	ICCU Arena (1,209); Moscow, ID
January 23, 2025; 6:00 pm, ESPN+		at Northern Colorado	W 68–57	14–4 (6–1)	27 – Nelson	8 – Nelson	3 – Hassmann	Bank of Colorado Arena (616); Greeley, CO
January 25, 2025; 11:00 am, ESPN+		at Northern Arizona	L 76–106	14–5 (6–2)	14 – Tied	5 – Schweizer	2 – Tied	Findlay Toyota Court (405); Flagstaff, AZ
January 30, 2025; 6:00 pm, ESPN+		Weber State	W 77–62	15–5 (7–2)	30 – Nelson	11 – Aadland	8 – Hassmann	ICCU Arena (1,424); Moscow, ID
February 1, 2025; 2:00 pm, ESPN+		Idaho State; Battle of the Domes	L 44–52	15–6 (7–3)	14 – Nelson	9 – Aadland	3 – Hassmann	ICCU Arena (1,426); Moscow, ID
February 6, 2025; 7:00 pm, ESPN+		at Portland State	W 66–62	16–6 (8–3)	17 – Bukvic	13 – Schweizer	5 – Nelson	Viking Pavilion (359); Portland, OR
February 8, 2025; 1:00 pm, ESPN+		at Sacramento State	L 53–56	16–7 (8–4)	19 – Hassmann	10 – Aadland	3 – Nelson	Hornets Nest (623); Sacramento, CA
February 15, 2025; 1:00 pm, ESPN+		at Eastern Washington	L 60–63	16–8 (8–5)	20 – Nelson	9 – Aadland	5 – Hassmann	Reese Court (930); Cheney, WA
February 20, 2025; 6:00 pm, ESPN+		Northern Arizona	L 65–70	16–9 (8–6)	16 – Bukvic	12 – Schweizer	5 – Nelson	ICCU Arena (1,393); Moscow, ID
February 22, 2025; 2:00 pm, ESPN+		Northern Colorado	W 77–59	17–9 (9–6)	31 – Nelson	9 – Schweizer	5 – Hassmann	ICCU Arena (1,314); Moscow, ID
February 27, 2025; 6:00 pm, ESPN+		at Idaho State; Battle of the Domes	L 69–75	17–10 (9–7)	19 – Tied	8 – Aadland	6 – Nelson	Reed Gym (1,036); Pocatello, ID
March 1, 2025; 2:00 pm, ESPN+		at Weber State	L 58–73	18–10 (10–7)	21 – Hassmann	13 – Aadland	7 – Hassman	Dee Events Center (405); Ogden, UT
March 3, 2025; 6:00 pm, ESPN+		Montana State	L 54–67	18–11 (10–8)	14 – Nelson	8 – Aadland	3 – Hassmann	ICCU Arena (1,347); Moscow, ID
Big Sky tournament
March 10, 2025; 2:30 pm, ESPN+	(3)	vs. (6) Montana; Quarterfinals	L 54–65	18–12	17 – Tied	10 – Aadland	3 – Hassmann	Idaho Central Arena (425); Boise, ID
*Non-conference game. ^{#}Rankings from AP Poll. (#) Tournament seedings in parentheses. All times are in Pacific.
