= 2024–25 Idaho State Bengals women's basketball team =

American college basketball season

2024–25 Idaho State Bengals women's basketball
- Conference: Big Sky Conference
- Record: 14–17 (8–10 Big Sky)
- Head coach: Seton Sobolewski (17th season)
- Assistant coaches: Patrick Bowlin; Dora Goles; Jason Alvine
- Home arena: Reed Gym

2024–25 Big Sky women's basketball standings
	Conf.				Overall
Team	W		L	PCT	W		L	PCT
Montana State †	17	–	1	.944	30	–	4	.882
Northern Arizona	16	–	2	.889	27	–	8	.771
Idaho	10	–	8	.556	18	–	12	.600
Weber State	10	–	8	.556	13	–	16	.448
Idaho State	8	–	10	.444	14	–	17	.452
Montana	8	–	10	.444	14	–	18	.438
Eastern Washington	7	–	11	.389	11	–	20	.355
Sacramento State	7	–	11	.389	15	–	18	.455
Northern Colorado	6	–	12	.333	14	–	17	.452
Portland State	1	–	17	.056	4	–	24	.143
† 2025 Big Sky tournament winner

The 2024–25 Idaho State Bengals women's basketball team represented Idaho State University during the 2024–25 NCAA Division I women's basketball season. The Bengals, led by 17th-year head coach Seton Sobolewski, played their home games at Reed Gym in Pocatello, Idaho as members of the Big Sky Conference.

== Previous season ==
The Bengals finished the 2023–24 season 11–19, 7–11 in Big Sky play, to finish in seventh place. They were defeated by Sacramento State in the first round of the Big Sky tournament.

== Roster ==
2024–25 Idaho State Bengals women's basketball team
Players
Coaches

Pos.	#	Name	Height	Year	Previous school	Hometown
G	1	Kacey Spink	5 ft 9 in (1.75 m)	Jr	Ferris High School	Spokane, WA
G	2	Priscila Varela	5 ft 9 in (1.75 m)	RS Jr	Pima Community College	Cabinda, Angola
G	3	Cam Collman	5 ft 8 in (1.73 m)	RS Jr	Portland	La Grande, OR
G	5	Tasia Jordan	5 ft 8 in (1.73 m)	Sr	Kirkwood Community College	Melrose Park, IL
G	6	Ruby Sweeney-Spitzeck	5 ft 8 in (1.73 m)	Jr	Northeastern Junior College	Melbourne, Australia
G	7	Molly Hays	5 ft 8 in (1.73 m)	Fr	Cody High School	Cody, WY
G	10	Alyse Aby	5 ft 11 in (1.8 m)	So	Laurel High School	Laurel, MT
G	11	Nika Lokica	5 ft 10 in (1.78 m)	RS So	V.gimnazija Vladimir Nazor Split	Split, Croatia
F	12	Mackenzie Marenchin	6 ft 2 in (1.88 m)	Fr	Lincoln Prep School	Windsor, ON
G	13	Maria Dias	5 ft 9 in (1.75 m)	Sr	College of the Sequoias	Lisbon, Portugal
F	14	Piper Carlson	6 ft 1 in (1.85 m)	So	Albertville High School	Albertville, MN
F	20	Aurora Elder	6 ft 3 in (1.91 m)	Fr	Sage Hill School	Perris, CA
F	21	Milana Nenadic	6 ft 3 in (1.91 m)	RS So	Maine	Kitchener, ON
G	22	Sophia Covello	5 ft 9 in (1.75 m)	RS Jr	Woodcreek High School	Roseville, CA
F	24	Halle Wright	6 ft 0 in (1.83 m)	Jr	Prosser High School	Prosser, WA

Head coach

- Seton Sobolewski (Northern Arizona)

Assistant coach(es)

- Patrick Bowlin (St. John's)
- Dora Goles (Idaho State)
- Jason Alvine (Northern Colorado)

Legend

- (C) Team captain
- (S) Suspended
- (I) Ineligible
- (W) Walk-on
- Injured
- Current redshirt

Roster
Last update: January 14, 2025

== Schedule and results ==
Date time, TV	Rank^{#}	Opponent^{#}	Result	Record	High points	High rebounds	High assists	Site (attendance) city, state
Exhibition
November 1, 2024*; 7:00 p.m.		Northwest Nazarene	W 76–62	–	18 – Wright	10 – Carlson	6 – Dias	Reed Gym (623); Pocatello, ID
Non-conference regular season
November 4, 2024*; 7:00 p.m., ESPN+		Arizona Christian	W 91–52	1–0	15 – Carlson	7 – Lokica	5 – Dias	Reed Gym (738); Pocatello, ID
November 7, 2024*; 12:00 p.m., ACCNX		at California	L 36–88	1–1	7 – 2 tied	6 – Carlson	2 – Lokica	Haas Pavilion (5,066); Berkeley, CA
November 11, 2024*; 7:00 p.m.		at San Diego State	L 51–62	1–2	16 – Carlson	12 – Spink	3 – Spink	Viejas Arena (917); San Diego, CA
November 16, 2024*; 7:00 p.m., ESPN+		BYU	L 68–77	1–3	19 – Covello	11 – Spink	5 – Spink	Reed Gym (2,133); Pocatello, ID
November 21, 2024*; 7:00 p.m., ESPN+		Westminster	W 64–43	2–3	12 – Wright	10 – Wright	6 – Spink	Reed Gym (760); Pocatello, ID
November 24, 2024*; 3:00 p.m., ESPN+		at No. 19 TCU	L 46–86	2–4	15 – Wright	7 – Spink	5 – Covello	Schollmaier Arena (2,293); Fort Worth, TX
November 28, 2024*; 2:00 p.m., FloHoops		vs. Vermont; Cancún Challenge Riviera Division	L 44–64	2–5	8 – Carlson	9 – Carlson	3 – 2 tied	Hard Rock Hotel Riviera Maya (151); Cancún, Mexico
November 29, 2024*; 2:00 p.m., FloHoops		vs. Rhode Island; Cancún Challenge Riviera Division	W 52–50	3–5	13 – Covello	8 – Spink	2 – 2 tied	Hard Rock Hotel Riviera Maya (200); Cancún, Mexico
December 4, 2024*; 7:00 p.m., ESPN+		Denver; Big Sky–Summit League Challenge	W 73–61	4–5	11 – 3 tied	10 – Spink	3 – 2 tied	Reed Gym (687); Pocatello, ID
December 7, 2024*; 1:00 p.m., SLN		at Kansas City; Big Sky–Summit League Challenge	W 67–50	5–5	26 – Dias	7 – 2 tied	4 – Spink	Swinney Center (212); Kansas City, MO
December 20, 2024*; 12:00 p.m., ESPN+		at Northern Illinois	L 50–51 ^{OT}	5–6	16 – Wright	9 – Carlson	2 – Spink	Convocation Center (705); DeKalb, IL
Big Sky regular season
January 2, 2025; 7:00 p.m., ESPN+		Northern Arizona	L 71–79	5–7 (0–1)	15 – Dias	10 – Spink	3 – Spink	Reed Gym (816); Pocatello, ID
January 4, 2025; 2:00 p.m., ESPN+		Northern Colorado	W 58–50	6–7 (1–1)	15 – Jordan	14 – Carlson	4 – Covello	Reed Gym; Pocatello, ID
January 11, 2025; 2:00 p.m., ESPN+		at Weber State	L 67–72 ^{OT}	6–8 (1–2)	16 – Covello	8 – Carlson	4 – Aby	Dee Events Center (401); Ogden, UT
January 16, 2025; 7:00 p.m., ESPN+		at Montana State	L 52–94	6–9 (1–3)	10 – Dias	10 – Carlson	1 – 6 tied	Worthington Arena (1,867); Bozeman, MT
January 18, 2025; 2:00 p.m., ESPN+		at Montana	L 60–81	6–10 (1–4)	14 – Covello	8 – Carlson	5 – Spink	Dahlberg Arena (2,638); Missoula, MT
January 23, 2025; 7:00 p.m., ESPN+		Sacramento State	L 63–72	6–11 (1–5)	16 – Covello	7 – Aby	5 – Spink	Reed Gym (828); Pocatello, ID
January 25, 2025; 2:00 p.m., ESPN+		Portland State	W 66–52	7–11 (2–5)	13 – Carlson	11 – 2 tied	5 – Spink	Reed Gym (983); Pocatello, ID
January 30, 2025; 12:00 p.m., ESPN+		at Eastern Washington	L 71–78 ^{OT}	7–12 (2–6)	18 – Carlson	10 – 2 tied	7 – Spink	Reese Court (2,100); Cheney, WA
February 1, 2025; 3:00 p.m., ESPN+		at Idaho; Battle of the Domes	W 52–44	15–6 (7–3)	15 – Covello	15 – Spink	6 – Spink	ICCU Arena (1,426); Moscow, ID
February 3, 2025; 6:00 p.m., ESPN+		at Northern Colorado	L 51–59	8–13 (3–7)	16 – Jordan	7 – 2 tied	3 – Spink	Bank of Colorado Arena (601); Greeley, CO
February 8, 2025; 2:00 p.m., ESPN+		Weber State	L 76–79 ^{OT}	8–14 (3–8)	14 – Covello	13 – Carlson	7 – Covello	Reed Gym (1,162); Pocatello, ID
February 13, 2025; 7:00 p.m., ESPN+		Montana	W 66–46	9–14 (4–8)	14 – Jordan	11 – Spink	6 – Spink	Reed Gym (752); Pocatello, ID
February 15, 2025; 2:00 p.m., ESPN+		Montana State	L 60–74	9–15 (4–9)	19 – Jordan	8 – Carlson	4 – Spink	Reed Gym (877); Pocatello, ID
February 20, 2025; 8:00 p.m., ESPN+		at Portland State	W 89–80 ^{2OT}	10–15 (5–9)	28 – Jordan	13 – Spink	10 – Covello	Viking Pavilion (329); Portland, OR
February 22, 2025; 3:00 p.m., ESPN+		at Sacramento State	W 50–41	11–15 (6–9)	12 – Spink	8 – 2 tied	4 – Spink	Hornets Nest (407); Sacramento, CA
February 27, 2025; 7:00 p.m., ESPN+		Idaho; Battle of the Domes	W 75–69	12–15 (7–9)	16 – Jordan	10 – Carlson	5 – Spink	Reed Gym (1,036); Pocatello, ID
March 1, 2025; 2:00 p.m., ESPN+		Eastern Washington	W 75–60	13–15 (8–9)	21 – Jordan	7 – Spink	3 – 2 tied	Reed Gym (981); Pocatello, ID
March 3, 2025; 6:00 p.m., ESPN+		at Northern Arizona	L 71–83	13–16 (8–10)	19 – Covello	10 – Spink	6 – Spink	Findlay Toyota Court (505); Flagstaff, AZ
Big Sky tournament
March 10, 2025; 12:00 p.m., ESPN+	(5)	vs. (4) Weber State; Quarterfinals	W 62–42	14–16	16 – Carlson	8 – Spink	5 – Covello	Idaho Central Arena; Boise, ID
March 11, 2025; 12:00 p.m., ESPN+	(5)	vs. (1) Montana State; Semifinals	L 42–75	14–17	14 – Jordan	10 – Carlson	6 – Spink	Idaho Central Arena; Boise, ID
*Non-conference game. ^{#}Rankings from AP poll. (#) Tournament seedings in parentheses. All times are in Mountain.
