= 2024–25 Northern Colorado Bears women's basketball team =

American college basketball season

2024–25 Northern Colorado Bears women's basketball
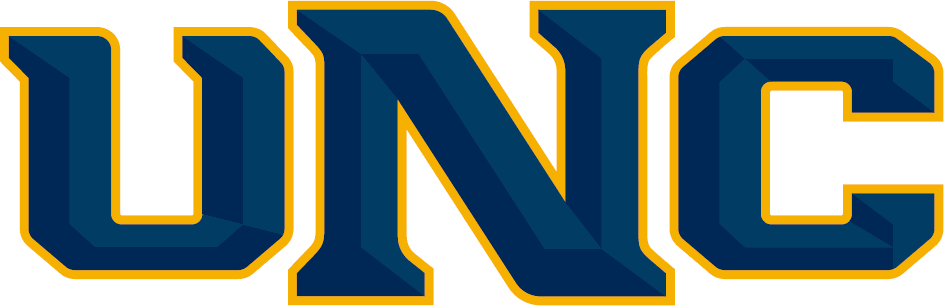
- Conference: Big Sky Conference
- Record: 14–17 (6–12 Big Sky)
- Head coach: Kristen Mattio (4th season)
- Associate head coach: Camille Perkins
- Assistant coaches: Desiree Jackson; Jerad Stottlemyre; Katie Mayes; Madison Hagen
- Home arena: Bank of Colorado Arena

2024–25 Big Sky women's basketball standings
	Conf.				Overall
Team	W		L	PCT	W		L	PCT
Montana State †	17	–	1	.944	30	–	4	.882
Northern Arizona	16	–	2	.889	27	–	8	.771
Idaho	10	–	8	.556	18	–	12	.600
Weber State	10	–	8	.556	13	–	16	.448
Idaho State	8	–	10	.444	14	–	17	.452
Montana	8	–	10	.444	14	–	18	.438
Eastern Washington	7	–	11	.389	11	–	20	.355
Sacramento State	7	–	11	.389	15	–	18	.455
Northern Colorado	6	–	12	.333	14	–	17	.452
Portland State	1	–	17	.056	4	–	24	.143
† 2025 Big Sky tournament winner

The 2024–25 Northern Colorado Bears women's basketball team represented the University of Northern Colorado during the 2024–25 NCAA Division I women's basketball season. The Bears, led by fourth-year head coach Kristen Mattio, played their home games at the Bank of Colorado Arena in Greeley, Colorado as members of the Big Sky Conference.

== Previous season ==
The Bears finished the 2023–24 season 15–16, 10–8 in Big Sky play, to finish in a tie for fourth place. They were defeated by Montana State in the quarterfinals of the Big Sky tournament. They received an at-large bid to the WNIT, where they fell to UTSA in the first round.

== Roster ==
2024–25 Northern Colorado Bears women's basketball team
Players
Coaches

Pos.	#	Name	Height	Year	Previous school	Hometown
G	0	Olivia Loomis-Goltl	5 ft 10 in (1.78 m)	Fr	Bridgeport High School	Bridgeport, NE
G	1	Julia Riley	6 ft 1 in (1.85 m)	Jr	Cal State Bakersfield	Granite Bay, CA
G	3	London Gamble	5 ft 8 in (1.73 m)	Jr	Siena	Westlake Village, CA
F	4	Claire Fraser	6 ft 0 in (1.83 m)	Fr	Brisbane State High School	Brisbane, Australia
G	5	Neenah George	5 ft 8 in (1.73 m)	Fr	Legion Prep	Dallas, TX
F	10	Louise Dykstra	6 ft 2 in (1.88 m)	Fr	Sir Winston Churchill Secondary School	Vancouver, BC
F	11	Lilah Moore	5 ft 10 in (1.78 m)	Jr	Pinnacle High School	Phoenix, AZ
C	12	April Rummery-Lamb	6 ft 3 in (1.91 m)	Sr	Newberry College	Darwin, Australia
C	13	Diana Saleh	6 ft 2 in (1.88 m)	GS	Lipscomb	Dearborn, MI
G	15	Gabi Fields	5 ft 5 in (1.65 m)	Jr	Brownfield High School	Brownfield, TX
F	22	Aniah Hall	6 ft 3 in (1.91 m)	Jr	Temple High School	Temple, TX
G	23	Silvia Nativi	6 ft 0 in (1.83 m)	Sr	Louisiana Tech	Marina di Grosseto, Italy
F	24	Tatum West	6 ft 2 in (1.88 m)	So	Crandall High School	Combine, TX
F	25	Ella Van Weelden	6 ft 2 in (1.88 m)	RS Jr	Valparaiso	Cedar Rapids, IA

Head coach

- Kristen Mattio (Evangel)

Assistant coach(es)

- Camille Perkins (Angelo State)
- Desiree Jackson (Southern Utah)
- Jerad Stottlemyre (Washington)
- Katie Mayes (Montana State)
- Madison Hagen (Evergreen State)

Legend

- (C) Team captain
- (S) Suspended
- (I) Ineligible
- (W) Walk-on
- Injured
- Current redshirt

Roster
Last update: January 14, 2025

== Schedule and results ==
Date time, TV	Rank^{#}	Opponent^{#}	Result	Record	High points	High rebounds	High assists	Site (attendance) city, state
Exhibition
October 30, 2024*; 6:00 p.m.		Fort Lewis	W 84–46	-	–	–	–	Bank of Colorado Arena; Greeley, CO
Non-conference regular season
November 4, 2024*; 5:30 p.m., ESPN+		Concordia (NE)	W 66–64	1–0	18 – Gamble	7 – Hall	3 – Nativi	Bank of Colorado Arena (774); Greeley, CO
November 7, 2024*; 7:00 p.m., ESPN+		at Colorado	L 66–81	1–1	13 – Nativi	8 – West	6 – Fields	CU Events Center (2,161); Boulder, CO
November 11, 2024*; 6:00 p.m., ESPN+		Air Force	L 66–73	1–2	17 – Hall	13 – Hall	5 – Fields	Bank of Colorado Arena (605); Greeley, CO
November 17, 2024*; 2:00 p.m., ESPN+		Utah State	W 85–57	2–2	19 – Hall	14 – West	5 – 2 tied	Bank of Colorado Arena (581); Greeley, CO
November 23, 2024*; 3:00 p.m., ESPN+		at BYU	W 67–60 ^{OT}	3–2	17 – Fields	14 – West	6 – Fields	Marriott Center (1,158); Provo, UT
November 29, 2024*; 6:00 p.m., ESPN+		Central Christian	W 140–26	4–2	17 – Riley	9 – West	7 – Fields	Bank of Colorado Arena (566); Greeley, CO
November 30, 2024*; 6:00 p.m., ESPN+		Tabor	W 93–46	5–2	23 – West	6 – 3 tied	6 – Fields	Bank of Colorado Arena (608); Greeley, CO
December 4, 2024*; 6:00 p.m., SLN		at St. Thomas; Big Sky–Summit League Challenge	W 62–54	6–2	17 – West	6 – 2 tied	6 – Nativi	Schoenecker Arena (327); St. Paul, MN
December 7, 2024*; 2:00 p.m., ESPN+		North Dakota; Big Sky–Summit League Challenge	W 65–47	7–2	12 – 2 tied	6 – Hall	4 – Fields	Bank of Colorado Arena (519); Greeley, CO
December 13, 2024*; 6:00 p.m., SLN		at Denver	L 53–64	7–3	13 – 2 tied	12 – West	1 – 3 tied	Hamilton Gymnasium (318); Denver, CO
December 21, 2024*; 12:00 p.m., ESPN+		at Lamar	L 43–60	7–4	12 – West	8 – Fields	2 – West	Neches Arena (750); Beaumont, TX
Big Sky regular season
January 2, 2025; 6:00 p.m., ESPN+		at Weber State	L 52–65	7–5 (0–1)	17 – West	8 – 2 tied	3 – West	Dee Events Center (359); Ogden, UT
January 4, 2025; 2:00 p.m., ESPN+		at Idaho State	L 50–58	7–6 (0–2)	11 – Gamble	13 – Hall	2 – 2 tied	Reed Gym; Pocatello, ID
January 9, 2025; 6:00 p.m., ESPN+		Montana State	L 57–68	7–7 (0–3)	24 – Gamble	9 – Hall	4 – West	Bank of Colorado Arena (691); Greeley, CO
January 11, 2025; 2:00 p.m., ESPN+		Montana	W 57–49	8–7 (1–3)	18 – Gamble	9 – Hall	3 – 2 tied	Bank of Colorado Arena (793); Greeley, CO
January 16, 2025; 8:00 p.m., ESPN+		at Portland State	L 52–58	8–8 (1–4)	12 – 2 tied	6 – Fields	4 – Fields	Viking Pavilion (471); Portland, OR
January 18, 2025; 3:00 p.m., ESPN+		at Sacramento State	L 48–51	8–9 (1–5)	10 – Gamble	6 – 2 tied	4 – Fields	Hornets Nest (668); Sacramento, CA
January 23, 2025; 6:00 p.m., ESPN+		Idaho	L 57–68	8–10 (1–6)	14 – West	10 – West	3 – 2 tied	Bank of Colorado Arena (616); Greeley, CO
January 25, 2025; 2:00 p.m., ESPN+		Eastern Washington	W 66–57	9–10 (2–6)	12 – Van Weelden	6 – 3 tied	4 – Fields	Bank of Colorado Arena (687); Greeley, CO
February 1, 2025; 2:00 p.m., ESPN+		at Northern Arizona	L 52–68	9–11 (2–7)	10 – 2 tied	4 – 4 tied	2 – 2 tied	Findlay Toyota Court (568); Flagstaff, AZ
February 3, 2025; 6:00 p.m., ESPN+		Idaho State	W 59–51	10–11 (3–7)	16 – Gamble	10 – Hall	3 – Nativi	Bank of Colorado Arena (601); Greeley, CO
February 6, 2025; 7:00 p.m., ESPN+		at Montana	L 64–70	10–12 (3–8)	13 – 2 tied	5 – Hall	5 – Nativi	Dahlberg Arena (2,327); Missoula, MT
February 8, 2025; 2:00 p.m., ESPN+		at Montana State	L 44–65	10–13 (3–9)	11 – West	11 – West	2 – Nativi	Worthington Arena (2,397); Bozeman, MT
February 13, 2025; 12:00 p.m., ESPN+		Sacramento State	W 85–72	11–13 (4–9)	27 – Gamble	7 – Hall	5 – 2 tied	Bank of Colorado Arena (2,821); Greeley, CO
February 15, 2025; 2:00 p.m., ESPN+		Portland State	W 68–50	12–13 (5–9)	21 – Gamble	8 – Riley	4 – Fields	Bank of Colorado Arena (761); Greeley, CO
February 20, 2025; 7:00 p.m., ESPN+		at Eastern Washington	W 50–46	13–13 (6–9)	11 – Hall	7 – West	6 – Fields	Reese Court (561); Cheney, WA
February 22, 2025; 3:00 p.m., ESPN+		at Idaho	L 59–77	13–14 (6–10)	12 – Hall	6 – Hall	2 – 2 tied	ICCU Arena (1,314); Moscow, ID
March 1, 2025; 6:00 p.m., ESPN+		Northern Arizona	L 70–80	13–15 (6–11)	13 – Nativi	12 – West	3 – 2 tied	Bank of Colorado Arena (855); Greeley, CO
March 3, 2025; 6:00 p.m., ESPN+		Weber State	L 67–68 ^{OT}	13–16 (6–12)	23 – Gamble	11 – Hall	5 – West	Bank of Colorado Arena (888); Greeley, CO
Big Sky tournament
March 8, 2025; 12:00 pm, ESPN+	(9)	vs. (10) Portland State; First round	W 53–50	14–16	12 – Hall	5 – Hall	3 – 2 tied	Idaho Central Arena; Boise, ID
March 9, 2025; 12:00 pm, ESPN+	(9)	vs. (1) Montana State; Quarterfinals	L 60–92	14–17	20 – Gamble	7 – West	4 – Fields	Idaho Central Arena; Boise, ID
*Non-conference game. ^{#}Rankings from AP poll. (#) Tournament seedings in parentheses. All times are in Mountain.
