= 2024–25 Eastern Washington Eagles women's basketball team =

American college basketball season

2024–25 Eastern Washington Eagles women's basketball
- Conference: Big Sky Conference
- Record: 11–20 (7–11 Big Sky)
- Head coach: Joddie Gleason (4th season)
- Associate head coach: Skip Gleason
- Assistant coaches: Brandon Morrison; Angela Song; Jordan Loera
- Home arena: Reese Court

2024–25 Big Sky women's basketball standings
	Conf.				Overall
Team	W		L	PCT	W		L	PCT
Montana State †	17	–	1	.944	30	–	4	.882
Northern Arizona	16	–	2	.889	27	–	8	.771
Idaho	10	–	8	.556	18	–	12	.600
Weber State	10	–	8	.556	13	–	16	.448
Idaho State	8	–	10	.444	14	–	17	.452
Montana	8	–	10	.444	14	–	18	.438
Eastern Washington	7	–	11	.389	11	–	20	.355
Sacramento State	7	–	11	.389	15	–	18	.455
Northern Colorado	6	–	12	.333	14	–	17	.452
Portland State	1	–	17	.056	4	–	24	.143
† 2025 Big Sky tournament winner

The 2024–25 Eastern Washington Eagles women's basketball team represented Eastern Washington University during the 2024–25 NCAA Division I women's basketball season. The Eagles, led by fourth-year head coach Joddie Gleason, played their home games at Reese Court in Cheney, Washington as members of the Big Sky Conference.

== Previous season ==
The Eagles finished the 2023–24 season 29–6, 16–2 in Big Sky play to finish as Big Sky regular season champions. They defeated Weber State, Montana State, and Northern Arizona to win the Big Sky tournament championship, earning just their second NCAA tournament appearance, and their first since 1987. They received the #14 seed in the Albany Regional 1, where they would fall to #3 region seed Oregon State in the first round.

== Roster ==
2024–25 Eastern Washington Eagles women's basketball team
Players
Coaches

Pos.	#	Name	Height	Year	Previous school	Hometown
G	1	Alexis Pettis	5 ft 5 in (1.65 m)	Sr	Palisades Charter High School	Gardena, California
G	2	Ella Gallatin	5 ft 10 in (1.78 m)	Jr	Snohomish High School	Snohomish, Washington
G	3	Ellie Boni	5 ft 9 in (1.75 m)	GS	San Jose State	Spokane Valley, Washington
G	4	Rachel Harvey	5 ft 7 in (1.7 m)	GS	Cal State Northridge	San Francisco, California
G	5	Breeje Schuler	5 ft 10 in (1.78 m)	Jr	St Peter's School, Cambridge	Te Aroha, New Zealand
PF	10	Jaecy Eggers	6 ft 2 in (1.88 m)	Fr	Woodinville High School	Woodinville, Washington
G	11	Peyton Howard	5 ft 10 in (1.78 m)	GS	Seattle	Spokane Valley, Washington
PF	12	Paris Kirk	6 ft 2 in (1.88 m)	Jr	Robert Morris	Kelowna, British Columbia
G	13	Valérie Cassidy-De Falco	5 ft 5 in (1.65 m)	Fr	Nottingham Girls' High School	Nottingham, England
PF	14	Cori Wilcox	6 ft 2 in (1.88 m)	RS So	Lake Stevens High School	Lake Stevens, Washington
G	21	Léa-line Romain	5 ft 10 in (1.78 m)	Fr	Santa Margarita Catholic High School	Paris, France
SF	22	Kourtney Grossman	6 ft 0 in (1.83 m)	Fr	Billings West High School	Billings, Montana
G	23	Emily McElmurry	5 ft 9 in (1.75 m)	Fr	Sentinel High School	Missoula, Montana
SF	41	Addison Hall	5 ft 10 in (1.78 m)	Jr	Winlock Senior High School	Winlock, Washington
PF	44	Camille Jentzsch	6 ft 3 in (1.91 m)	RS So	Lake Stevens High School	Lake Stevens, Washington
PF	52	Bella Hays	6 ft 4 in (1.93 m)	RS So	Wasilla High School	Wasilla, Alaska

Head coach

- Joddie Gleason (Chico State)

Assistant coach(es)

- Skip Gleason (Chico State)
- Brandon Morrison (UNLV)
- Angela Song (Beijing Sport)
- Jordan Loera (Oregon)

Legend

- (C) Team captain
- (S) Suspended
- (I) Ineligible
- (W) Walk-on
- Injured
- Current redshirt

Roster
Last update: January 12, 2025

== Schedule and results ==
Date time, TV	Rank^{#}	Opponent^{#}	Result	Record	High points	High rebounds	High assists	Site (attendance) city, state
Exhibition
October 27, 2024*; 2:00 pm		Eastern Oregon	W 81–61	–	14 – Howard	12 – Eggers	–	Reese Court; Cheney, WA
Non-conference regular season
November 4, 2024*; 4:00 pm, ESPN+		at Washington State	L 82–83 ^{OT}	0–1	25 – Howard	13 – Kirk	3 – Tied	Beasley Coliseum (906); Pullman, WA
November 9, 2024*; 7:00 pm, ESPN+		Walla Walla	W 81–33	1–1	18 – Gallatin	8 – Eggers	6 – Howard	Reese Court (453); Cheney, WA
November 14, 2024*; 6:00 pm, B1G+		at Washington	L 59–83	1–2	20 – Howard	7 – Hays	2 – Gallatin	Alaska Airlines Arena (1,925); Seattle, WA
November 17, 2024*; 2:00 pm, ESPN+		Portland	L 62–74	1–3	16 – Howard	7 – Grossman	3 – Boni	Reese Court (1,090); Cheney, WA
November 22, 2024*; 3:30 pm		vs. Saint Mary's; Bank of Hawai'i Classic	L 57–59	1–4	15 – Howard	6 – Schuler	3 – Tied	Stan Sheriff Center (2,694); Honolulu, HI
November 24, 2024*; 4:30 pm, ESPN+		at Hawai'i; Bank of Hawai'i Classic	L 55–67	1–5	14 – Howard	6 – Tied	6 – Howard	Stan Sheriff Center (1,744); Honolulu, HI
November 27, 2024*; 6:00 pm, ESPN+		Cal State Bakersfield	W 67–58	2–5	21 – Howard	11 – Gallatin	5 – Howard	Reese Court (503); Cheney, WA
December 4, 2024*; 5:00 pm, SLN		at South Dakota State; Big Sky-Summit League Challenge	L 58–81	2–6	15 – Howard	14 – Grossman	4 – Gallatin	First Bank and Trust Arena (2,124); Brookings, SD
December 7, 2024*; 2:00 pm, ESPN+		North Dakota State; Big Sky-Summit League Challenge	L 47–74	2–7	18 – Howard	7 – Grossman	1 – Tied	Reese Court (536); Cheney, WA
December 14, 2024*; 2:00 pm, SWX/ESPN+		at Gonzaga	L 50–79	2–8	15 – Howard	7 – Grossman	1 – Tied	McCarthey Athletic Center (5,243); Spokane, WA
December 16, 2024*; 6:00 pm, ESPN+		Warner Pacific	W 98–45	3–8	16 – McElmurry	9 – Grossman	7 – Harvey	Reese Court (550); Cheney, WA
December 20, 2024*; 6:00 pm, ESPN+		UC Santa Barbara	W 54–46	4–8	17 – Pettis	17 – Grossman	4 – Howard	Reese Court (496); Cheney, WA
Big Sky regular season
January 2, 2025; 6:00 pm, ESPN+		at Montana	L 70–78	4–9 (0–1)	22 – Gallatin	14 – Grossman	7 – Howard	Dahlberg Arena (2,304); Missoula, MT
January 4, 2025; 1:00 pm, ESPN+		at Montana State	L 54–66	4–10 (0–2)	13 – Grossman	16 – Grossman	6 – Howard	Worthington Arena (1,517); Bozeman, MT
January 9, 2025; 6:00 pm, ESPN+		Portland State	W 78–49	5–10 (1–2)	13 – Eggers	9 – Grossman	4 – Tied	Reese Court (575); Cheney, WA
January 11, 2025; 2:00 pm, ESPN+		Sacramento State	W 89–80	6–10 (2–2)	23 – Gallatin	11 – Grossman	7 – Howard	Reese Court (642); Cheney, WA
January 18, 2025; 1:00 pm, ESPN+		at Idaho	L 57–67	6–11 (2–3)	14 – Gallatin	12 – Grossman	2 – Gallatin	ICCU Arena (2,246); Moscow, ID
January 20, 2025; 6:00 pm, ESPN+		Montana State	L 56–58	6–12 (2–4)	18 – Grossman	19 – Grossman	3 – Tied	Reese Court (655); Cheney, WA
January 23, 2025; 5:00 pm, ESPN+		at Northern Arizona	L 63–75	6–13 (2–5)	16 – Eggers	13 – Grossman	5 – Howard	Findlay Toyota Court (513); Flagstaff, AZ
January 25, 2025; 1:00 pm, ESPN+		at Northern Colorado	L 57–66	6–14 (2–6)	17 – Grossman	17 – Grossman	3 – Harvey	Bank of Colorado Arena (687); Greeley, CO
January 30, 2025; 11:00 am, ESPN+		Idaho State	W 78–71 ^{OT}	7–14 (3–6)	17 – Howard	11 – Grossman	4 – Howard	Reese Court (2,100); Cheney, WA
February 1, 2025; 2:00 pm, ESPN+		Weber State	L 48–62	7–15 (3–7)	13 – Gallatin	15 – Grossman	3 – Tied	Reese Court (765); Cheney, WA
February 6, 2025; 6:30 pm, ESPN+		at Sacramento State	W 68–53	8–15 (4–7)	17 – Tied	8 – Eggers	4 – Tied	Hornets Nest (732); Sacramento, CA
February 8, 2025; 2:00 pm, ESPN+		at Portland State	W 65–58	9–15 (5–7)	17 – Howard	12 – Grossman	4 – Gallatin	Viking Pavilion (514); Portland, OR
February 15, 2025; 1:00 pm, ESPN+		Idaho	W 63–60	10–15 (6–7)	19 – Howard	9 – Grossman	3 – Tied	Reese Court (930); Cheney, WA
February 20, 2025; 6:00 pm, ESPN+		Northern Colorado	L 46–50	10–16 (6–8)	13 – Howard	16 – Grossman	5 – Harvey	Reese Court (561); Cheney, WA
February 22, 2025; 2:00 pm, ESPN+		Northern Arizona	L 77–88	10–17 (6–9)	30 – Howard	8 – Grossman	5 – Tied	Reese Court (745); Cheney, WA
February 27, 2025; 5:00 pm, ESPN+		at Weber State	L 65–67	10–18 (6–10)	18 – Pettis	15 – Grossman	3 – Tied	Dee Events Center (296); Ogden, UT
March 1, 2025; 1:00 pm, ESPN+		at Idaho State	L 60–75	10–19 (6–11)	13 – Pettis	10 – Grossman	4 – Harvey	Reed Gym (981); Pocatello, ID
March 3, 2025; 6:00 pm, ESPN+		Montana	W 80–77	11–19 (7–11)	21 – Pettis	11 – Grossman	3 – Howard	Reese Court (781); Cheney, WA
Big Sky tournament
March 8, 2025; 1:30 pm, ESPN+	(7)	vs. (8) Sacramento State; First round	L 67–71	11–20	14 – Grossman	12 – Grossman	3 – Gallatin	Idaho Central Arena; Boise, ID
*Non-conference game. ^{#}Rankings from AP Poll. (#) Tournament seedings in parentheses. All times are in Pacific.
