= 2024–25 Montana Lady Griz basketball team =

American college basketball season

2024–25 Montana Lady Griz basketball
- Conference: Big Sky Conference
- Record: 14–18 (8–10 Big Sky)
- Head coach: Brian Holsinger (4th season; first 23 games); Nate Harris (interim, rest of season)
- Assistant coaches: Lindsay Woolley; Emma List; Kayla Anderson
- Home arena: Dahlberg Arena

2024–25 Big Sky women's basketball standings
	Conf.				Overall
Team	W		L	PCT	W		L	PCT
Montana State †	17	–	1	.944	30	–	4	.882
Northern Arizona	16	–	2	.889	27	–	8	.771
Idaho	10	–	8	.556	18	–	12	.600
Weber State	10	–	8	.556	13	–	16	.448
Idaho State	8	–	10	.444	14	–	17	.452
Montana	8	–	10	.444	14	–	18	.438
Eastern Washington	7	–	11	.389	11	–	20	.355
Sacramento State	7	–	11	.389	15	–	18	.455
Northern Colorado	6	–	12	.333	14	–	17	.452
Portland State	1	–	17	.056	4	–	24	.143
† 2025 Big Sky tournament winner

The 2024–25 Montana Lady Griz basketball team represented the University of Montana during the 2024–25 NCAA Division I women's basketball season. The Lady Griz, led by fourth-year head coach Brian Holsinger, played their home games at Dahlberg Arena in Missoula, Montana as members of the Big Sky Conference.

== Previous season ==
The Lady Griz finished the 2023–24 season 23–10, 13–5 in Big Sky play to finish in third place. They defeated Idaho, before falling to Northern Arizona in the semifinals of the Big Sky tournament. They received an at-large bid to the WNIT, where they would defeat Boise State in the first round, before falling to North Dakota State in the second round.

== Roster ==
2024–25 Montana Lady Griz women's basketball team
Players
Coaches

Pos.	#	Name	Height	Year	Previous school	Hometown
G	1	Macy Donarski	5 ft 8 in (1.73 m)	RS Fr	Aquinas High School	La Crosse, Wisconsin
G	2	Mack Konig	5 ft 9 in (1.75 m)	Jr	King's Christian Collegiate	Milton, Ontario
G	3	Draya Wacker	5 ft 8 in (1.73 m)	RS Fr	Melstone High School	Melstone, Montana
G	5	Tyler McCliment-Call	6 ft 0 in (1.83 m)	GS	Stephen F. Austin	Spokane, Washington
G	10	Avery Waddington	6 ft 3 in (1.91 m)	Fr	Lake City High School	Coeur d'Alene, Idaho
G	11	Aby Shubert	5 ft 8 in (1.73 m)	So	Xavier	Kasson, Minnesota
G	12	Chloe Larsen	5 ft 10 in (1.78 m)	Fr	Hellgate High School	Missoula, Montana
F	13	Izabella Zingaro	6 ft 4 in (1.93 m)	RS Jr	Iowa State	Bolton, Ontario
G	14	Lauren Dick	5 ft 10 in (1.78 m)	Jr	Hellgate High School	Missoula, Montana
C	15	Imogen Greenslade	6 ft 4 in (1.93 m)	RS Sr	Arizona State	Sydney, Australia
G	23	MJ Bruno	5 ft 11 in (1.8 m)	Sr	Portland	Spokane, Washington
G	33	Adria Lincoln	6 ft 1 in (1.85 m)	So	Monroe High School	Monroe, Washington
F	34	Alex Pirog	6 ft 3 in (1.91 m)	Jr	Highlands Ranch High School	Highlands Ranch, Colorado
F	40	Dani Bartsch	6 ft 2 in (1.88 m)	Sr	Capital High School	Helena, Montana

Head coach

- Brian Holsinger (Western Washington)
- Nate Harris (Montana Tech)

Assistant coach(es)

- Lindsay Woolley (Montana)
- Emma List (Florida Gulf Coast)
- Kayla Anderson (Utah Valley)

Legend

- (C) Team captain
- (S) Suspended
- (I) Ineligible
- (W) Walk-on
- Injured
- Current redshirt

Roster
Last update: January 15, 2025

== Schedule and results ==
Date time, TV	Rank^{#}	Opponent^{#}	Result	Record	High points	High rebounds	High assists	Site (attendance) city, state
Non-conference regular season
November 5, 2024*; 7:00 pm, ESPN+		at Gonzaga	L 69–82	0–1	13 – Waddington	5 – Waddington	7 – Konig	McCarthey Athletic Center (4,952); Spokane, WA
November 10, 2024*; 3:00 pm		Southeastern	W 72–60	1–1	19 – Bartsch	9 – Pirog	10 – Konig	Dahlberg Arena (1,890); Missoula, MT
November 14, 2024*; 8:00 pm, ESPN+		Cal Poly	L 55–65	1–2	13 – Pirog	6 – Pirog	5 – Konig	Dahlberg Arena (1,863); Missoula, MT
November 17, 2024*; 2:00 pm, ESPN+		Washington	W 82–68	2–2	24 – Konig	10 – Bartsch	4 – Konig	Dahlberg Arena (2,145); Missoula, MT
November 21, 2024*; 6:00 pm, SLN		at North Dakota	W 71–59	3–2	15 – Bartsch	8 – Bartsch	5 – Konig	Betty Engelstad Sioux Center (1,548); Grand Forks, ND
November 24, 2024*; 1:00 pm, B1G+		at Minnesota	L 45–84	3–3	12 – Konig	8 – McCliment-Call	4 – Bruno	Williams Arena (3,961); Minneapolis, MN
November 26, 2024*; 7:00 pm, ESPN+		Evergreen State	W 107–56	4–3	27 – McCliment-Call	13 – Pirog	4 – Tied	Dahlberg Arena (1,756); Missoula, MT
December 4, 2024*; 6:00 pm, SLN		at North Dakota State; Big Sky-Summit League Challenge	L 74–83	4–4	25 – Zingaro	8 – Zingaro	5 – Konig	Scheels Center (624); Fargo, ND
December 7, 2024*; 2:00 pm, ESPN+		South Dakota State; Big Sky-Summit League Challenge	L 70–78	4–5	19 – Bartsch	4 – Tied	11 – Konig	Dahlberg Arena (2,031); Missoula, MT
December 19, 2024*; 10:00 am, Baller TV		vs. No. 15 Michigan State; West Palm Beach Classic	L 38–69	4–6	7 – Lincoln	6 – Waddington	2 – Tied	Rubin Arena (173); West Palm Beach, FL
December 20, 2024*; 10:00 am, Baller TV		vs. Tulsa; West Palm Beach Classic	L 58–68	4–7	15 – Konig	9 – Waddington	5 – Konig	Rubin Arena (124); West Palm Beach, FL
Big Sky regular season
January 2, 2025; 7:00 pm, ESPN+		Eastern Washington	W 78–70	5–7 (1–0)	15 – Bruno	10 – Waddington	8 – Bartsch	Dahlberg Arena (2,304); Missoula, MT
January 4, 2025; 2:00 pm, ESPN+		Idaho	L 50–63	5–8 (1–1)	15 – Waddington	9 – Waddington	6 – Konig	Dahlberg Arena (2,268); Missoula, MT
January 9, 2025; 6:00 pm, ESPN+		at Northern Arizona	L 46–65	5–9 (1–2)	9 – Bruno	9 – Bartsch	4 – Bartsch	Findlay Toyota Court (347); Flagstaff, AZ
January 11, 2025; 2:00 pm, ESPN+		at Northern Colorado	L 49–57	5–10 (1–3)	12 – Shubert	5 – Tied	7 – Konig	Bank of Colorado Arena (793); Greeley, CO
January 16, 2025; 7:00 pm, ESPN+		Weber State	W 74–70	6–10 (2–3)	18 – McCliment-Call	10 – Bartsch	7 – Donarski	Dahlberg Arena (2,107); Missoula, MT
January 18, 2025; 2:00 pm, ESPN+/SWX		Idaho State	W 81–60	7–10 (3–3)	14 – Shubert	8 – Bartsch	4 – Tied	Dahlberg Arena (2,638); Missoula, MT
January 20, 2025; 3:00 pm, ESPN+		at Idaho	L 57–70	7–11 (3–4)	10 – Konig	10 – Waddington	4 – Bruno	ICCU Arena (1,209); Moscow, ID
January 25, 2025; 2:00 pm, ESPN+/Scripps Sports		Montana State	L 66–67	7–12 (3–5)	21 – Waddington	16 – Bartsch	6 – Konig	Dahlberg Arena (3,432); Missoula, MT
January 30, 2025; 8:00 pm, ESPN+		at Portland State	W 73–61	8–12 (4–5)	17 – Tied	10 – Bartsch	7 – Bartsch	Viking Pavilion (486); Portland, OR
February 1, 2025; 3:00 pm, ESPN+		at Sacramento State	W 69–63	9–12 (5–5)	19 – McCliment-Call	12 – Bartsch	5 – Konig	Hornets Nest (543); Sacramento, CA
February 6, 2025; 7:00 pm, ESPN+		Northern Colorado	W 70–64	10–12 (6–5)	21 – Zingaro	13 – Waddington	5 – Tied	Dahlberg Arena (2,327); Missoula, MT
February 8, 2025; 2:00 pm, ESPN+		Northern Arizona	L 76–92	10–13 (6–6)	17 – Tied	6 – Waddington	6 – Waddington	Dahlberg Arena (2,580); Missoula, MT
February 13, 2025; 7:00 pm, ESPN+		at Idaho State	L 46–66	10–14 (6–7)	17 – Konig	6 – Tied	4 – Konig	Reed Gym (752); Pocatello, ID
February 15, 2025; 2:00 pm, ESPN+		at Weber State	L 69–73	10–15 (6–8)	14 – Tied	9 – Bartsch	4 – Konig	Dee Events Center (768); Ogden, UT
February 22, 2025; 2:00 pm, ESPN+/Scripps Sports		at Montana State	L 66–98	10–16 (6–9)	20 – Waddington	14 – Bartsch	4 – Konig	Worthington Arena (4,127); Bozeman, MT
February 27, 2025; 7:00 pm, ESPN+		Sacramento State	W 71–63	11–16 (7–9)	16 – Konig	7 – Bartsch	8 – Konig	Dahlberg Arena (3,008); Missoula, MT
March 1, 2025; 2:00 pm, ESPN+		Portland State	W 74–61	12–16 (8–9)	17 – Konig	8 – Bartsch	7 – Konig	Dahlberg Arena (2,413); Missoula, MT
March 3, 2025; 7:00 pm, ESPN+		at Eastern Washington	L 77–80	12–17 (8–10)	16 – Konig	6 – Konig	11 – Konig	Reese Court (781); Cheney, WA
Big Sky tournament
March 10, 2025; 2:30 pm, ESPN+	(6)	vs. (3) Idaho; Quarterfinals	W 65–54	13–17	20 – Konig	18 – McCliment-Call	6 – Konig	Idaho Central Arena (425); Boise, ID
March 11, 2025; 2:30 pm, ESPN+	(6)	vs. (2) Northern Arizona; Semifinals	W 71–67	14–17	29 – Konig	11 – Waddington	5 – Konig	Idaho Central Arena (621); Boise, ID
March 12, 2025; 3:00 pm, ESPNU	(6)	vs. (1) Montana State; Championship	L 57–58	14–18	15 – Waddington	8 – Waddington	8 – Konig	Idaho Central Arena (779); Boise, ID
*Non-conference game. ^{#}Rankings from AP Poll. (#) Tournament seedings in parentheses. All times are in Mountain.
