= 2024–25 Sacramento State Hornets women's basketball team =

American college basketball season

2024–25 Sacramento State Hornets women's basketball
- Conference: Big Sky Conference
- Record: 15–18 (7–11 Big Sky)
- Head coach: Aaron Kallhoff (2nd season)
- Associate head coach: De'Audra Brown
- Assistant coaches: Jodi Page; Asha Thomas
- Home arena: Hornets Nest

2024–25 Big Sky women's basketball standings
	Conf.				Overall
Team	W		L	PCT	W		L	PCT
Montana State †	17	–	1	.944	30	–	4	.882
Northern Arizona	16	–	2	.889	27	–	8	.771
Idaho	10	–	8	.556	18	–	12	.600
Weber State	10	–	8	.556	13	–	16	.448
Idaho State	8	–	10	.444	14	–	17	.452
Montana	8	–	10	.444	14	–	18	.438
Eastern Washington	7	–	11	.389	11	–	20	.355
Sacramento State	7	–	11	.389	15	–	18	.455
Northern Colorado	6	–	12	.333	14	–	17	.452
Portland State	1	–	17	.056	4	–	24	.143
† 2025 Big Sky tournament winner

The 2024–25 Sacramento State Hornets women's basketball team represented California State University, Sacramento during the 2024–25 NCAA Division I women's basketball season. The Hornets, led by second-year head coach Aaron Kallhoff, played their home games at the Hornets Nest in Sacramento, California as members of the Big Sky Conference.

The Hornets finished the season 15–18, 7–11 in Big Sky play, to finish in a tie for seventh place. They beat Eastern Washington in the first round of the Big Sky tournament before falling to Northern Arizona in the quarterfinals.

== Previous season ==
The Hornets finished the 2023–24 season 6–25, 4–14 in Big Sky play, to finish in a tie for eighth place. They defeated Idaho State before falling to Northern Arizona in the quarterfinals of the Big Sky tournament.

== Roster ==
2024–25 Sacramento State Hornets women's basketball team
Players
Coaches

Pos.	#	Name	Height	Year	Previous school	Hometown
G	0	Jeniece Harmon	5 ft 5 in (1.65 m)	Sr	Hawaii–Hilo	Fresno, CA
G	1	Benthe Versteeg	5 ft 9 in (1.75 m)	RS Jr	Landslake Lions	Amsterdam-Zuid, Netherlands
G	2	Jemma Amoore	5 ft 4 in (1.63 m)	Fr	Ballarat Miners	Ballarat, Australia
G/F	3	Brooklyn Taylor	6 ft 1 in (1.85 m)	Fr	Long Beach Poly High School	Inglewood, CA
C	4	Paula Haw	6 ft 5 in (1.96 m)	RS Fr	Deutschhaus Gymnasium	Munich, Germany
G	5	Kennadi Archibald	5 ft 10 in (1.78 m)	Jr	Collin College	Dallas, TX
G/F	10	Madison Butcher	5 ft 10 in (1.78 m)	RS So	Del Oro High School	Loomis, CA
G	11	Rubi Gray	5 ft 10 in (1.78 m)	Fr	BA Centre of Excellence	Devonport, Australia
G	12	Sofia Alonso	5 ft 8 in (1.73 m)	RS Fr	IES Emilio Ferrari	Valladolid, Spain
F	20	Katie Peneueta	6 ft 3 in (1.91 m)	Sr	NC State	Vancouver, WA
G	22	Lina Falk	6 ft 2 in (1.88 m)	So	Große Schule Wolfenbüttel	Wolfenbüttel, Germany
F	23	Jaydia Martin	6 ft 0 in (1.83 m)	Sr	Eastern Washington	Vancouver, WA
G	24	Sophia Lee	5 ft 7 in (1.7 m)	RS So	BYU	Stockton, CA
F	31	Noemi Arvai	6 ft 1 in (1.85 m)	Fr	KSC Szekszárd	Budapest, Hungary
F	45	Fatoumata Jaiteh	6 ft 2 in (1.88 m)	Jr	Northern Arizona	Lynnwood, WA

Head coach

- Aaron Kallhoff (Bemidji State)

Assistant coach(es)

- De'Audra Brown (Elizabeth City State)
- Jodi Page (Central Queensland)
- Asha Thomas (California)

Legend

- (C) Team captain
- (S) Suspended
- (I) Ineligible
- (W) Walk-on
- Injured
- Current redshirt

Roster
Last update: January 14, 2025

== Schedule and results ==
Date time, TV	Rank^{#}	Opponent^{#}	Result	Record	High points	High rebounds	High assists	Site (attendance) city, state
Exhibition
October 28, 2024*; 6:30 p.m.		Cal State East Bay	W 71–58	–	20 – Martin	5 – Versteeg	9 – Versteeg	Hornets Nest (342); Sacramento, CA
Non-conference regular season
November 4, 2024*; 6:30 p.m., ESPN+		Jessup	W 78–51	1–0	17 – Falk	9 – Falk	7 – Alonso	Hornets Nest (425); Sacramento, CA
November 7, 2024*; 6:30 p.m., ESPN+		UC San Diego	W 71–60	2–0	16 – 2 tied	9 – Jaiteh	7 – Versteeg	Hornets Nest (340); Sacramento, CA
November 10, 2024*; 2:00 p.m., ESPN+		Lincoln	W 88–55	3–0	18 – Falk	10 – Taylor	5 – Versteeg	Hornets Nest (397); Sacramento, CA
November 14, 2024*; 7:00 p.m., ESPN+		at Cal State Fullerton	W 67–40	4–0	13 – 2 tied	5 – 2 tied	6 – Versteeg	Titan Gym (266); Fullerton, CA
November 17, 2024*; 2:00 p.m., ESPN+		Long Beach State	L 68–69	4–1	20 – Falk	11 – Versteeg	7 – Versteeg	Hornets Nest (411); Sacramento, CA
November 20, 2024*; 6:00 p.m., ESPN+		at UC Davis	L 45–76	4–2	16 – Versteeg	7 – Versteeg	3 – Versteeg	University Credit Union Center (783); Davis, CA
November 29, 2024*; 11:00 a.m., ESPN+		vs. Abilene Christian; FIU Thanksgiving Tournament	L 53–75	4–3	11 – Martin	3 – 3 tied	3 – Butcher	Ocean Bank Convocation Center; Miami, FL
December 1, 2024*; 8:00 a.m., ESPN+		vs. Wagner; FIU Thanksgiving Tournament	W 73–34	5–3	20 – Peneueta	9 – Peneueta	6 – 2 tied	Ocean Bank Convocation Center (431); Miami, FL
December 4, 2024*; 6:30 p.m., ESPN+		Kansas City; Big Sky-Summit League Challenge	W 74–57	6–3	31 – Martin	7 – Martin	6 – Versteeg	Hornets Nest (329); Sacramento, CA
December 7, 2024*; 12:00 p.m., SLN		at Omaha; Big Sky-Summit League Challenge	L 63–67	6–4	22 – Martin	11 – Falk	5 – Versteeg	Baxter Arena (757); Omaha, NE
December 15, 2024*; 2:00 p.m., ESPN+		San Jose State	W 66–39	7–4	17 – Martin	7 – Martin	4 – 2 tied	Hornets Nest (327); Sacramento, CA
December 19, 2024*; 6:00 p.m., MWN		at New Mexico; Lobo Invitational	L 57–69	7–5	17 – Martin	5 – Lee	8 – Versteeg	The Pit (4,260); Albuquerque, NM
December 20, 2024*; 1:00 p.m., MWN		vs. Abilene Christian; Lobo Invitational	L 49–80	7–6	14 – Falk	4 – 2 tied	9 – Versteeg	The Pit; Albuquerque, NM
Big Sky regular season
January 4, 2025; 2:00 p.m., ESPN+		at Portland State	W 76–74 ^{OT}	8–6 (1–0)	28 – Jaiteh	8 – Falk	10 – Versteeg	Viking Pavilion (530); Portland, OR
January 9, 2025; 6:00 p.m., ESPN+		at Idaho	L 48–63	8–7 (1–1)	13 – Versteeg	11 – Peneueta	4 – Versteeg	ICCU Arena; Moscow, ID
January 11, 2025; 2:00 p.m., ESPN+		at Eastern Washington	L 80–89	8–8 (1–2)	23 – Martin	6 – Peneueta	7 – Versteeg	Reese Court (642); Cheney, WA
January 16, 2025; 6:30 p.m., ESPN+		Northern Arizona	L 70–75	8–9 (1–3)	20 – Martin	13 – 2 tied	6 – Versteeg	Hornets Nest (318); Sacramento, CA
January 18, 2025; 2:00 p.m., ESPN+		Northern Colorado	W 51–48	9–9 (2–3)	14 – 2 tied	9 – Martin	6 – Versteeg	Hornets Nest (668); Sacramento, CA
January 23, 2025; 6:00 p.m., ESPN+		at Idaho State	W 72–63	10–9 (3–3)	23 – Versteeg	7 – 2 tied	6 – Versteeg	Reed Gym (828); Pocatello, ID
January 25, 2025; 1:00 p.m., ESPN+		at Weber State	L 52–68	10–10 (3–4)	11 – Versteeg	7 – 2 tied	7 – Martin	Dee Events Center (394); Ogden, UT
January 30, 2025; 6:30 p.m., ESPN+		Montana State	L 45–67	10–11 (3–5)	9 – Butcher	9 – Peneueta	5 – Versteeg	Hornets Nest (473); Sacramento, CA
February 1, 2025; 2:00 p.m., ESPN+		Montana	L 63–69	10–12 (3–6)	16 – Martin	9 – 2 tied	8 – Versteeg	Hornets Nest (543); Sacramento, CA
February 6, 2025; 6:30 p.m., ESPN+		Eastern Washington	L 53–68	10–13 (3–7)	20 – Versteeg	6 – 3 tied	7 – Versteeg	Hornets Nest (732); Sacramento, CA
February 8, 2025; 1:00 p.m., ESPN+		Idaho	W 56–53	11–13 (4–7)	18 – Martin	7 – Falk	4 – 2 tied	Hornets Nest (623); Sacramento, CA
February 13, 2025; 11:00 a.m., ESPN+		at Northern Colorado	L 72–85	11–14 (4–8)	20 – Martin	7 – Falk	6 – Versteeg	Bank of Colorado Arena (2,821); Greeley, CO
February 15, 2025; 1:00 p.m., ESPN+		at Northern Arizona	L 60–75	11–15 (4–9)	18 – Peneueta	8 – Martin	12 – Versteeg	Findlay Toyota Court (523); Flagstaff, AZ
February 20, 2025; 6:30 p.m., ESPN+		Weber State	W 56–45	12–15 (5–9)	16 – Martin	7 – Martin	3 – Butcher	Hornets Nest (346); Sacramento, CA
February 22, 2025; 2:00 p.m., ESPN+		Idaho State	L 41–50	12–16 (5–10)	15 – Versteeg	11 – Versteeg	9 – Versteeg	Hornets Nest (407); Sacramento, CA
February 27, 2025; 6:00 p.m., ESPN+		at Montana	L 63–71	12–17 (5–11)	18 – Jaiteh	12 – Versteeg	10 – Versteeg	Dahlberg Arena (3,008); Missoula, MT
March 1, 2025; 1:00 p.m., ESPN+		at Montana State	W 73–69	13–17 (6–11)	19 – Peneueta	7 – 2 tied	11 – Versteeg	Worthington Arena (3,357); Bozeman, MT
March 3, 2025; 6:30 p.m., ESPN+		Portland State	W 69–57	14–17 (7–11)	19 – Falk	8 – Peneueta	12 – Versteeg	Hornets Nest (793); Sacramento, CA
Big Sky tournament
March 8, 2025; 1:30 p.m., ESPN+	(8)	vs. (7) Eastern Washington; First round	W 71–67	15–17	26 – Martin	10 – Martin	11 – Versteeg	Idaho Central Arena; Boise, ID
March 9, 2025; 1:30 p.m., ESPN+	(8)	vs. (2) Northern Arizona; Quarterfinals	L 65–69	15–18	24 – Versteeg	9 – Versteeg	5 – Versteeg	Idaho Central Arena; Boise, ID
*Non-conference game. ^{#}Rankings from AP poll. (#) Tournament seedings in parentheses. All times are in Pacific.
