= 2024–25 Portland State Vikings women's basketball team =

American college basketball season

2024–25 Portland State Vikings women's basketball
- Conference: Big Sky Conference
- Record: 4–24 (1–17 Big Sky)
- Head coach: Chelsey Gregg (4th season)
- Associate head coach: Keithan Gregg
- Assistant coaches: Ashley Bolston; Graham McFall
- Home arena: Viking Pavilion

2024–25 Big Sky women's basketball standings
	Conf.				Overall
Team	W		L	PCT	W		L	PCT
Montana State †	17	–	1	.944	30	–	4	.882
Northern Arizona	16	–	2	.889	27	–	8	.771
Idaho	10	–	8	.556	18	–	12	.600
Weber State	10	–	8	.556	13	–	16	.448
Idaho State	8	–	10	.444	14	–	17	.452
Montana	8	–	10	.444	14	–	18	.438
Eastern Washington	7	–	11	.389	11	–	20	.355
Sacramento State	7	–	11	.389	15	–	18	.455
Northern Colorado	6	–	12	.333	14	–	17	.452
Portland State	1	–	17	.056	4	–	24	.143
† 2025 Big Sky tournament winner

The 2024–25 Portland State Vikings women's basketball team represented Portland State University during the 2024–25 NCAA Division I women's basketball season. The Vikings, led by fourth-year head coach Chelsey Gregg, played their home games at the Viking Pavilion in Portland, Oregon as members of the Big Sky Conference.

The Vikings finished the season 4–24, 1–17 in Big Sky play, to finish in tenth (last) place. They were beaten by Northern Colorado in the first round of the Big Sky tournament.

== Previous season ==
The Vikings finished the 2023–24 season 8–23, 3–15 in Big Sky play, to finish in tenth (last) place. They were defeated by Weber State in the first round of the Big Sky tournament.

== Roster ==
2024–25 Portland State Vikings women's basketball team
Players
Coaches

Pos.	#	Name	Height	Year	Previous school	Hometown
G/F	0	Sofía Llanos	6 ft 0 in (1.83 m)	Sr	Marshall	Tarragona, Spain
G/F	1	Alaya Fitzgerald	5 ft 11 in (1.8 m)	Sr	Mesquite High School	Gilbert, AZ
G	2	Jamia Carter	5 ft 7 in (1.7 m)	Jr	Seward County Community College	Las Vegas, NV
G	3	Brooklyn Strandy	6 ft 0 in (1.83 m)	Jr	West Albany High School	Albany, OR
G	5	Avery Kraft	5 ft 6 in (1.68 m)	Fr	Helena High School	Helena, MT
F	8	Joy Haltom	5 ft 11 in (1.8 m)	So	Juanita High School	Kirkland, WA
G	10	Kirstine Munk	6 ft 0 in (1.83 m)	So	Central Arizona College	Copenhagen, Denmark
G	11	Laynee Torres-Kahapea	5 ft 6 in (1.68 m)	So	Punahou School	Kaneohe, HI
G	12	Kyleigh Brown	5 ft 8 in (1.73 m)	Fr	Silverton High School	Silverton, OR
G	13	Alani Encinas	5 ft 7 in (1.7 m)	Jr	Buena High School	Sierra Vista, AZ
F	15	Lana Wenger	6 ft 4 in (1.93 m)	Sr	Texas Tech	Hersberg, Switzerland
F	20	Katelyn Best	6 ft 3 in (1.91 m)	Fr	Northwest Christian School	Phoenix, AZ
F	21	Courtney Turner	5 ft 11 in (1.8 m)	RS Sr	FIU	Middletown, DE
C	22	Rhema Ogele	6 ft 3 in (1.91 m)	Sr	St. Ignatius College Prep	Chicago, IL
G	23	Taylor Moffat	5 ft 8 in (1.73 m)	Jr	Williston State College	Mount Barker, Australia
G	25	Cici Ellington	6 ft 0 in (1.83 m)	RS Sr	Grambling State	Portland, OR

Head coach

- Chelsey Gregg (Southern Oregon)

Assistant coach(es)

- Keithan Gregg (Great Falls)
- Ashley Bolston (Portland State)
- Graham McFall (UW–Superior)

Legend

- (C) Team captain
- (S) Suspended
- (I) Ineligible
- (W) Walk-on
- Injured
- Current redshirt

Roster
Last update: January 15, 2025

== Schedule and results ==
Date time, TV	Rank^{#}	Opponent^{#}	Result	Record	High points	High rebounds	High assists	Site (attendance) city, state
Exhibition
November 3, 2024*; 1:00 p.m.		Montana Tech	W 63–55	–	22 – Moffat	15 – Ogele	6 – Torres-Kahapea	Viking Pavilion (259); Portland, OR
Non-conference regular season
November 9, 2024*; 7:30 p.m., ESPN+		Hawaii	L 50–72	0–1	15 – Carter	9 – Ogele	4 – Fitzgerald	Viking Pavilion (437); Portland, OR
November 12, 2024*; 6:00 p.m., ESPN+		at San Francisco	L 56–62	0–2	18 – Wenger	8 – Wenger	3 – 2 tied	War Memorial Gymnasium (348); San Francisco, CA
November 16, 2024*; 6:00 p.m., ESPN+		at Seattle	W 67–57	1–2	14 – Fitzgerald	10 – Ogele	5 – Fitzgerald	Redhawk Center (536); Seattle, WA
November 24, 2024*; 1:00 p.m., ESPN+		Cal State Fullerton	W 61–52	2–2	14 – Ogele	7 – Ogele	5 – Torres-Kahapea	Viking Pavilion (385); Portland, OR
November 30, 2024*; 2:00 p.m., ESPN+		UC Davis	W 66–61	3–2	18 – Brown	13 – Ogele	4 – Moffat	Viking Pavilion (373); Portland, OR
December 4, 2024*; 7:00 p.m., ESPN+		Omaha; Big Sky–Summit League Challenge	L 57–65	3–3	18 – Brown	10 – Brown	3 – Moffat	Viking Pavilion (301); Portland, OR
December 7, 2024*; 12:00 p.m., SLN		at Denver; Big Sky–Summit League Challenge	L 41–57	3–4	11 – Brown	10 – Ogele	3 – Llanos	Hamilton Gymnasium (947); Denver, CO
December 13, 2024*; 6:00 p.m., ESPN+		at Portland	L 46–71	3–5	11 – Fitzgerald	9 – Ogele	2 – 2 tied	Chiles Center (557); Portland, OR
December 20, 2024*; 1:00 p.m., ESPN+		Air Force	L 40–69	3–6	14 – Ogele	7 – Ogele	3 – Torres-Kahapea	Viking Pavilion (363); Portland, OR
Big Sky regular season
January 4, 2025; 2:00 p.m., ESPN+		Sacramento State	L 74–76 ^{OT}	3–7 (0–1)	27 – Fitzgerald	7 – Ogele	5 – Fitzgerald	Viking Pavilion (530); Portland, OR
January 9, 2025; 6:00 p.m., ESPN+		at Eastern Washington	L 49–78	3–8 (0–2)	11 – 2 tied	6 – Torres-Kahapea	3 – Torres-Kahapea	Reese Court (575); Cheney, WA
January 11, 2025; 2:00 p.m., ESPN+		at Idaho	L 56–60	3–9 (0–3)	17 – Fitzgerald	8 – Fitzgerald	4 – Fitzgerald	ICCU Arena (1,242); Moscow, ID
January 16, 2025; 7:00 p.m., ESPN+		Northern Colorado	W 58–52	4–9 (1–3)	14 – Ogele	10 – Ogele	9 – Brown	Viking Pavilion (471); Portland, OR
January 18, 2025; 2:00 p.m., ESPN+		Northern Arizona	L 53–76	4–10 (1–4)	15 – Fitzgerald	7 – Ogele	4 – Torres-Kahapea	Viking Pavilion (436); Portland, OR
January 23, 2025; 5:00 p.m., ESPN+		at Weber State	L 48–62	4–11 (1–5)	11 – 2 tied	4 – 3 tied	2 – 3 tied	Dee Events Center (325); Ogden, UT
January 25, 2025; 1:00 p.m., ESPN+		at Idaho State	L 52–66	4–12 (1–6)	15 – Brown	5 – Ogele	1 – 3 tied	Reed Gym (983); Pocatello, ID
January 30, 2025; 7:00 p.m., ESPN+		Montana	L 61–73	4–13 (1–7)	16 – Fitzgerald	7 – Ogele	3 – Torres-Kahape	Viking Pavilion (486); Portland, OR
February 1, 2025; 2:00 p.m., ESPN+		Montana State	L 39–85	4–14 (1–8)	12 – Ogele	6 – Ellington	3 – Torres-Kahapea	Viking Pavilion (602); Portland, OR
February 6, 2025; 7:00 p.m., ESPN+		Idaho	L 62–66	4–15 (1–9)	17 – Brown	8 – Wenger	5 – Torres-Kahapea	Viking Pavilion (359); Portland, OR
February 8, 2025; 2:00 p.m., ESPN+		Eastern Washington	L 58–65	4–16 (1–10)	17 – Fitzgerald	11 – Ogele	3 – 3 tied	Viking Pavilion (514); Portland, OR
February 13, 2025; 5:00 p.m., ESPN+		at Northern Arizona	L 67–83	4–17 (1–11)	25 – Fitzgerald	12 – Ogele	6 – Fitzgerald	Findlay Toyota Court (333); Flagstaff, AZ
February 15, 2025; 1:00 p.m., ESPN+		at Northern Colorado	L 50–68	4–18 (1–12)	14 – Ogele	7 – Ogele	3 – Wenger	Bank of Colorado Arena (761); Greeley, CO
February 20, 2025; 7:00 p.m., ESPN+		Idaho State	L 80–89 ^{2OT}	4–19 (1–13)	18 – Fitzgerald	6 – Brown	5 – 2 tied	Viking Pavilion (329); Portland, OR
February 22, 2025; 1:00 p.m., ESPN+		Weber State	L 56–71	4–20 (1–14)	17 – Fitzgerald	14 – Ogele	2 – 3 tied	Viking Pavilion (370); Portland, OR
February 27, 2025; 6:00 p.m., ESPN+		at Montana State	L 49–78	4–21 (1–15)	13 – Haltom	5 – 3 tied	2 – 3 tied	Worthington Arena (2,747); Bozeman, MT
March 1, 2025; 1:00 p.m., ESPN+		at Montana	L 61–74	4–22 (1–16)	19 – Brown	10 – Ogele	4 – 2 tied	Dahlberg Arena (2,413); Missoula, MT
March 3, 2025; 6:30 p.m., ESPN+		at Sacramento State	L 57–69	4–23 (1–17)	17 – Wenger	6 – Haltom	4 – Brown	Hornets Nest (793); Sacramento, CA
Big Sky tournament
March 8, 2025; 11:00 a.m., ESPN+	(10)	vs. (9) Northern Colorado; First round	L 50–53	4–24	14 – Brown	9 – Ogele	5 – Torres-Kahapea	Idaho Central Arena; Boise, ID
*Non-conference game. ^{#}Rankings from AP poll. (#) Tournament seedings in parentheses. All times are in Pacific.
