= 2024–25 Montana State Bobcats women's basketball team =

American college basketball season

2024–25 Montana State Bobcats women's basketball
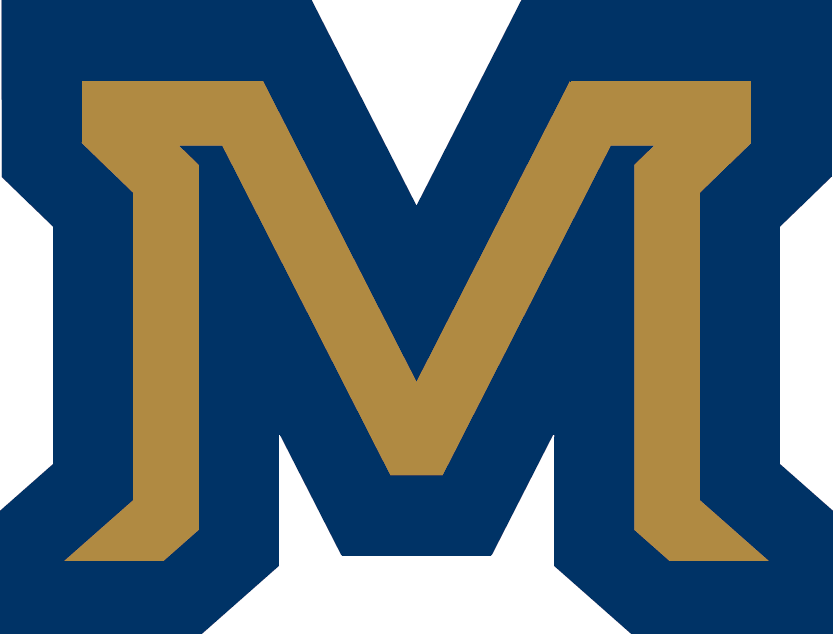

Big Sky regular season & tournament champions

NCAA tournament, First Round
- Conference: Big Sky Conference
- Record: 30–4 (17–1 Big Sky)
- Head coach: Tricia Binford (20th season)
- Assistant coaches: Sunny Smallwood; Ryan Johnson; Devin Perez
- Home arena: Worthington Arena

2024–25 Big Sky women's basketball standings
	Conf.				Overall
Team	W		L	PCT	W		L	PCT
Montana State †	17	–	1	.944	30	–	4	.882
Northern Arizona	16	–	2	.889	27	–	8	.771
Idaho	10	–	8	.556	18	–	12	.600
Weber State	10	–	8	.556	13	–	16	.448
Idaho State	8	–	10	.444	14	–	17	.452
Montana	8	–	10	.444	14	–	18	.438
Eastern Washington	7	–	11	.389	11	–	20	.355
Sacramento State	7	–	11	.389	15	–	18	.455
Northern Colorado	6	–	12	.333	14	–	17	.452
Portland State	1	–	17	.056	4	–	24	.143
† 2025 Big Sky tournament winner

The 2024–25 Montana State Bobcats women's basketball team represented Montana State University during the 2024–25 NCAA Division I women's basketball season. The Bobcats, led by 20th-year head coach Tricia Binford, played their home games at Worthington Arena in Bozeman, Montana, as members of the Big Sky Conference.

== Previous season ==
The Bobcats finished the 2023–24 season 17–16, 10–8 in Big Sky play, to finish in a tie for fourth place. They defeated Northern Colorado, before falling to top-seeded and eventual tournament champions Eastern Washington in the semifinals of the Big Sky tournament.

== Roster ==
2024–25 Montana State Bobcats women's basketball team
Players
Coaches

Pos.	#	Name	Height	Year	Previous school	Hometown
G	2	Natalie Picton	5 ft 5 in (1.65 m)	So	Niagara Prep Academy	Welland, Ontario
F	5	Ella Johnson	6 ft 2 in (1.88 m)	So	Elk River High School	Elk River, Minnesota
G	8	Hannah Robbins	6 ft 0 in (1.83 m)	So	New Mexico	Phoenix, Arizona
G	11	Katelynn Martin	6 ft 2 in (1.88 m)	GS	Silver High School	Silver City, New Mexico
G	12	Esmeralda Morales	5 ft 5 in (1.65 m)	Sr	Portland State	Spanaway, Washington
F	13	Drea Brumfield	6 ft 2 in (1.88 m)	So	Pepperdine	Chehalis, Washington
G	15	Isobel Bunyan	6 ft 0 in (1.83 m)	So	Cardiff Met Archers	Tonyrefail, Wales
G	20	Brooke Berry	6 ft 0 in (1.83 m)	So	New Mexico	Billings, Montana
F	21	Lexi Deden	6 ft 1 in (1.85 m)	Sr	Sentinel High School	Missoula, Montana
F	23	Teagan Erickson	6 ft 2 in (1.88 m)	Fr	Saco High School	Saco, Montana
F	24	Taylor Janssen (5Y)	6 ft 3 in (1.91 m)	Sr	Rosemount High School	Rosemount, Minnesota
G	30	Dylan Philip	5 ft 8 in (1.73 m)	So	Ellensburg High School	Ellensburg, Washington
F	32	Marah Dykstra	6 ft 2 in (1.88 m)	Jr	Churchill Secondary School	Vancouver, British Columbia
F	33	Addison Harris	6 ft 1 in (1.85 m)	Fr	Camas High School	Camas, Washington
G	44	Taylee Chirrick	5 ft 11 in (1.8 m)	Fr	Roberts High School	Roberts, Montana

Head coach

- Tricia Binford (Boise State)

Assistant coach(es)

- Sunny Smallwood (Boise State)
- Ryan Johnson (DePauw)
- Devin Perez (Ottawa)

Legend

- (C) Team captain
- (S) Suspended
- (I) Ineligible
- (W) Walk-on
- (5Y) Fifth-year senior
- Injured
- Current redshirt

Roster
Last update: January 11, 2025

== Schedule and results ==
Date time, TV	Rank^{#}	Opponent^{#}	Result	Record	High points	High rebounds	High assists	Site (attendance) city, state
Exhibition
November 1, 2024*; 7:00 pm		Carroll	W 77–53	–	19 – Dykstra	6 – Erickson	5 – Bunyan	Worthington Arena (1,317); Bozeman, MT
Non-conference regular season
November 4, 2024*; 7:00 pm, ESPN+		Chadron State	W 92–28	1–0	16 – Morales	6 – Harris	5 – Morales	Worthington Arena (1,337); Bozeman, MT
November 7, 2024*; 7:00 pm, ESPN+		Troy	W 73–63	2–0	14 – tied	9 – Chirrick	4 – Dykstra	Worthington Arena (1,367); Bozeman, MT
November 12, 2024*; 11:00 am, ESPN+		Cal Poly	W 75–57	3–0	21 – Morales	6 – Martin	4 – Morales	Worthington Arena (4,117); Bozeman, MT
November 17, 2024*; 2:00 pm, ESPN+		UC Davis	W 77–59	4–0	21 – tied	8 – Martin	4 – tied	Worthington Arena (1,457); Bozeman, MT
November 24, 2024*; 7:00 pm, ESPN+		at Utah	L 53–72	4–1	22 – Dykstra	8 – Martin	4 – Morales	Jon M. Huntsman Center (3,102); Salt Lake City, UT
November 27, 2024*; 3:30 pm		vs. East Carolina; UNLV Thanksgiving Classic	W 62–56	5–1	15 – Morales	4 – tied	3 – Dykstra	Thomas & Mack Center (949); Paradise, NV
November 29, 2024*; 1:00 pm		vs. UCF; UNLV Thanksgiving Classic	W 76–68	6–1	21 – Dykstra	9 – tied	5 – Chirrick	Thomas & Mack Center; Paradise, NV
December 4, 2024*; 7:00 pm, ESPN+		South Dakota; Big Sky/Summit League Challenge	W 77–46	7–1	22 – Philip	8 – Johnson	7 – Morales	Worthington Arena (1,527); Bozeman, MT
December 7, 2024*; 4:00 pm, ESPN+		at Oral Roberts; Big Sky/Summit League Challenge	L 80–82 ^{OT}	7–2	25 – Morales	9 – Dykstra	3 – tied	Mabee Center (2,111); Tulsa, OK
December 16, 2024*; 4:00 pm, ESPN+		at Florida Gulf Coast	W 58–49	8–2	20 – Dykstra	7 – tied	3 – Dykstra	Alico Arena (1,429); Fort Myers, FL
December 19, 2024*; 8:30 am		vs. Presbyterian; Puerto Rico Clasico	W 57–40	9–2	15 – Dykstra	7 – Martin	3 – tied	Coliseo Rubén Rodríguez (100); Bayamón, PR
December 20, 2024*; 8:30 am		vs. Puerto Rico–Mayagüez; Puerto Rico Clasico	W 75–38	10–2	15 – Dykstra	11 – tied	3 – tied	Coliseo Rubén Rodríguez (100); Bayamón, PR
Big Sky regular season
January 2, 2025; 7:00 pm, ESPN+		Idaho	W 59–56	11–2 (1–0)	17 – Morales	8 – Morales	4 – tied	Worthington Arena (1,527); Bozeman, MT
January 4, 2025; 2:00 pm, ESPN+		Eastern Washington	W 66–54	12–2 (2–0)	19 – Martin	7 – Martin	3 – Morales	Worthington Arena (1,517); Bozeman, MT
January 9, 2025; 6:00 pm, ESPN+		at Northern Colorado	W 68–57	13–2 (3–0)	15 – tied	5 – Dykstra	3 – tied	Bank of Colorado Arena (691); Greeley, CO
January 11, 2025; 2:00 pm, ESPN+		at Northern Arizona	W 87–81	14–2 (4–0)	30 – Morales	8 – Dykstra	5 – Morales	Findlay Toyota Court (512); Flagstaff, AZ
January 16, 2025; 7:00 pm, ESPN+		Idaho State	W 94–52	15–2 (5–0)	24 – Picton	5 – Chirrick	9 – Picton	Worthington Arena (1,867); Bozeman, MT
January 18, 2025; 2:00 pm, ESPN+		Weber State	W 75–51	16–2 (6–0)	12 – Picton	5 – Martin	6 – Chirrick	Worthington Arena (2,567); Bozeman, MT
January 20, 2025; 7:00 pm, ESPN+		at Eastern Washington	W 58–56	17–2 (7–0)	15 – Morales	7 – Dykstra	2 – Morales	Reese Court (655); Cheney, WA
January 25, 2025; 2:00 pm, ESPN+		at Montana	W 67–66	18–2 (8–0)	17 – Morales	6 – tied	6 – Morales	Dahlberg Arena (3,432); Missoula, MT
January 30, 2025; 7:30 pm, ESPN+		at Sacramento State	W 67–45	19–2 (9–0)	17 – Morales	6 – tied	5 – Morales	Hornets Nest (473); Sacramento, CA
February 1, 2025; 3:00 pm, ESPN+		at Portland State	W 85–39	20–2 (10–0)	20 – Morales	7 – Dykstra	4 – tied	Viking Pavilion (602); Portland, OR
February 6, 2025; 7:00 pm, ESPN+		Northern Arizona	W 73–66	21–2 (11–0)	25 – Morales	8 – Chirrick	4 – Morales	Worthington Arena (2,977); Bozeman, MT
February 8, 2025; 2:00 pm, ESPN+		Northern Colorado	W 65–44	22–2 (12–0)	14 – Morales	6 – tied	3 – tied	Worthington Arena (2,397); Bozeman, MT
February 13, 2025; 6:00 pm, ESPN+		at Weber State	W 63–45	23–2 (13–0)	14 – Dykstra	6 – Martin	5 – Morales	Dee Events Center (313); Ogden, UT
February 15, 2025; 2:00 pm, ESPN+		at Idaho State	W 74–60	24–2 (14–0)	29 – Dykstra	5 – Chirrick	4 – Morales	Reed Gym (877); Pocatello, ID
February 22, 2025; 2:00 pm, ESPN+		Montana	W 98–66	25–2 (15–0)	28 – Morales	5 – tied	5 – tied	Worthington Arena (4,127); Bozeman, MT
February 27, 2025; 7:00 pm, ESPN+		Portland State	W 78–49	26–2 (16–0)	14 – Picton	6 – Johnson	4 – tied	Worthington Arena (2,747); Bozeman, MT
March 1, 2025; 2:00 pm, ESPN+		Sacramento State	L 69–73	26–3 (16–1)	23 – Morales	7 – Johnson	4 – Chirrick	Worthington Arena (3,357); Bozeman, MT
March 3, 2025; 7:00 pm, ESPN+		at Idaho	W 67–54	27–3 (17–1)	18 – Martin	8 – tied	4 – Chirrick	ICCU Arena (1,347); Moscow, ID
Big Sky tournament
March 9, 2025; 12:00 pm, ESPN+	(1)	vs. (9) Northern Colorado; Quarterfinals	W 92–60	28–3	16 – Martin	5 – tied	7 – Morales	Idaho Central Arena; Boise, ID
March 11, 2025; 12:00 pm, ESPN+	(1)	vs. (5) Idaho State; Semifinals	W 75–42	29–3	15 – Bunyan	7 – Harris	4 – Morales	Idaho Central Arena; Boise, ID
March 12, 2025; 3:00 pm, ESPNU	(1)	vs. (6) Montana; Championship	W 58–57	30–3	25 – Morales	6 – Dykstra	3 – Morales	Idaho Central Arena (779); Boise, ID
NCAA tournament
March 21, 2025; 3:30 pm, ESPN2	(13 B3)	at (4 B3) No. 15 Ohio State; First Round	L 51–71	30–4	20 – Morales	4 – Chirrick	1 – tied	Value City Arena; Columbus, OH
*Non-conference game. ^{#}Rankings from AP poll. (#) Tournament seedings in parentheses. All times are in Mountain.
