= 2024–25 Weber State Wildcats women's basketball team =

American college basketball season

2024–25 Weber State Wildcats women's basketball
- Conference: Big Sky Conference
- Record: 13–16 (10–8 Big Sky)
- Head coach: Jenteal Jackson (2nd season)
- Assistant coaches: Hillary Baker; Cydney McHenry; Emily Codding
- Home arena: Dee Events Center

2024–25 Big Sky women's basketball standings
	Conf.				Overall
Team	W		L	PCT	W		L	PCT
Montana State †	17	–	1	.944	30	–	4	.882
Northern Arizona	16	–	2	.889	27	–	8	.771
Idaho	10	–	8	.556	18	–	12	.600
Weber State	10	–	8	.556	13	–	16	.448
Idaho State	8	–	10	.444	14	–	17	.452
Montana	8	–	10	.444	14	–	18	.438
Eastern Washington	7	–	11	.389	11	–	20	.355
Sacramento State	7	–	11	.389	15	–	18	.455
Northern Colorado	6	–	12	.333	14	–	17	.452
Portland State	1	–	17	.056	4	–	24	.143
† 2025 Big Sky tournament winner

The 2024–25 Weber State Wildcats women's basketball team represented Weber State University during the 2024–25 NCAA Division I women's basketball season. The Wildcats, led by second-year head coach Jenteal Jackson, played their home games at the Dee Events Center in Ogden, Utah as members of the Big Sky Conference.

== Previous season ==
The Wildcats finished the 2023–24 season 8–25, 4–14 in Big Sky play to finish in a tie for eighth place. They defeated Portland State, before falling to top-seeded and eventual tournament champions Eastern Washington in the quarterfinals of the Big Sky tournament.

== Roster ==
2024–25 Weber State Wildcats women's basketball team
Players
Coaches

Pos.	#	Name	Height	Year	Previous school	Hometown
G	2	Margarita Satini	5 ft 8 in (1.73 m)	GS	Westminster	Salt Lake City, Utah
G	3	Kendra Parra	5 ft 9 in (1.75 m)	Sr	MSU Denver	Del Norte, Colorado
G/F	5	Dakota Nap	6 ft 1 in (1.85 m)	Fr	Hazen High School	Renton, Washington
F	7	Antoniette Emma-Nnopu	5 ft 11 in (1.8 m)	Jr	UNC Greensboro	Geelong, Australia
G	8	Vanna Quintana	5 ft 9 in (1.75 m)	Fr	Buchanan High School	Dinuba, California
G	12	Fui Niumeitolu	5 ft 9 in (1.75 m)	Fr	Alta High School	Sandy, Utah
G	15	Japrix Stubbs	6 ft 0 in (1.83 m)	So	USU Eastern	Cedar City, Utah
F	20	Taylor Smith	6 ft 2 in (1.88 m)	So	Century High School	Pocatello, Idaho
G	21	Kennedy Eskelson	5 ft 8 in (1.73 m)	Sr	College of Southern Idaho	Smithfield, Utah
G	22	Amanda Edwards	5 ft 9 in (1.75 m)	So	San Juan Hills High School	Ladera Ranch, California
G/F	23	Maya Davis	5 ft 11 in (1.8 m)	Fr	Garfield High School	Seattle, Washington
F	24	Rose Bubakar	6 ft 0 in (1.83 m)	Sr	BYU	Frederick, Maryland
G	32	Lanae Billy	5 ft 7 in (1.7 m)	Jr	Fort Lewis	Shiprock, New Mexico
F	44	Mata Peaua	6 ft 2 in (1.88 m)	Fr	Bishop Manogue High School	Reno, Nevada

Head coach

- Jenteal Jackson (Westminster)

Assistant coach(es)

- Hillary Carlson (Wyoming)
- Cydney McHenry (Adams State)
- Emily Codding (Oregon State)

Legend

- (C) Team captain
- (S) Suspended
- (I) Ineligible
- (W) Walk-on
- Injured
- Current redshirt

Roster
Last update: January 12, 2025

== Schedule and results ==
Date time, TV	Rank^{#}	Opponent^{#}	Result	Record	High points	High rebounds	High assists	Site (attendance) city, state
Non-conference regular season
November 4, 2024*; 4:00 pm, ESPN+		Park–Gilbert	W 94–41	1–0	16 – Smith	10 – Eskelson	4 – Tied	Dee Events Center (263); Ogden, UT
November 7, 2024*; 5:30 pm, ESPN+		at Utah	L 46–86	1–1	10 – Tied	5 – Smith	2 – Tied	Jon M. Huntsman Center (3,154); Salt Lake City, UT
November 12, 2024*; 6:00 pm, ESPN+		San Diego	L 63–66	1–2	14 – Billy	11 – Emma-Nnopu	4 – Smith	Dee Events Center (255); Ogden, UT
November 16, 2024*; 7:00 pm, ESPN+		at Utah Tech	L 78–81	1–3	22 – Parra	10 – Emma-Nnopu	4 – Tied	Burns Arena (665); St. George, UT
November 22, 2024*; 7:30 pm, MWN		at Nevada	W 66–62	2–3	18 – Bubakar	9 – Emma-Nnopu	5 – Satini	Lawlor Events Center (1,519); Reno, NV
November 24, 2024*; 2:00 pm, MWN		at Boise State	L 46–96	2–4	13 – Smith	9 – Smith	2 – Tied	ExtraMile Arena (1,366); Boise, ID
December 4, 2024*; 6:00 pm, MidcoSN/SLN		at North Dakota; Big Sky-Summit League Challenge	L 69–73	2–5	20 – Emma-Nnopu	10 – Emma-Nnopu	4 – Bubakar	Betty Engelstad Sioux Center (1,414); Grand Forks, ND
December 14, 2024*; 2:00 pm, ESPN+		at Seattle	W 72–64	3–5	18 – Smith	8 – Emma-Nnopu	6 – Eskelson	Redhawk Center (247); Seattle, WA
December 16, 2024*; 6:00 pm, ESPN+		at Arizona	L 66–87	3–6	13 – Emma-Nnopu	8 – Emma-Nnopu	4 – Nap	McKale Center (6,197); Tucson, AZ
December 20, 2024*; 6:00 pm, ESPN+		Utah Valley	L 55–57	3–7	13 – Tied	16 – Emma-Nnopu	5 – Smith	Dee Events Center (467); Ogden, UT
Big Sky regular season
January 2, 2025; 6:00 pm, ESPN+		Northern Colorado	W 65–52	4–7 (1–0)	17 – Billy	8 – Smith	5 – Parra	Dee Events Center (359); Ogden, UT
January 4, 2025; 2:00 pm, ESPN+		Northern Arizona	L 78–92	4–8 (1–1)	19 – Smith	13 – Emma-Nnopu	5 – Tied	Dee Events Center (472); Ogden, UT
January 11, 2025; 2:00 pm, ESPN+		Idaho State	W 72–67 ^{OT}	5–8 (2–1)	19 – Smith	10 – Tied	3 – Tied	Dee Events Center (401); Ogden, UT
January 16, 2025; 7:00 pm, ESPN+		at Montana	L 70–74	5–9 (2–2)	19 – Parra	12 – Emma-Nnopu	6 – Parra	Dahlberg Arena (2,107); Missoula, MT
January 18, 2025; 2:00 pm, ESPN+		at Montana State	L 51–75	5–10 (2–3)	17 – Smith	10 – Emma-Nnopu	5 – Parra	Worthington Arena (2,567); Bozeman, MT
January 23, 2025; 6:00 pm, ESPN+		Portland State	W 62–48	6–10 (3–3)	20 – Smith	15 – Emma-Nnopu	8 – Parra	Dee Events Center (325); Ogden, UT
January 25, 2025; 2:00 pm, ESPN+		Sacramento State	W 68–52	7–10 (4–3)	30 – Parra	15 – Emma-Nnopu	6 – Parra	Dee Events Center (394); Ogden, UT
January 30, 2025; 6:00 pm, ESPN+		at Idaho	L 62–77	7–11 (4–4)	17 – Bubakar	7 – Smith	2 – Nap	ICCU Arena (1,424); Moscow, ID
February 1, 2025; 2:00 pm, ESPN+		at Eastern Washington	W 62–48	8–11 (5–4)	17 – Parra	13 – Emma-Nnopu	5 – Parra	Reese Court (765); Cheney, WA
February 3, 2025; 6:00 pm, ESPN+		at Northern Arizona	L 76–81	8–12 (5–5)	22 – Parra	10 – Emma-Nnopu	4 – Tied	Findlay Toyota Court (317); Flagstaff, AZ
February 8, 2025; 2:00 pm, ESPN+		at Idaho State	W 79–76 ^{OT}	9–12 (6–5)	24 – Smith	7 – Tied	3 – Tied	Reed Gym (1,162); Pocatello, ID
February 13, 2025; 6:00 pm, ESPN+		Montana State	L 45–63	9–13 (6–6)	9 – Smith	6 – Tied	3 – Tied	Dee Events Center (313); Ogden, UT
February 15, 2025; 2:00 pm, ESPN+		Montana	W 73–69	10–13 (7–6)	16 – Billy	8 – Emma-Nnopu	8 – Parra	Dee Events Center (768); Ogden, UT
February 20, 2025; 7:30 pm, ESPN+		at Sacramento State	L 45–56	10–14 (7–7)	12 – Bubakar	12 – Emma-Nnopu	2 – Parra	Hornets Nest (346); Sacramento, CA
February 22, 2025; 2:00 pm, ESPN+		at Portland State	W 71–56	11–14 (8–7)	22 – Billy	10 – Emma-Nnopu	10 – Parra	Viking Pavilion (370); Portland, OR
February 27, 2025; 6:00 pm, ESPN+		Eastern Washington	W 67–65	12–14 (9–7)	19 – Parra	10 – Bubakar	10 – Parra	Dee Events Center (296); Ogden, UT
March 1, 2025; 2:00 pm, ESPN+		Idaho	L 58–73	12–15 (9–8)	12 – Bubakar	8 – Smith	5 – Parra	Dee Events Center (405); Ogden, UT
March 3, 2025; 6:00 pm, ESPN+		at Northern Colorado	W 68–67 ^{OT}	13–15 (10–8)	13 – Bubakar	10 – Emma-Nnopu	4 – Parra	Bank of Colorado Arena (888); Greeley, CO
Big Sky tournament
March 10, 2025; 12:00 pm, ESPN+	(4)	vs. (5) Idaho State; Quarterfinals	L 42–62	13–16	16 – Billy	10 – Emma-Nnopu	3 – Smith	Idaho Central Arena; Boise, ID
*Non-conference game. ^{#}Rankings from AP Poll. (#) Tournament seedings in parentheses. All times are in Mountain.
