= 2024–25 Northern Arizona Lumberjacks women's basketball team =

American college basketball season

2024–25 Northern Arizona Lumberjacks women's basketball

WBIT, Second Round
- Conference: Big Sky Conference
- Record: 27–8 (16–2 Big Sky)
- Head coach: Loree Payne (8th season)
- Assistant coaches: Kellee Barney; TJ Harris; Ryan Freeman
- Home arena: Rolle Activity Center; Findlay Toyota Court

2024–25 Big Sky women's basketball standings
	Conf.				Overall
Team	W		L	PCT	W		L	PCT
Montana State †	17	–	1	.944	30	–	4	.882
Northern Arizona	16	–	2	.889	27	–	8	.771
Idaho	10	–	8	.556	18	–	12	.600
Weber State	10	–	8	.556	13	–	16	.448
Idaho State	8	–	10	.444	14	–	17	.452
Montana	8	–	10	.444	14	–	18	.438
Eastern Washington	7	–	11	.389	11	–	20	.355
Sacramento State	7	–	11	.389	15	–	18	.455
Northern Colorado	6	–	12	.333	14	–	17	.452
Portland State	1	–	17	.056	4	–	24	.143
† 2025 Big Sky tournament winner

The 2024–25 Northern Arizona Lumberjacks women's basketball team represented Northern Arizona University during the 2024–25 NCAA Division I women's basketball season. The Lumberjacks, led by head coach Loree Payne, played their non-conference home games at the Rolle Activity Center, and play their conference games at Findlay Toyota Court, both in Flagstaff, Arizona, as members of the Big Sky Conference.

== Previous season ==
The Lumberjacks finished the 2023–24 season 25–10, 15–3 in Big Sky play, to finish in second place. They defeated Sacramento State and Montana, before falling to top-seeded Eastern Washington in the Big Sky tournament championship game. They received an automatic bid into the WNIT, where they would fall to South Dakota in the second round.

== Roster ==
2024–25 Northern Arizona Lumberjacks women's basketball team
Players
Coaches

Pos.	#	Name	Height	Year	Previous school	Hometown
F	1	Allie Cummins	5 ft 9 in (1.75 m)	So	Carondelet High School	Concord, CA
G/F	2	Nyah Moran	5 ft 11 in (1.8 m)	Sr	King High School	Riverside, CA
G	5	Taylor Feldman	5 ft 8 in (1.73 m)	Jr	Crean Lutheran High School	Tustin, CA
F	10	Ceren Oturakci	6 ft 1 in (1.85 m)	RS Fr	Çankaya	Ankara, Turkey
G	11	Audrey Taylor	5 ft 6 in (1.68 m)	Jr	Timberline High School	Boise, ID
F	12	Sophie Glancey	6 ft 2 in (1.88 m)	Jr	Timberline High School	Boise, ID
F	13	Ava Schmidt	6 ft 2 in (1.88 m)	So	Eastlake High School	Sammamish, WA
G	15	Leia Beattie	5 ft 9 in (1.75 m)	Sr	Montana State	Midland, TX
G/F	22	Olivia Moran	5 ft 11 in (1.8 m)	Sr	King High School	Riverside, CA
F	23	Talo Li-Uperesa	5 ft 11 in (1.8 m)	RS Sr	Cal State Northridge	San Francisco, CA
G	24	Reilly Clark	5 ft 10 in (1.78 m)	So	Catalina Foothills High School	Tucson, AZ
G/F	30	Faith Curry	6 ft 0 in (1.83 m)	Fr	Liberty High School	Bakersfield, CA
F	33	Saniyah Neverson	6 ft 1 in (1.85 m)	Jr	PHH Prep	Surprise, AZ

Head coach

- Loree Payne (Washington)

Assistant coach(es)

- Kellee Barney (Idaho)
- TJ Harris (Great Falls)
- Ryan Freeman (Florida)

Legend

- (C) Team captain
- (S) Suspended
- (I) Ineligible
- (W) Walk-on
- Injured
- Current redshirt

Roster
Last update: January 11, 2025

== Schedule and results ==
Date time, TV	Rank^{#}	Opponent^{#}	Result	Record	High points	High rebounds	High assists	Site (attendance) city, state
Non-conference regular season
November 4, 2024*; 11:00 a.m., MW Network		at New Mexico	W 80–78	1–0	17 – Glancey	8 – Glancey	7 – Beattie	The Pit (5,114); Albuquerque, NM
November 7, 2024*; 12:00 p.m., MW Network		at UNLV	L 71–85	1–1	18 – 2 tied	10 – Glancey	6 – Beattie	Thomas & Mack Center (803); Paradise, NV
November 11, 2024*; 4:00 p.m., ESPN+		Fort Lewis	W 101–68	2–1	18 – N. Moran	13 – O. Moran	8 – Taylor	Rolle Activity Center (353); Flagstaff, AZ
November 17, 2024*; 3:00 p.m., ESPN+		at Pacific	W 68–63	3–1	24 – Glancey	8 – Neverson	8 – Beattie	Alex G. Spanos Center (522); Stockton, CA
November 20, 2024*; 6:00 p.m., ESPN+		Arizona	W 92–75	4–1	22 – N. Moran	15 – Neverson	5 – 2 tied	Rolle Activity Center (487); Flagstaff, AZ
November 23, 2024*; 6:00 p.m., MW Network		at Colorado State	W 84–80	5–1	25 – Feldman	12 – Feldman	6 – Feldman	Moby Arena (1,354); Fort Collins, CO
November 28, 2024*; 1:30 p.m., BallerTV		vs. James Madison; St. Pete Showcase	W 85–83 ^{OT}	7–1	21 – Glancey	12 – Glancey	6 – Feldman	Tampa Prep (173); Tampa, FL
November 30, 2024*; 11:00 a.m., BallerTV		vs. Tulane; St. Pete Showcase	W 87–70	7–1	17 – Glancey	10 – Glancey	4 – Beattie	Tampa Prep (212); Tampa, FL
December 4, 2024*; 12:00 p.m., ESPN+		Oral Roberts; Big Sky–Summit League Challenge	W 87–80	8–1	22 – Glancey	14 – Neverson	7 – N. Moran	Rolle Activity Center (902); Flagstaff, AZ
December 7, 2024*; 10:00 a.m., MidcoSN+		at South Dakota; Big Sky–Summit League Challenge	L 79–84	8–2	31 – Feldman	10 – Glancey	4 – 2 tied	Sanford Coyote Sports Center (1,423); Vermillion, SD
December 14, 2024*; 2:00 p.m., ESPN+		San Francisco	W 92–83	9–2	18 – N. Moran	7 – Neverson	4 – Feldman	Rolle Activity Center (402); Flagstaff, AZ
December 19, 2024*; 7:00 p.m., MW Network		at Fresno State	L 55–66	9–3	26 – Glancey	10 – Glancey	4 – Beattie	Save Mart Center; Fresno, CA
December 29, 2024*; 2:00 p.m., ESPN+		at Grand Canyon	L 70–79	9–4	25 – Feldman	9 – 2 tied	3 – 2 tied	Global Credit Union Arena (1,689); Phoenix, AZ
Big Sky regular season
January 2, 2025; 7:00 p.m., ESPN+		at Idaho State	W 79–71	10–4 (1–0)	18 – 2 tied	9 – Glancey	4 – Glancey	Reed Gym (816); Pocatello, ID
January 4, 2025; 2:00 p.m., ESPN+		at Weber State	W 92–78	11–4 (2–0)	22 – O. Moran	14 – Glancey	5 – Beattie	Dee Events Center (472); Ogden, UT
January 9, 2025; 6:00 p.m., ESPN+		Montana	W 65–46	12–4 (3–0)	24 – Feldman	12 – Neverson	3 – Feldman	Findlay Toyota Court (347); Flagstaff, AZ
January 11, 2025; 2:00 p.m., ESPN+		Montana State	L 81–87	12–5 (3–1)	21 – Glancey	13 – Glancey	5 – Feldman	Findlay Toyota Court (512); Flagstaff, AZ
January 16, 2025; 7:30 p.m., ESPN+		at Sacramento State	W 75–70	13–5 (4–1)	28 – Feldman	9 – Neverson	5 – Feldman	Hornets Nest (318); Sacramento, CA
January 18, 2025; 3:00 p.m., ESPN+		at Portland State	W 76–53	14–5 (5–1)	23 – Glancey	12 – Glancey	6 – Beattie	Viking Pavilion (436); Portland, OR
January 23, 2025; 6:00 p.m., ESPN+		Eastern Washington	W 75–63	15–5 (6–1)	18 – Feldman	9 – Neverson	5 – Feldman	Findlay Toyota Court (513); Flagstaff, AZ
January 25, 2025; 12:00 p.m., ESPN+		Idaho	W 106–76	16–5 (7–1)	28 – Glancey	8 – Neverson	4 – 2 tied	Findlay Toyota Court (405); Flagstaff, AZ
February 1, 2025; 2:00 p.m., ESPN+		Northern Colorado	W 68–52	17–5 (8–1)	22 – Glancey	7 – Moran	6 – Feldman	Findlay Toyota Court (568); Flagstaff, AZ
February 3, 2025; 6:00 p.m., ESPN+		Weber State	W 81–76	18–5 (9–1)	27 – Feldman	10 – Glancey	5 – Feldman	Findlay Toyota Court (317); Flagstaff, AZ
February 6, 2025; 7:00 p.m., ESPN+		at Montana State	L 66–73	18–6 (9–2)	17 – Feldman	11 – Glancey	3 – Feldman	Worthington Arena (2,977); Bozeman, MT
February 8, 2025; 2:00 p.m., ESPN+		at Montana	W 96–76	19–6 (10–2)	21 – Feldman	8 – Glancey	5 – 3 tied	Dahlberg Arena (2,580); Missoula, MT
February 13, 2025; 6:00 p.m., ESPN+		Portland State	W 83–67	20–6 (11–2)	21 – Glancey	12 – Glancey	6 – 3 tied	Findlay Toyota Court (333); Flagstaff, AZ
February 15, 2025; 2:00 p.m., ESPN+		Sacramento State	W 75–60	21–6 (12–2)	21 – Glancey	11 – Glancey	5 – Moran	Findlay Toyota Court (523); Flagstaff, AZ
February 20, 2025; 7:00 p.m., ESPN+		at Idaho	W 70–65	22–6 (13–2)	21 – Beattie	11 – Neverson	3 – Glancey	ICCU Arena (1,393); Moscow, ID
February 22, 2025; 3:00 p.m., ESPN+		at Eastern Washington	W 88–77	23–6 (14–2)	25 – Glancey	12 – 2 tied	7 – Feldman	Reese Court (745); Cheney, WA
March 1, 2025; 6:00 p.m., ESPN+		at Northern Colorado	W 80–70	24–6 (15–2)	21 – Feldman	9 – Neverson	4 – 2 tied	Bank of Colorado Arena (855); Greeley, CO
March 3, 2025; 6:00 p.m., ESPN+		Idaho State	W 83–71	25–6 (16–2)	23 – 2 tied	8 – Moran	7 – Feldman	Findlay Toyota Court (505); Flagstaff, AZ
Big Sky tournament
March 9, 2025; 1:30 p.m., ESPN+	(2)	vs. (8) Sacramento State; Quarterfinals	W 69–65	26–6	18 – Feldman	16 – Neverson	4 – Feldman	Idaho Central Arena; Boise, ID
March 11, 2025; 1:30 p.m., ESPN+	(2)	vs. (6) Montana; Semifinals	L 67–71	26–7	29 – Glancey	14 – Glancey	3 – Feldman	Idaho Central Arena (621); Boise, ID
WBIT
March 20, 2025*; 6:00 p.m., ESPN+		at (2) Arizona; First round	W 71–69	27–7	23 – Glancey	14 – Glancey	5 – Feldman	McKale Center (2,706); Tucson, AZ
March 23, 2025*; 12:00 p.m., ESPN+		at (3) Belmont; Second round	L 80–81	27–8	18 – Beattie	13 – Neverson	5 – Feldman	Curb Event Center (822); Nashville, TN
*Non-conference game. ^{#}Rankings from AP poll. (#) Tournament seedings in parentheses. All times are in Mountain.
