= 2024–25 Arizona Wildcats women's basketball team =

American college basketball season

2024–25 Arizona Wildcats women's basketball

WBIT, First round
- Conference: Big 12 Conference
- Record: 19–14 (10–8 Big 12)
- Head coach: Adia Barnes (9th season)
- Assistant coaches: Salvo Coppa (9th season); Bett Shelby (2nd season); Anthony Turner (2nd season)
- Home arena: McKale Center

2024–25 Big 12 Conference women's basketball standings
| | Conf. | | | | Overall |
| Team | W | | L | PCT | W | | L | PCT |
|---|---|---|---|---|---|---|---|---|
| No. 6 TCU † | 16 | – | 2 | .889 | 34 | – | 4 | .895 |
| No. 14 Baylor | 15 | – | 3 | .833 | 28 | – | 8 | .778 |
| No. 17 Oklahoma State | 14 | – | 4 | .778 | 25 | – | 7 | .781 |
| No. 16 West Virginia | 13 | – | 5 | .722 | 25 | – | 8 | .758 |
| No. 19 Kansas State | 13 | – | 5 | .722 | 28 | – | 8 | .778 |
| Utah | 13 | – | 5 | .722 | 22 | – | 9 | .710 |
| Iowa State | 12 | – | 6 | .667 | 23 | – | 12 | .657 |
| Arizona | 10 | – | 8 | .556 | 19 | – | 14 | .576 |
| Colorado | 9 | – | 9 | .500 | 21 | – | 13 | .618 |
| Cincinnati | 7 | – | 11 | .389 | 15 | – | 14 | .517 |
| Kansas | 6 | – | 12 | .333 | 16 | – | 14 | .533 |
| BYU | 4 | – | 14 | .222 | 13 | – | 17 | .433 |
| UCF | 4 | – | 14 | .222 | 12 | – | 18 | .400 |
| Texas Tech | 4 | – | 14 | .222 | 19 | – | 18 | .514 |
| Arizona State | 3 | – | 15 | .167 | 10 | – | 22 | .313 |
| Houston | 1 | – | 17 | .056 | 5 | – | 25 | .167 |
† 2025 Big 12 tournament winner Rankings from AP poll

The 2024–25 Arizona Wildcats women's basketball team represented the University of Arizona during the 2024–25 NCAA Division I women's basketball season. The Wildcats were led by ninth-year head coach Adia Barnes. This is the Wildcats' 51st season at the on-campus McKale Center in Tucson, Arizona and 1st season as a member of the Big 12 Conference.

== Previous season ==
The Wildcats finished the 2022–23 season with a record of 18–16, 8–10 in Pac-12 play. The Wildcats were invited to the 2024 NCAA tournament where they defeated Auburn in the First Four before losing to Syracuse in the first round.

== Offseason ==
=== Departures ===
Arizona Wildcats departures
| Name | Number | Pos. | Height | Year | Hometown | Notes |
|---|---|---|---|---|---|---|
| Esmery Martínez | 12 | F | 6'2" | Graduate Student | Hato Mayor del Rey, Dominican Republic | Completed college eligibility |
| Helena Pueyo | 13 | G | 6'0" | Graduate Student | Palma de Mallorca, Spain | Completed college eligibility |

==== Outgoing transfers ====
Arizona outgoing transfers
| Name | Number | Pos. | Height | Year | Hometown | New School | Source |
|---|---|---|---|---|---|---|---|
| Courtney Blakely | 1 | G | 5'8" | Junior | Gary, IN | Transferred to Middle Tennessee | |
| Kailyn Gilbert | 15 | G | 5'8" | Sophomore | Tampa, FL | Transferred to LSU | |
| Salimatou Kourouma | 24 | G/F | 5'11" | (redshirt) Senior | Kati, Mali | Transferred to Oregon | |

=== Acquisitions ===
==== Incoming transfers ====
Arizona incoming transfers
| Name | Number | Pos. | Height | Year | Hometown | Previous School | Years Remaining | Date Eligible | Source |
|---|---|---|---|---|---|---|---|---|---|
| Sahnya Jah | 11 | F | 6'0" | Sophomore | Alexandria, VA | South Carolina | 3 | | |
| Paulina Paris | 23 | G | 5'9' | Junior | Congers, NY | North Carolina | 2 | | |
| Jorynn Ross | 24 | F | 6'3" | Sophomore | Milwaukee, WI | Pepperdine | 3 | | |
| Ajae Yoakum | 5 | F | 6'0" | Graduate student | Portland, OR | FIU | 1 | | |

==== 2024 recruiting class ====
College recruiting information
| Name | Hometown | School | Height | Weight | Commit date |
|---|---|---|---|---|---|
| Katarina Kneževic; F | Belgrade, Serbia | Spar Gran Canaria | 6 ft 0 in (1.83 m) | N/A | Mar 13, 2024 |
| Katarina Kneževic; F | Recruit ratings: No ratings found | | | | |
| Mailien Rolf; G | Roßdorf, Germany | Rhein-Main Baskets | 5 ft 10 in (1.78 m) | N/A | Mar 14, 2024 |
| Mailien Rolf; G | Recruit ratings: No ratings found | | | | |
| Lauryn Swann; G | Queens, NY | Long Island Lutheran High School | 5 ft 7 in (1.70 m) | N/A | Feb 3, 2024 |
| Lauryn Swann; G | Recruit ratings: ESPN: (92) | | | | |
Overall recruit ranking:
Note: In many cases, Scout, Rivals, 247Sports, On3, and ESPN may conflict in their listings of height and weight.; In these cases, the average was taken. ESPN grades are on a 100-point scale.; Sources: "2024 Player Commits". ESPN. Archived from the original on November 7, 2024.; "2024 Team Ranking". Rivals.

== Preseason ==
=== Preseason rankings ===
Big 12 media poll (Coaches)
| Predicted finish | Team | Votes (1st place) |
| 1 | Kansas State | 211 (7) |
| 2 | Iowa State | 209 (6) |
| 3 | Baylor | 194 (2) |
| 4 | TCU | 185 |
| 5 | West Virginia | 184 (1) |
| 6 | Utah | 149 |
| 7 | Arizona | 136 |
| 8 | Kansas | 128 |
| 9 | Colorado | 113 |
| 10 | Texas Tech | 84 |
| 11 | Oklahoma State | 80 |
| 12 | BYU | 59 |
| 13 | Cincinnati | 56 |
| 14 | UCF | 54 |
| 15 | Arizona State | 51 |
| 16 | Houston | 27 |

== Roster ==
2024–25 Arizona Wildcats women's basketball team
Players
Coaches

| Pos. | # | Name | Height | Year | Previous school | Hometown |
|---|---|---|---|---|---|---|
| G | 1 | Lauryn Swann | 5 ft 7 in (1.7 m) | Fr | Long Island Lutheran HS | Queens, NY |
| G | 2 | Jada Williams | 5 ft 8 in (1.73 m) | So | La Jolla County Day | Kansas City, MO |
| G | 4 | Skylar Jones | 6 ft 0 in (1.83 m) | So | Whitney Young HS | Chicago, IL |
| F | 5 | Ajae Yoakum | 6 ft 0 in (1.83 m) | GS | Benson Polytechnic HS; FIU | Portland, OR |
| F | 10 | Erin Tack | 6 ft 1 in (1.85 m) | Jr | Kelso HS | Kelso, WA |
| F | 11 | Sahnya Jah | 6 ft 0 in (1.83 m) | So | Montverde Academy; South Carolina | Alexandria, VA |
| F | 12 | Montaya Dew | 6 ft 2 in (1.88 m) | RS So | Centennial | Las Vegas, NV |
| G | 13 | Mailien Rolf | 5 ft 10 in (1.78 m) | Fr | Bertolt-Brecht-Schule; Rhein-Main Baskets | Roßdorf, Germany |
| F | 14 | Brooklyn Rhodes | 6 ft 0 in (1.83 m) | So | Whitfield School | St. Louis, MO |
| G | 23 | Paulina Paris | 5 ft 9 in (1.75 m) | Jr | Saddle River Day School; North Carolina | Congers, NY |
| F | 24 | Jorynn Ross | 6 ft 3 in (1.91 m) | So | Summer Creek HS; Pepperdine | Milwaukee, WI |
| F | 25 | Breya Cunningham | 6 ft 4 in (1.93 m) | So | La Jolla County Day | Chula Vista, CA |
| F | 33 | Isis Beh | 6 ft 3 in (1.91 m) | RS Sr | Murray; West Virginia | Murray, UT |
| F | 34 | Katarina Kneževic | 6 ft 0 in (1.83 m) | Fr | Spar Gran Canaria | Belgrade, Serbia |

Head coach

- Adia Barnes (Arizona)

Assistant coach(es)

- Salvo Coppa (IULM)
- Bett Shelby (Greensboro)
- Anthony Turner (Colorado)

Legend

- (C) Team captain
- (S) Suspended
- (I) Ineligible
- (W) Walk-on
- Injured
- Current redshirt

Roster

== Schedule and results ==
| Date time, TV | Rank^{#} | Opponent^{#} | Result | Record | High points | High rebounds | High assists | Site (attendance) city, state |
Exhibition
| October 25, 2024*; 6:00 p.m., ESPN+ | | West Texas A&M | W 84–59 | | 15 – Williams | 7 – Tied | 3 – Tied | McKale Center (6,486); Tucson, AZ |
| October 29, 2024*; 6:00 p.m., ESPN+ | | Cal State LA | W 82–53 | | 16 – Jones | 7 – Jah | 5 – Williams | McKale Center (6,533); Tucson, AZ |
Non-conference regular season
| November 4, 2024*; 4:00 p.m., ESPN+ | | UT Arlington | W 73–54 | 1–0 | 10 – Tied | 10 – Cunningham | 3 – Jones | McKale Center; Tucson, AZ |
| November 7, 2024*; 6:00 p.m., ESPN+ | | Tarleton State | W 62–39 | 2–0 | 16 – Jones | 9 – Rolf | 4 – Williams | McKale Center (6,751); Tucson, AZ |
| November 10, 2024*; 3:00 p.m., ESPN+ | | at UC San Diego | W 65–54 | 3–0 | 16 – Cunningham | 9 – Cunningham | 3 – Paris | LionTree Arena (754); San Diego, CA |
| November 12, 2024*; 6:00 p.m., ESPN+ | | UNLV | W 75–66 | 4–0 | 19 – Swann | 9 – Cunningham | 5 – Jones | McKale Center (7,221); Tucson, AZ |
| November 16, 2024*; 12:00 p.m., NEC Front Row | | at Chicago State | W 84–48 | 5–0 | 14 – Cunningham | 10 – Rolf | 3 – Tied | Jones Convocation Center (333); Chicago, IL |
| November 20, 2024*; 6:00 p.m., ESPN+ | | at Northern Arizona | L 75–92 | 5–1 | 20 – Paris | 8 – Paris | 3 – Paris | Rolle Activity Center (487); Flagstaff, AZ |
| November 23, 2024*; 6:00 p.m., ESPN+ | | Grambling State | W 84–60 | 6–1 | 17 – Swann | 8 – Cunningham | 3 – Dew | McKale Center (7,609); Tucson, AZ |
| November 26, 2024*; 2:30 p.m., TruTV | | vs. Vanderbilt; Acrisure Classic semifinal | L 60–71 | 6–2 | 20 – Williams | 9 – Cunningham | 3 – Paris | Acrisure Arena (450); Thousand Palms, CA |
| November 27, 2024*; 12:00 p.m., TruTV | | vs. California; Acrisure Classic third-place game | L 62–74 | 6–3 | 18 – Williams | 5 – Jah | 2 – Tied | Acrisure Arena (325); Thousand Palms, CA |
| December 2, 2024*; 6:00 p.m., ESPN+ | | Seattle | W 78–43 | 7–3 | 22 – Paris | 11 – Dew | 8 – Paris | McKale Center (6,191); Tucson, AZ |
| December 5, 2024*; 6:00 p.m., ESPN+ | | Grand Canyon | L 66–69 | 7–4 | 20 – Cunningham | 6 – Tied | 4 – Williams | McKale Center (6,292); Tucson, AZ |
| December 10, 2024*; 6:00 p.m., ESPN+ | | Cal State Bakersfield | W 76–39 | 8–4 | 13 – Tied | 6 – Kneževic | 4 – Williams | McKale Center (6,243); Tucson, AZ |
| December 16, 2024*; 6:00 p.m., ESPN+ | | Weber State | W 87–66 | 9–4 | 24 – Williams | 10 – Jah | 7 – Williams | McKale Center (6,197); Tucson, AZ |
Big 12 regular season
| December 21, 2024; 4:00 p.m., ESPN+ | | at BYU | W 57–53 | 10–4 (1–0) | 21 – Cunningham | 8 – Cunningham | 3 – Dew | Marriott Center (2,075); Provo, UT |
| December 31, 2024; 12:00 p.m., ESPN+ | | Utah | L 48–69 | 10–5 (1–1) | 22 – Swann | 5 – Paris | 3 – Williams | McKale Center (6,958); Tucson, AZ |
| January 4, 2025; 12:00 p.m., ESPN+ | | at UCF | W 75–53 | 11–5 (2–1) | 17 – Jones | 7 – Rolf | 4 – Williams | Addition Financial Arena (1,385); Orlando, FL |
| January 8, 2025; 6:00 p.m., ESPN+ | | Baylor | L 76–81 ^{OT} | 11–6 (2–2) | 18 – Beh | 12 – Cunningham | 6 – Rolf | McKale Center (6,398); Tucson, AZ |
| January 11, 2025; 2:00 p.m., ESPN+ | | Iowa State | L 58–79 | 11–7 (2–3) | 17 – Williams | 8 – Cunningham | 4 – Williams | McKale Center (7,246); Tucson, AZ |
| January 16, 2025; 5:30 p.m., ESPN+ | | at No. 11 Kansas State | L 47–62 | 11–8 (2–4) | 16 – Beh | 10 – Cunningham | 2 – Tied | Bramlage Coliseum (4,356); Manhattan, KS |
| January 19, 2025; 1:00 p.m., ESPN+ | | at Kansas | W 74–59 | 12–8 (3–4) | 17 – Swann | 10 – Beh | 5 – Williams | Allen Fieldhouse (4,049); Lawrence, KS |
| January 22, 2025; 6:00 p.m., ESPN+ | | Cincinnati | W 72–62 | 13–8 (4–4) | 16 – Jones | 15 – Cunningham | 4 – Williams | McKale Center (6,371); Tucson, AZ |
| January 25, 2025; 6:30 p.m., ESPN+ | | No. 16 West Virginia | W 77–62 | 14–8 (5–4) | 18 – Cunningham | 9 – Cunningham | 5 – Paris | McKale Center (7,773); Tucson, AZ |
| January 31, 2025; 6:30 p.m., FS1 | | at Utah | L 58–67 | 14–9 (5–5) | 25 – Williams | 7 – Williams | 3 – Tied | Jon M. Huntsman Center (4,431); Salt Lake City, UT |
| February 5, 2025; 7:00 p.m., ESPN+ | | at Colorado | L 47–56 | 14–10 (5–6) | 12 – Tied | 7 – Rolf | 3 – Beh | CU Events Center (2,748); Boulder, CO |
| February 8, 2025; 2:00 p.m., ESPN+ | | Arizona State | W 66–59 | 15–10 (6–6) | 18 – Williams | 8 – Cunningham | 5 – Beh | McKale Center (8,370); Tucson, AZ |
| February 12, 2025; 5:30 p.m., ESPN+ | | at No. 20 Oklahoma State | L 64–83 | 15–11 (6–7) | 24 – Beh | 6 – Jones | 5 – Paris | Gallagher-Iba Arena (2,675); Stillwater, OK |
| February 16, 2025; 2:00 p.m., ESPN+ | | No. 11 TCU | L 73–85 | 15–12 (6–8) | 30 – Jones | 5 – Jones | 6 – Paris | McKale Center (7,672); Tucson, AZ |
| February 19, 2025; 6:00 p.m., ESPN+ | | BYU | W 65–57 | 16–12 (7–8) | 13 – Beh | 8 – Cunningham | 3 – Jones | McKale Center (6,957); Tucson, AZ |
| February 22, 2025; 6:00 p.m., ESPN+ | | at Houston | W 74–72 ^{OT} | 17–12 (8–8) | 18 – Tied | 15 – Cunningham | 3 – Tied | Fertitta Center (1,198); Houston, TX |
| February 25, 2025; 6:00 p.m., ESPN+ | | Texas Tech | W 66–57 | 18–12 (9–8) | 15 – Beh | 8 – Dew | 4 – Paris | McKale Center (6,911); Tucson, AZ |
| March 1, 2025; 6:00 p.m., ESPN+ | | at Arizona State | W 71–59 | 19–12 (10–8) | 18 – Swann | 8 – Tied | 5 – Paris | Desert Financial Arena (3,136); Tempe, AZ |
Big 12 Women's Tournament
| March 6, 2025; 12:30 p.m., ESPN+ | (8) | vs. (9) Colorado; First Round | L 58–61 | 19–13 | 17 – Jones | 14 – Beh | 5 – Williams | T-Mobile Center (4,265); Kansas City, MO |
WBIT
| March 20, 2025*; 6:00 p.m., ESPN+ | (2) | Northern Arizona; First Round | L 69-71 | 19–14 | 21 – Jones | 11 – Cunningham | 6 – Beh | McKale Center (2,706); Tucson, AZ |
*Non-conference game. ^{#}Rankings from AP Poll. (#) Tournament seedings in parentheses. All times are in Mountain Time.

== Rankings ==
Ranking movements Legend: — = Not ranked
| | Week | | | | | | | | | | | | | | | | | | | |
| Poll | Pre | 1 | 2 | 3 | 4 | 5 | 6 | 7 | 8 | 9 | 10 | 11 | 12 | 13 | 14 | 15 | 16 | 17 | 18 | Final |
|---|---|---|---|---|---|---|---|---|---|---|---|---|---|---|---|---|---|---|---|---|
| AP | — | | | | | | | | | | | | | | | | | | | Not released |
| Coaches | — | | | | | | | | | | | | | | | | | | | |

== Media coverage ==
=== Radio ===
- ESPN Tucson - 1490 AM & 104.09 FM (ESPN Radio) and Nationwide - Dish Network, SiriusXM, Varsity Network and iHeartRadio)
- KCUB 1290 AM – Football Radio Show – (Tucson, AZ)
- KHYT – 107.5 FM (Tucson, AZ)
- KTKT 990 AM – La Hora de Los Gatos (Spanish) – (Tucson, AZ)
- KGME 910 AM – (IMG Sports Network) – (Phoenix, AZ)
- KTAN 1420 AM – (Sierra Vista, AZ)
- KDAP 96.5 FM (Douglas, Arizona)
- KWRQ 102.3 FM – (Safford, AZ/Thatcher, AZ)
- KIKO 1340 AM – (Globe, AZ)
- KVWM 970 AM – (Show Low, AZ/Pinetop-Lakeside, AZ)
- XENY 760 – (Nogales, Sonora) (Spanish)
- KTZR (1450 AM) - (FoxSports 1450) - (Tucson, AZ)

=== TV ===
- CBS Family – KOLD (CBS), CBSN
- ABC/ESPN Family – KGUN (ABC), ABC, ESPN, ESPN2, ESPNU, ESPN+,
- FOX Family – KMSB (FOX), FOX/FS1, FSN
- NBC Family – KVOA, NBC Sports, NBCSN
- PBS - KUAT
- Univision/Telemundo/Estrella TV - KUVE/KHRR/KUDF-LP (Spanish)

== See also ==
- 2024–25 Arizona Wildcats men's basketball team
