= Jenteal Jackson =

American college basketball coach

Current position
- Title: Head coach
- Team: Weber State
- Conference: Big Sky
- Record: 32–63 (.337)

Biographical details
- Born: Salt Lake City, Utah, U.S.

Coaching career (HC unless noted)
- 2013–2021: Westminster (assistant)
- 2021–2023: Westminster
- 2023–present: Weber State

Head coaching record
- Overall: 66–84 (.440)

Jenteal Jackson is an American basketball coach who is the current head coach of the Weber State Wildcats women's basketball team.

== Early life and playing career ==
Jackson was born in Salt Lake City, Utah and attended Skyline High School where she was a state champion in three sports.

== Coaching career ==
On April 12, 2023, Jackson was named head coach at Weber State, the 7th in program history.

== Head coaching record ==
Statistics overview
Season	Team	Overall	Conference	Standing	Postseason
Westminster Griffins (Rocky Mountain) (2021–2023)
2021–22	Westminster	17–9	16–5		
2022–23	Westminster	17–12	15–7		
Westminster:		34–21 (.618)	31–12 (.721)		
Weber State Wildcats (Big Sky) (2023–present)
2023–24	Weber State	8–25	4–14	9th	
2024–25	Weber State	13–16	10–8	T-3rd	
2025–26	Weber State	11–22	4–14	9th	
Weber State:		32–63 (.337)	18–36 (.333)		
Total:		66–84 (.440)			
National champion Postseason invitational champion Conference regular season champion Conference regular season and conference tournament champion Division regular season champion Division regular season and conference tournament champion Conference tournament champion
