= 2025 Big Sky Conference women's basketball tournament =

American collegiate postseason tournament

- Classification: Division I
- Season: 2024–25
- Teams: 10
- Site: Idaho Central Arena; Boise, Idaho
- Champions: Montana State (4th title)
- Winning coach: Tricia Bader Binford (3rd title)
- MVP: Esmeralda Morales (Montana State)
- Television: ESPN2, ESPN+, ESPNU

2024–25 Big Sky women's basketball standings
	Conf.				Overall
Team	W		L	PCT	W		L	PCT
Montana State †	17	–	1	.944	30	–	4	.882
Northern Arizona	16	–	2	.889	27	–	8	.771
Idaho	10	–	8	.556	18	–	12	.600
Weber State	10	–	8	.556	13	–	16	.448
Idaho State	8	–	10	.444	14	–	17	.452
Montana	8	–	10	.444	14	–	18	.438
Eastern Washington	7	–	11	.389	11	–	20	.355
Sacramento State	7	–	11	.389	15	–	18	.455
Northern Colorado	6	–	12	.333	14	–	17	.452
Portland State	1	–	17	.056	4	–	24	.143
† 2025 Big Sky tournament winner

The 2025 Big Sky Conference women's basketball tournament was the postseason tournament for the Big Sky Conference, which was held on March 8-12, 2025 at Idaho Central Arena in Boise, Idaho. It was the 42nd edition of the tournament, which debuted in 1983. Montana State received the Big Sky's automatic bid to the 2025 NCAA tournament.

== Seeds ==
The ten teams were seeded by conference record, with a tiebreaker system for identical conference records. The top six teams will receive a first-round bye.

Seed	School	Record	Tiebreaker
1	Montana State	17–1	
2	Northern Arizona	16–2	
3	Idaho	10–8	2–0 vs. Weber State
4	Weber State	10–8	0–2 vs. Idaho
5	Idaho State	8–10	2–0 vs. Idaho
6	Montana	8–10	0–2 vs. Idaho
7	Eastern Washington	7–11	2–0 vs. Sacramento State
8	Sacramento State	7–11	0–2 vs. Eastern Washington
9	Northern Colorado	6–12	
10	Portland State	1–17	

== Schedule ==
Session	Game	Time	Matchup	Score	Television
First round – Saturday, March 8
1	1	12:00 pm	No. 9 Northern Colorado vs No. 10 Portland State	53–50	ESPN+
1	2	2:30 pm	No. 7 Eastern Washington vs No. 8 Sacramento State	67–71	ESPN+
Quarterfinals – Sunday, March 9
2	3	12:00 pm	No. 1 Montana State vs No. 9 Northern Colorado	92–60	ESPN+
2	4	2:30 pm	No. 2 Northern Arizona vs No. 8 Sacramento State	69–65	ESPN+
Quarterfinals – Monday, March 10
3	5	12:00 pm	No. 4 Weber State vs No. 5 Idaho State	42–62	ESPN+
3	6	2:30 pm	No. 3 Idaho vs No. 6 Montana	54–65	ESPN+
Semifinals – Tuesday, March 11
4	7	12:00 pm	No. 1 Montana State vs No. 5 Idaho State	75–42	ESPN+
4	8	2:30 pm	No. 2 Northern Arizona vs No. 6 Montana	67–71	ESPN+
Championship game – Wednesday, March 12
5	9	3:00 pm	No. 1 Montana State vs No. 6 Montana	58–57	ESPNU
Game times in MST for the first round and MDT from the quarterfinals onward. Rankings denote tournament seeding.

== Bracket ==
First round March 8 ESPN+
9	Northern Colorado	53
10	Portland State	50
7	Eastern Washington	67
8	Sacramento State	71

Quarterfinals; March 9 & 10; ESPN+
1	Montana State	92
9	Northern Colorado	60
4	Weber State	42
5	Idaho State	62
2	Northern Arizona	69
8	Sacramento State	65
3	Idaho	54
6	Montana	65

Semifinals; March 11; ESPN+
1	Montana State	75
5	Idaho State	42
2	Northern Arizona	67
6	Montana	71

Championship; March 12; ESPNU
1	Montana State	58
6	Montana	57
