= Idaho Central Credit Union Arena =

University of Idaho athletic arena in Moscow, Idaho

- ICCU Arena; Bud Ford Court
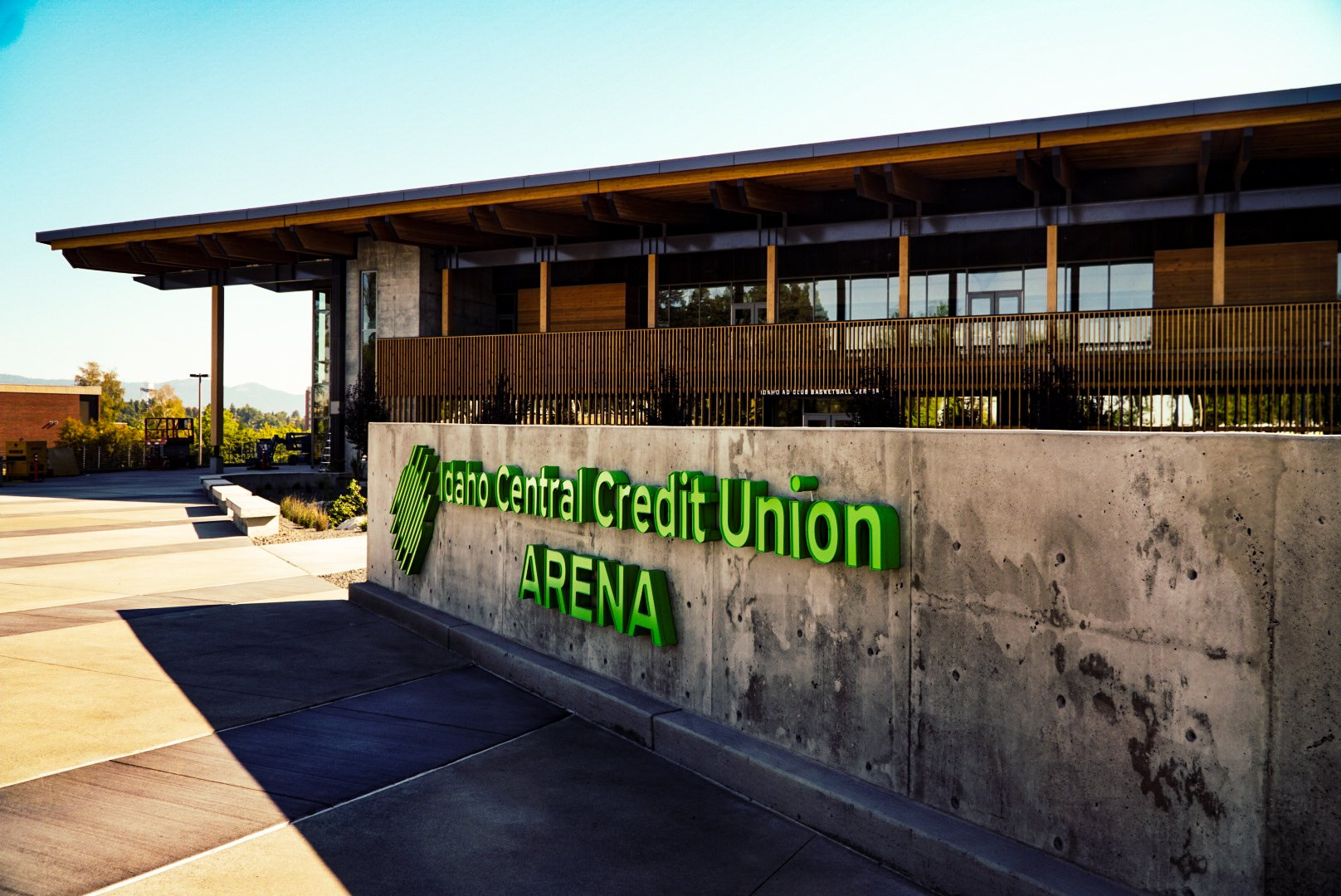
- View from southwest in 2021

- Location in the United States Location in Idaho
- Interactive map of Idaho Central Credit Union Arena
- Full name: Idaho Central Credit Union Arena
- Address: 900 Stadium Drive
- Location: University of Idaho; Moscow, Idaho, U.S.
- Coordinates: 46°43′39″N 117°01′05″W
- Elevation: 2,600 ft (790 m) AMSL
- Owner: University of Idaho
- Operator: University of Idaho
- Capacity: 4,200

Construction
- Groundbreaking: June 6, 2019
- Opened: October 8, 2021; 5 years ago
- Cost: $51,000,000
- Architects: Opsis Architecture, Hastings + Chivetta, StructureCraft
- General contractor: Hoffman Construction Company

Tenant
- Idaho Vandals (NCAA) (2021–present)

Idaho Central Credit Union Arena (commonly known as ICCU Arena) is an athletic arena in the northwest United States, located on the campus of the University of Idaho in Moscow, Idaho. Opened in autumn 2021, it is the home of the Idaho Vandals of the Big Sky Conference and serves as the primary venue for men's and women's basketball. Just north of the Kibbie Dome, the elevation at street level is approximately 2,600 feet (790 m) above sea level.

== History ==
The university had long sought to build a new basketball-centric arena to replace the nearly century-old Memorial Gymnasium. Both the men's and women's basketball programs had left the Mem Gym in 1976 for the Kibbie Dome, the Vandals' football stadium which was enclosed in the summer of 1975.

This move initially proved successful, as the larger space accommodated the soaring crowds that accompanied the men's teams run of success under head coach Don Monson in the early 1980s, which included a 43-game home winning streak. The temporary seating capacity for basketball gradually increased and attendance topped out at 11,800 against Montana in 1983 to set a Big Sky attendance record (but the loss snapped the streak).

However, smaller crowds and the cavernous size of the Kibbie Dome led to the venue being described as "sterile" for basketball. The university conducted a $670,000 renovation to the basketball configuration in 2001 to curtain off the "arena" from the larger dome and install new hanging scoreboards and lighting; the new "arena within an arena" was named the Cowan Spectrum after donors Bob and Jan Cowan. While the improvements modestly improved the ambience of the venue, scheduling remained an issue as the Kibbie Dome could not be converted into the Cowan Spectrum during the football season, leaving the men's and women's basketball teams to play their early season games at the aging and inadequate Memorial Gym.

In 2007, the university initiated a feasibility study for the construction of a new on-campus 6,000-seat events center adjacent to the Kibbie Dome; however, the estimated cost of $70 million was deemed too high and the project was shelved.

The need for a new basketball facility became further evident when an unoccupied section of the Spectrum's temporary bleachers collapsed during pre-game warmups ahead of a February 2014 match-up against Seattle.

== Planning and construction ==
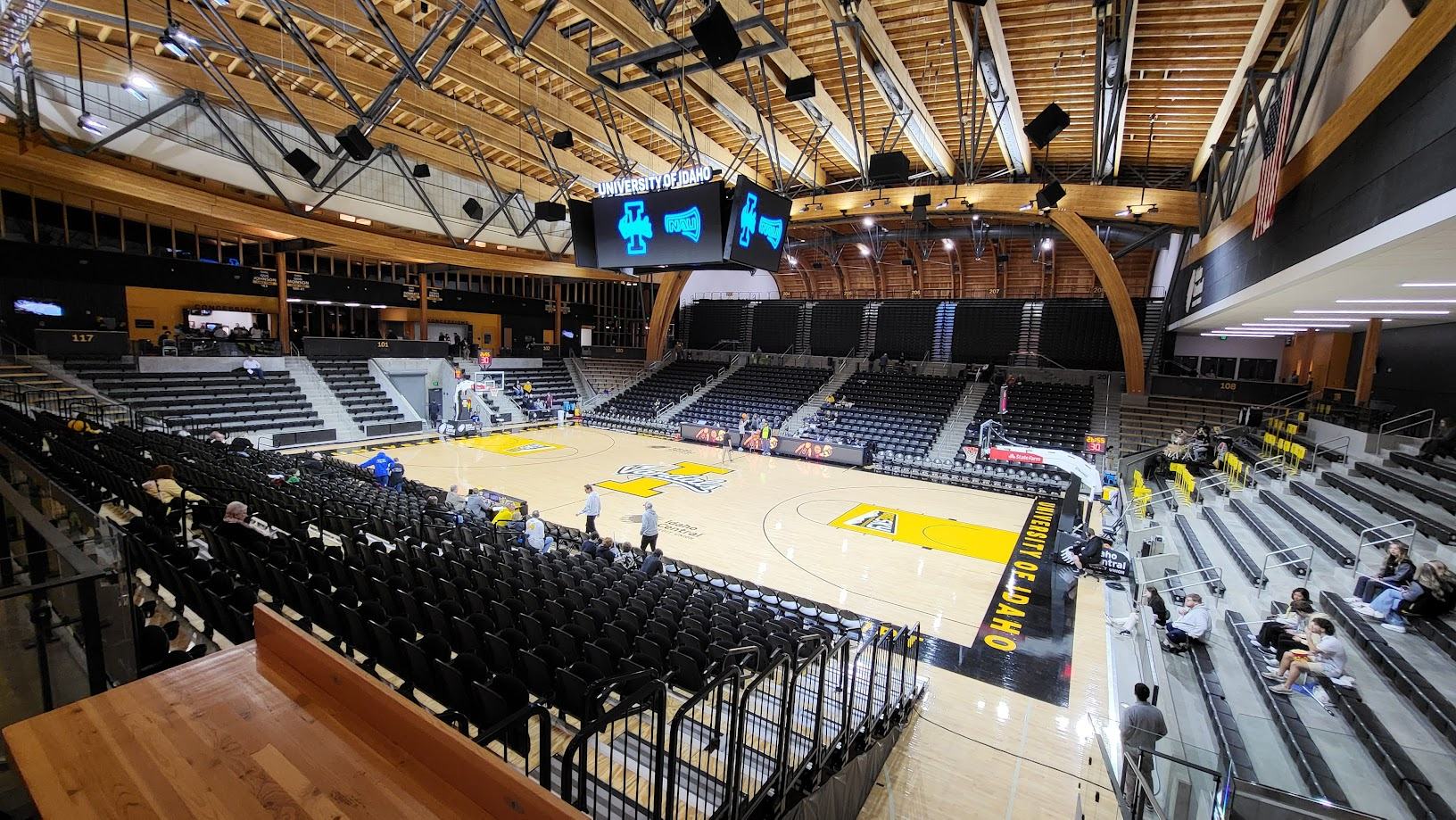
Interior view from southwest

Planning began in 2017 for construction of a new on-campus events center, led by university president Chuck Staben and athletic director Rob Spear. An early proposal to the Idaho State Board of Education in February 2017 indicated plans for a 6,000-seat arena for a projected cost of $30 million.

By 2018, these plans had been revised to be a 4,200-seat arena located north of the Kibbie Dome, built entirely of wood from the university's Experimental Forest, at a cost of $48 million (with another $3 million necessary for associated infrastructure improvements). The university selected Opsis Architecture to design the arena, as well as the firm Hastings and Chivetta to design the arena's interior. The arena's curved wooden roof was designed by StructureCraft. The building design drew comparisons to the Richmond Olympic Oval (particularly the curved wooden roof), which StructureCraft was also involved with designing.

On March 14, 2019, the Board of Education unanimously voted to allow the university to proceed to the construction phase of the project.

The arena's naming rights were awarded to Idaho Central Credit Union on a 35-year deal following a $10 million gift to the university to assist with the construction. Additionally, the university named the playing surface Bud Ford Court following Ford's donation of $2.5 million towards the construction of the new arena.

An official ground-breaking ceremony was held on June 6, 2019, and was attended by U.S. Forest Service Chief Vicki Christiansen and Idaho Central Credit Union CEO Kent Oram. Following the laying of concrete, construction of the wooden structure of the arena began in early June 2020.

== Opening ==
The arena opened in autumn 2021 with a ribbon-cutting ceremony on October 8; its first event was on November 5, a concert by alternative rock band Third Eye Blind during the university's family weekend.

The first official basketball game at the arena was on November 9, a 95–46 victory over Lewis–Clark State by the women's team. The men's team played their first official game at the arena the next day, an 89–95 overtime loss to Long Beach State.

== Facilities ==
Perpendicular to the nearby Kibbie Dome's football field, the arena's basketball court runs north-south, with the main entrance on the west side. Behind the main bleachers on the east side is a practice court, parallel to the main court, that players can access at any time, as well as training facilities. The venue also includes offices for the coaching staff, meeting rooms, and a club room.

== See also ==
- List of NCAA Division I basketball arenas
