= 2017–18 Idaho State Bengals women's basketball team =

Intercollegiate basketball season

2017–18 Idaho State Bengals women's basketball
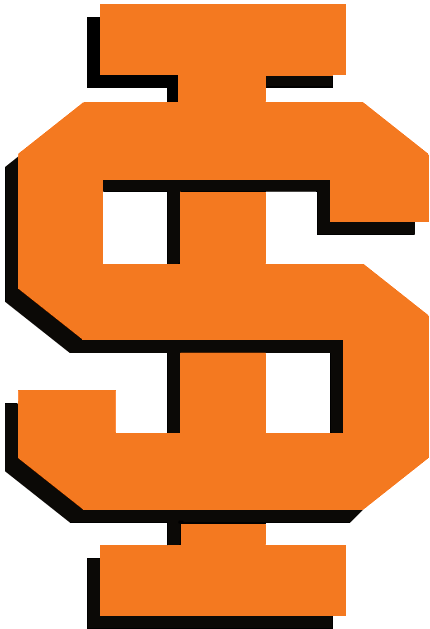
- Conference: Big Sky Conference
- Record: 21–11 (11–7 Big Sky)
- Head coach: Seton Sobolewski (10th season)
- Assistant coaches: Mike Trujillo; Ryan Johnson; Bryanna Mueller
- Home arena: Reed Gym

2017–18 Big Sky women's basketball standings
	Conf.				Overall
Team	W		L	PCT	W		L	PCT
Northern Colorado †	15	–	3	.833	26	–	7	.788
Idaho	13	–	5	.722	19	–	14	.576
Eastern Washington	12	–	6	.667	17	–	14	.548
Weber State	12	–	6	.667	21	–	11	.656
Idaho State	11	–	7	.611	21	–	11	.656
Portland State	11	–	7	.611	19	–	13	.594
Montana	9	–	9	.500	14	–	17	.452
Montana State	9	–	9	.500	16	–	15	.516
North Dakota	5	–	13	.278	12	–	18	.400
Sacramento State	5	–	13	.278	7	–	23	.233
Northern Arizona	4	–	14	.222	7	–	23	.233
Southern Utah	2	–	16	.111	3	–	27	.100
† 2018 Big Sky tournament winner As of 19 March 2018; Rankings from AP poll

The 2017–18 Idaho State Bengals women's basketball team represented Idaho State University during the 2017–18 NCAA Division I women's basketball season. The Bengals, led by tenth year head coach Seton Sobolewski, played their home games at Reed Gym. They were members of the Big Sky Conference. They finished the season 21–11, 11–7 in Big Sky play to finish in a tie for fifth place. They advanced to the semifinals of the Big Sky women's tournament, where they lost to Northern Colorado. Despite having 21 wins and a better record, they were not invited to a postseason tournament for the 2nd year in a row.

== Roster ==
2017–18 Idaho State Bengals women's basketball team
Players
Coaches

Pos.	#	Name	Height	Year	Previous school	Hometown
G	1	Nuria Barrientos	5 ft 11 in (1.8 m)	Fr	Draft Gramenet	Barcelona, Spain
G	2	Grace Kenyon	6 ft 0 in (1.83 m)	RS Jr	Bainbridge HS	Bainbridge Island, WA
G	3	Saylair Grandon	5 ft 10 in (1.78 m)	Jr	Westview HS	Phoenix, AZ
G	4	Madison Hinrichs	5 ft 7 in (1.7 m)	Jr	Port Angeles HS; Lower Columbia	Longview, WA
G	5	Dora Goles	5 ft 7 in (1.7 m)	So	KK Split; Western Wyoming	Split, Croatia
F	10	Nicole Murugarren	6 ft 2 in (1.88 m)	Jr	IES Felipe II; Northeastern JC	Madrid, Spain
F	11	Sai Tapasa	6 ft 2 in (1.88 m)	RS So	Central HS	Monmouth, OR
G	12	Brook Blair	5 ft 8 in (1.73 m)	RS Sr	Rangitoto College; Northeastern Junior College	Murrays Bay, New Zealand
F	13	Ellie Smith	6 ft 2 in (1.88 m)	Fr	Southridge HS	Kennewick, WA
F	14	Estefania Ors	5 ft 10 in (1.78 m)	RS So	Valencia BC	Altura, Spain
F	15	Irene Vicente	6 ft 2 in (1.88 m)	So	Rivas Promete Junior	Alcalá de Henares, Spain
F	22	Delaney Moore	6 ft 0 in (1.83 m)	Fr	Monte Vista Christian	Gilroy, CA
G	23	Amanda Betlere	5 ft 6 in (1.68 m)	Fr	Riga Stradiņš	Riga, Latvia
F	34	Kaitlyn Bell	6 ft 3 in (1.91 m)	Fr	Rigby HS	Rigby, ID

Head coach

- Seton Sobolewski (Northern Arizona)

Assistant coach(es)

- Michael Trujillo (Northern Arizona)
- Ryan Johnson (DePauw)
- Bryanna Mueller (Drake)

Legend

- (C) Team captain
- (S) Suspended
- (I) Ineligible
- (W) Walk-on
- Injured
- Current redshirt

Roster
Last update: December 20, 2017

== Schedule ==
Date time, TV	Rank^{#}	Opponent^{#}	Result	Record	Site (attendance) city, state
Exhibition
11/04/2017*; 7:00 pm		Northwest Nazarene	L 87–95		Reed Gym; Pocatello, ID
Non-conference regular season
11/10/2017*; 7:00 pm		at Seattle	W 74–69	1–0	Connolly Center (350); Seattle, WA
11/12/2017*; 2:00 pm		at Washington	W 79–59	2–0	Alaska Airlines Arena (1,479); Seattle, WA
11/16/2017*; 11:00 am		College of Idaho	W 89–32	3–0	Reed Gym (1,365); Pocatello, ID
11/19/2017*; 3:00 pm		at UC Irvine	W 78–72	4–0	Bren Events Center (302); Irvine, CA
11/21/2017*; 2:00 pm		at Pepperdine	L 74–80	4–1	Firestone Fieldhouse (178); Malibu, CA
11/27/2017*; 7:00 pm		Utah State	W 64–44	5–1	Reed Gym (1,038); Pocatello, ID
12/01/2017*; 8:00 pm		at Washington State	L 55–72	5–2	Beasley Coliseum (652); Pullman, WA
12/03/2017*; 1:00 pm		at Wyoming	L 53–61	5–3	Arena-Auditorium (2,460); Laramie, WY
12/08/2017*; 10:00 pm		at Hawaii	W 64–62 ^{OT}	6–3	Stan Sheriff Center (1,501); Honolulu, HI
12/16/2017*; 3:00 pm		at Utah Valley	W 70–58	7–3	Lockhart Arena (287); Orem, UT
12/28/2017*; 7:00 pm		Westminster	W 83–45	8–3	Reed Gym (1,019); Pocatello, ID
Big Sky regular season
12/30/2017; 2:00 pm		Weber State	L 70–76	8–4 (0–1)	Reed Gym (880); Pocatello, ID
01/04/2018; 6:30 pm		at Southern Utah	L 70–76	8–5 (0–2)	America First Events Center (756); Cedar City, UT
01/06/2018; 5:00 pm		at Northern Arizona	W 75–55	9–5 (1–2)	Walkup Skydome (294); Flagstaff, AZ
01/11/2018; 7:00 pm		North Dakota	W 57–46	10–5 (2–2)	Reed Gym (1,111); Pocatello, ID
01/13/2018; 2:00 pm		Northern Colorado	L 57–63	10–6 (2–3)	Reed Gym (1,037); Pocatello, ID
01/18/2018; 9:00 pm		at Portland State	W 88–59	11–6 (3–3)	Pamplin Sports Center (319); Portland, OR
01/20/2018; 3:00 pm		at Sacramento State	W 85–71	12–6 (4–3)	Hornets Nest (229); Sacramento, CA
01/27/2018; 2:00 pm		at Weber State	L 73–84	12–7 (4–4)	Dee Events Center (846); Ogden, UT
02/01/2018; 7:00 pm		Northern Arizona	W 76–59	13–7 (5–4)	Reed Gym (1,081); Pocatello, ID
02/03/2018; 2:00 pm		Southern Utah	W 66–39	14–7 (7–4)	Reed Gym (974); Pocatello, ID
02/08/2018; 12:00 pm		at Northern Colorado	L 52–75	14–8 (7–5)	Bank of Colorado Arena (2,714); Greeley, CO
02/10/2018; 1:00 pm		at North Dakota	W 68–55	15–8 (8–5)	Betty Engelstad Sioux Center (1,977); Grand Forks, ND
02/15/2018; 7:00 pm		Sacramento State	W 83–71	16–8 (9–5)	Reed Gym (825); Pocatello, ID
02/17/2018; 2:00 pm		Portland State	W 72–64	17–8 (10–5)	Reed Gym (1,068); Pocatello, ID
02/22/2018; 7:00 pm		at Idaho	W 62–52	18–8 (11–5)	Cowan Spectrum (416); Moscow, ID
02/24/2018; 3:00 pm		at Eastern Washington	L 64–66	18–9 (10–6)	Reese Court (523); Cheney, WA
02/28/2018; 7:00 pm		Montana State	L 60–61	18–10 (10–7)	Reed Gym (1,007); Pocatello, ID
03/02/2018; 7:00 pm		Montana	W 72–60	19–10 (11–7)	Reed Gym (1,139); Pocatello, ID
Big Sky Women's Tournament
03/05/2018; 3:35 pm	(5)	vs. (12) Southern Utah; First Round	W 59–49	20–10	Reno Events Center; Reno, NV
03/07/2018; 3:35 pm	(5)	vs. (4) Weber State; Quarterfinals	W 113–109 ^{OT}	21–10	Reno Events Center; Reno, NV
03/09/2018; 3:35 pm, ELVN	(5)	vs. (1) Northern Colorado; Semifinals	L 66–73	21–11	Reno Events Center; Reno, NV
*Non-conference game. ^{#}Rankings from AP Poll. (#) Tournament seedings in parentheses. All times are in Mountain Time.

== See also ==
2017–18 Idaho State Bengals men's basketball team
