= 2017–18 Northern Arizona Lumberjacks women's basketball team =

Intercollegiate basketball season

2017–18 Northern Arizona Lumberjacks women's basketball
- Conference: Big Sky Conference
- Record: 7–23 (3–15 Big Sky)
- Head coach: Loree Payne (1st season)
- Assistant coaches: Kellee Barney; Brandon Huntley
- Home arena: Walkup Skydome; Rolle Activity Center

2017–18 Big Sky women's basketball standings
	Conf.				Overall
Team	W		L	PCT	W		L	PCT
Northern Colorado †	15	–	3	.833	26	–	7	.788
Idaho	13	–	5	.722	19	–	14	.576
Eastern Washington	12	–	6	.667	17	–	14	.548
Weber State	12	–	6	.667	21	–	11	.656
Idaho State	11	–	7	.611	21	–	11	.656
Portland State	11	–	7	.611	19	–	13	.594
Montana	9	–	9	.500	14	–	17	.452
Montana State	9	–	9	.500	16	–	15	.516
North Dakota	5	–	13	.278	12	–	18	.400
Sacramento State	5	–	13	.278	7	–	23	.233
Northern Arizona	4	–	14	.222	7	–	23	.233
Southern Utah	2	–	16	.111	3	–	27	.100
† 2018 Big Sky tournament winner As of 19 March 2018; Rankings from AP poll

The 2017–18 Northern Arizona Lumberjacks women's basketball team represented Northern Arizona University during the 2017–18 NCAA Division I women's basketball season. The Lumberjacks, led by first year head coach Loree Payne, played their home games at the Walkup Skydome. They were members of the Big Sky Conference. They finished the season 7–23, 3–15 in Big Sky to finish in eleventh place. They lost in the first round of the Big Sky women's tournament to Portland State.

== Roster ==
2017–18 Northern Arizona Lumberjacks women's basketball team
Players
Coaches

Pos.	#	Name	Height	Year	Previous school	Hometown
G	3	Desirae Gonzalez (redshirt)	5 ft 10 in (1.78 m)	So	Kingman; Nevada	Kingman, AZ
G	5	Chelena Betoney	5 ft 2 in (1.57 m)	Sr	Valley	Pine Springs, AZ
F	10	Abbey Jensen	6 ft 1 in (1.85 m)	Fr	Kofa	Yuma, AZ
G	11	Olivia Lucero	5 ft 8 in (1.73 m)	RS Sr	Highland; Loyola Marymount	Gilbert, AZ
F	12	Kenna McDavis	6 ft 1 in (1.85 m)	RS Sr	Pinnacle HS; Boise State	Phoenix, AZ
F	15	Khiarica Rasheed	5 ft 11 in (1.8 m)	Fr	Grant	Portland, OR
G	20	Lauren Orndoff	5 ft 10 in (1.78 m)	Fr	South Medford	Medford, OR
G	21	Tate Tsingine	5 ft 10 in (1.78 m)	Jr	Tuba City; Central Arizona	Tuba City, AZ
G	22	Kaprice Boston	5 ft 10 in (1.78 m)	Fr	Lynnwood	Everett, WA
F	23	Kaleigh Paplow	5 ft 8 in (1.73 m)	Jr	Lutheran	Parker, CO
F	24	Shantel Appleby	6 ft 0 in (1.83 m)	So	Mililani	Waipahu, HI
F	25	Brianna Lehew	6 ft 1 in (1.85 m)	RS Fr	Thunderbird	Phoenix, AZ
G	30	Caitlin Malvar (redshirt)	5 ft 9 in (1.75 m)	So	West Linn; Puget Sound	Portland, OR
F	33	Peyton Carroll	6 ft 2 in (1.88 m)	So	Clackamas	Damascus, OR
G/F		Jacey Bailey (redshirt)	6 ft 0 in (1.83 m)	So	Burnaby Mountain; Florida Atlantic	Burnaby, BC
G		Alize McCormick (redshirt)	5 ft 8 in (1.73 m)	Fr	Tucson	Tucson, AZ

Head coach

- Loree Payne (Washington)

Assistant coach(es)

- Kellee Barney (Idaho)
- Brandon Huntley (Johnson & Wales)

Legend

- (C) Team captain
- (S) Suspended
- (I) Ineligible
- (W) Walk-on
- Injured
- Current redshirt

Roster
Last update: December 21, 2017

== Schedule ==
Date time, TV	Rank^{#}	Opponent^{#}	Result	Record	Site (attendance) city, state
Non-conference regular season
11/10/2017*; 6:30 pm		UC Santa Barbara	L 93–96	0–1	Rolle Activity Center (603); Flagstaff, AZ
11/12/2017*; 1:30 pm		Rice	L 83–88	0–2	Rolle Activity Center (297); Flagstaff, AZ
11/17/2017*; 10:00 pm, SPEC		at Hawaii; Bank of Hawaii Classic	L 68–84	0–3	Stan Sheriff Center (1,710); Honolulu, HI
11/19/2017*; 5:30 pm		vs. Boise State; Bank of Hawaii Classic	W 62–60	1–3	Stan Sheriff Center (1,756); Honolulu, HI
11/27/2017*; 6:30 pm		vs. Antelope Valley	W 104–49	2–3	Tuba City HS (793); Tuba City, AZ
12/03/2017*; 1:00 pm		at Denver	L 73–80	2–4	Hamilton Gymnasium (425); Denver, CO
12/07/2017*; 6:30 pm, FSAZ+/FCSP		Arizona	W 84–66	3–4	Rolle Activity Center (383); Flagstaff, AZ
12/09/2017*; 3:30 pm, FSAZ/FCSP		Cal Poly	L 73–89	3–5	Rolle Activity Center (307); Flagstaff, AZ
12/14/2017*; 12:00 pm		Grand Canyon	L 54–72	3–6	Rolle Activity Center (1,240); Flagstaff, AZ
12/16/2017*; 11:00 am, ESPN3		at Youngstown State	L 67–69	3–7	Beeghly Center (1,226); Youngstown, OH
12/18/2017*; 8:00 pm		at Cal State Northridge	L 69–78	3–8	Matadome (252); Northridge, CA
Big Sky regular season
12/28/2017; 7:00 pm		at Montana	L 62–70 ^{OT}	3–9 (0–1)	Dahlberg Arena (2,662); Missoula, MT
12/30/2017; 2:00 pm		at Montana State	L 39–61	3–10 (0–2)	Brick Breeden Fieldhouse (1,636); Bozeman, MT
01/04/2018; 6:30 pm		Weber State	W 76–75	4–10 (1–2)	Walkup Skydome (203); Flagstaff, AZ
01/06/2018; 5:00 pm, CW6		Idaho State	L 55–75	4–11 (1–3)	Walkup Skydome (294); Flagstaff, AZ
01/13/2018; 5:00 pm, CW6		Southern Utah	L 57–60	4–12 (1–4)	Walkup Skydome (300); Flagstaff, AZ
01/18/2018; 7:00 pm		at Eastern Washington	L 62–82	4–13 (1–5)	Reese Court (429); Cheney, WA
01/20/2018; 3:00 pm		at Idaho	L 68–83	4–14 (1–6)	Cowan Spectrum (505); Moscow, ID
01/25/2018; 6:30 pm		Montana State	L 56–78	4–15 (1–7)	Walkup Skydome (435); Flagstaff, AZ
01/27/2018; 5:00 pm, CW6		Montana	L 52–69	4–16 (1–8)	Walkup Skydome (398); Flagstaff, AZ
02/01/2018; 7:00 pm		at Idaho State	L 59–76	4–17 (1–9)	Reed Gym (1,081); Pocatello, ID
02/03/2018; 2:00 pm		at Weber State	L 63–77	4–18 (1–10)	Dee Events Center (789); Ogden, UT
02/10/2018; 12:30 pm		at Southern Utah	W 72–55	5–18 (2–10)	America First Events Center (953); Cedar City, UT
02/15/2018; 6:30 pm		Northern Colorado	L 63–85	5–19 (2–11)	Walkup Skydome (225); Flagstaff, AZ
02/17/2018; 5:00 pm, CW6		North Dakota	W 79–59	6–19 (3–11)	Walkup Skydome (427); Flagstaff, AZ
02/22/2018; 8:00 pm		at Sacramento State	W 95–90 ^{OT}	7–19 (3–12)	Hornets Nest (212); Sacramento, CA
02/24/2018; 2:00 pm		at Portland State	L 59–68	7–20 (3–13)	Pamplin Sports Center (301); Portland, OR
02/28/2018; 6:30 pm		Idaho	L 83–93	7–21 (3–14)	Walkup Skydome (253); Flagstaff, AZ
03/02/2018; 6:30 pm		Eastern Washington	L 83–98	7–22 (3–15)	Walkup Skydome (555); Flagstaff, AZ
Big Sky Women's Tournament
03/05/2018; 9:05 pm	(6)	vs. (11) Portland State; First Round	L 61–77	7–23	Reno Events Center; Reno, NV
*Non-conference game. ^{#}Rankings from AP Poll. (#) Tournament seedings in parentheses. All times are in Mountain Time.

== See also ==
2017–18 Northern Arizona Lumberjacks men's basketball team
