= 2017–18 Sacramento State Hornets women's basketball team =

Intercollegiate basketball season

2017–18 Sacramento State Hornets women's basketball
- Conference: Big Sky Conference
- Record: 7–23 (5–13 Big Sky)
- Head coach: Bunky Harkleroad (5th season)
- Assistant coaches: Derrick Florence; Bill Baxter; Jessica Kunisaki
- Home arena: Hornets Nest

2017–18 Big Sky women's basketball standings
| | Conf. | | | | Overall |
| Team | W | | L | PCT | W | | L | PCT |
|---|---|---|---|---|---|---|---|---|
| Northern Colorado † | 15 | – | 3 | .833 | 26 | – | 7 | .788 |
| Idaho | 13 | – | 5 | .722 | 19 | – | 14 | .576 |
| Eastern Washington | 12 | – | 6 | .667 | 17 | – | 14 | .548 |
| Weber State | 12 | – | 6 | .667 | 21 | – | 11 | .656 |
| Idaho State | 11 | – | 7 | .611 | 21 | – | 11 | .656 |
| Portland State | 11 | – | 7 | .611 | 19 | – | 13 | .594 |
| Montana | 9 | – | 9 | .500 | 14 | – | 17 | .452 |
| Montana State | 9 | – | 9 | .500 | 16 | – | 15 | .516 |
| North Dakota | 5 | – | 13 | .278 | 12 | – | 18 | .400 |
| Sacramento State | 5 | – | 13 | .278 | 7 | – | 23 | .233 |
| Northern Arizona | 4 | – | 14 | .222 | 7 | – | 23 | .233 |
| Southern Utah | 2 | – | 16 | .111 | 3 | – | 27 | .100 |
† 2018 Big Sky tournament winner As of 19 March 2018; Rankings from AP poll

The 2017–18 Sacramento State Hornets women's basketball team represented California State University, Sacramento during the 2017–18 NCAA Division I women's basketball season. The Hornets were led by fifth year head coach Bunky Harkleroad and played their home games at Hornets Nest. They were members of the Big Sky Conference. They finished the season 7–23, 5–13 in Big Sky play to finish in a tie for ninth place. They lost in the first round of the Big Sky women's tournament to Montana.

== Roster ==
2017–18 Sacramento State Hornets women's basketball team
Players
Coaches

| Pos. | # | Name | Height | Year | Previous school | Hometown |
|---|---|---|---|---|---|---|
| G | 3 | Tiara Scott | 5 ft 4 in (1.63 m) | So | St. Anthony HS | Torrance, CA |
| G | 4 | Justyce Dawson | 5 ft 4 in (1.63 m) | Sr | Long Beach Poly HS | Carson, CA |
| G/F | 5 | Tiana Johnson | 6 ft 2 in (1.88 m) | Fr | Flathead HS | Kalispell, MT |
| G | 10 | Gabi Bade (redshirt) | 5 ft 8 in (1.73 m) | Jr | Pinewood School; Buffalo | Milpitas, CA |
| G | 11 | Dana DeGraffenreid | 5 ft 10 in (1.78 m) | Fr | Ridgeview HS | Bakersfield, CA |
| F | 12 | Anna Weibel | 6 ft 3 in (1.91 m) | Fr | Estes Park HS | Estes Park, CO |
| G | 14 | Quayonna Harris | 5 ft 5 in (1.65 m) | So | Sacramento HS | Sacramento, CA |
| G | 20 | Raegen Rohn | 5 ft 6 in (1.68 m) | Jr | Monarch HS | Erie, CO |
| G | 22 | Maranne Johnson | 5 ft 7 in (1.7 m) | Sr | Deer Valley HS | Antioch, CA |
| G | 23 | Skylar Jackson | 5 ft 10 in (1.78 m) | Fr | Bishop Gorman HS | Las Vegas, NV |
| F | 30 | Kyhonta Doughty | 6 ft 1 in (1.85 m) | Sr | Warren Easton HS; Trinity Valley CC | New Orleans, LA |
| G | 32 | Hannah Friend | 6 ft 0 in (1.83 m) | RS So | Farmington HS; Delaware | Troy, NY |
| F | 33 | Kennedy Nicholas | 6 ft 3 in (1.91 m) | So | Inglemoor HS | Kirkland, WA |

Head coach

- Bunky Harkleroad (Berea)

Assistant coach(es)

- Derrick Florence (Morehouse)
- Bill Baxter (UC Davis)
- Jessica Kunisaki (Chapman)

Legend

- (C) Team captain
- (S) Suspended
- (I) Ineligible
- (W) Walk-on
- Injured
- Current redshirt

Roster
Last update: December 21, 2017

== Schedule ==
| Date time, TV | Rank^{#} | Opponent^{#} | Result | Record | Site (attendance) city, state |
Exhibition
| 11/03/2017*; 5:05 pm | | Holy Names | W 100–53 | | Hornets Nest; Sacramento, CA |
Non-conference regular season
| 11/10/2017*; 4:00 pm | | at Kentucky; Matthew Mitchell Classic | L 70–101 | 0–1 | Memorial Coliseum (4,313); Lexington, KY |
| 11/11/2017*; 3:00 pm | | vs. Morehead State; Matthew Mitchell Classic | L 71–75 | 0–2 | Memorial Coliseum (670); Lexington, KY |
| 11/14/2017*; 4:00 pm | | at No. 12 West Virginia | L 47–101 | 0–3 | WVU Coliseum (1,211); Morgantown, WV |
| 11/18/2017*; 1:00 pm | | at Arizona State | L 58–106 | 0–4 | Wells Fargo Arena (1,788); Tempe, AZ |
| 11/24/2017*; 2:00 pm | | at Nevada; Nugget Classic semifinals | L 68–95 | 0–5 | Lawlor Events Center (1,358); Reno, NV |
| 11/25/2017*; 11:00 am | | vs. UC Riverside; Nugget Classic 3rd place game | W 99–72 | 1–5 | Lawlor Events Center (83); Reno, NV |
| 11/30/2017*; 7:00 pm | | at UC Davis | L 72–79 | 1–6 | The Pavilion (408); Davis, CA |
| 12/06/2017*; 5:05 pm | | Antelope Valley | W 95–62 | 2–6 | Hornets Nest (212); Sacramento, CA |
| 12/15/2017*; 6:00 pm | | at San Francisco | L 76–90 | 2–7 | War Memorial Gymnasium (202); San Francisco, CA |
| 12/18/2017*; 12:30 pm | | vs. Miami (FL); Puerto Rico Classic | L 56–82 | 2–8 | Coliseo Rubén Zayas Montañez (105); Trujillo Alto, PR |
| 12/20/2017*; 12:30 pm | | vs. Northern Illinois; Puerto Rico Classic | L 75–84 | 2–9 | Coliseo Rubén Zayas Montañez (104); Trujillo Alto, PR |
Big Sky regular season
| 12/30/2017; 1:00 pm | | at Portland State | L 73–74 | 2–10 (0–1) | Pamplin Sports Center (302); Portland, OR |
| 01/04/2018; 7:05 pm | | Idaho | W 79–64 | 3–10 (1–1) | Hornets Nest (156); Sacramento, CA |
| 01/06/2018; 2:05 pm | | Eastern Washington | L 72–83 | 3–11 (1–2) | Hornets Nest (302); Sacramento, CA |
| 01/11/2018; 6:00 pm | | at Montana | L 59–68 | 3–12 (1–3) | Dahlberg Arena (2,333); Missoula, MT |
| 01/13/2018; 1:00 pm | | at Montana State | L 50–85 | 3–13 (1–4) | Brick Breeden Fieldhouse (2,724); Bozeman, MT |
| 01/18/2018; 12:05 pm | | Weber State | L 56–78 | 3–14 (1–5) | Hornets Nest (505); Sacramento, CA |
| 01/20/2018; 2:05 pm | | Idaho State | L 71–85 | 3–15 (1–6) | Hornets Nest (229); Sacramento, CA |
| 01/27/2018; 1:05 pm | | Portland State | L 72–81 | 3–16 (1–7) | Hornets Nest (272); Sacramento, CA |
| 02/01/2018; 6:05 pm | | at Eastern Washington | L 76–82 | 3–17 (1–8) | Reese Court (332); Cheney, WA |
| 02/03/2018; 2:00 pm | | at Idaho | L 66–101 | 3–18 (1–9) | Cowan Spectrum (419); Moscow, ID |
| 02/08/2018; 7:05 pm | | Montana State | W 88–77 | 4–18 (2–9) | Hornets Nest (243); Sacramento, CA |
| 02/10/2018; 2:05 pm | | Montana | W 79–64 | 5–19 (3–9) | Hornets Nest (214); Sacramento, CA |
| 02/15/2018; 6:05 pm | | at Idaho State | L 71–83 | 5–20 (3–10) | Reed Gym (825); Pocatello, ID |
| 02/17/2018; 1:05 pm | | at Weber State | L 73–86 | 5–21 (3–11) | Dee Events Center (908); Ogden, UT |
| 02/22/2018; 7:05 pm | | Northern Arizona | L 90–95 ^{OT} | 5–22 (3–12) | Hornets Nest (212); Sacramento, CA |
| 02/24/2018; 2:05 pm | | Southern Utah | W 79–77 | 6–22 (4–12) | Hornets Nest (373); Sacramento, CA |
| 02/28/2018; 5:05 pm | | at North Dakota | W 72–66 | 7–22 (5–12) | Betty Engelstad Sioux Center (1,552); Grand Forks, ND |
| 03/02/2018; 6:05 pm | | at Northern Colorado | L 68–90 | 7–23 (5–13) | Bank of Colorado Arena (1,473); Greeley, CO |
Big Sky Women's Tournament
| 03/05/2018; 12:05 pm | (9) | vs. (8) Montana; First Round | L 80–87 | 7–24 | Reno Events Center; Reno, NV |
*Non-conference game. ^{#}Rankings from AP Poll. (#) Tournament seedings in parentheses. All times are in Pacific Time.

== See also ==
2017–18 Sacramento State Hornets men's basketball team
