= 2017–18 Portland State Vikings women's basketball team =

Intercollegiate basketball season

2017–18 Portland State Vikings women's basketball
- Conference: Big Sky Conference
- Record: 19–13 (11–7 Big Sky)
- Head coach: Lynn Kennedy (3rd season)
- Assistant coaches: Chelsey Zimmerman; Amy Denson; Keithan Gregg
- Home arena: Pamplin Sports Center

2017–18 Big Sky women's basketball standings
	Conf.				Overall
Team	W		L	PCT	W		L	PCT
Northern Colorado †	15	–	3	.833	26	–	7	.788
Idaho	13	–	5	.722	19	–	14	.576
Eastern Washington	12	–	6	.667	17	–	14	.548
Weber State	12	–	6	.667	21	–	11	.656
Idaho State	11	–	7	.611	21	–	11	.656
Portland State	11	–	7	.611	19	–	13	.594
Montana	9	–	9	.500	14	–	17	.452
Montana State	9	–	9	.500	16	–	15	.516
North Dakota	5	–	13	.278	12	–	18	.400
Sacramento State	5	–	13	.278	7	–	23	.233
Northern Arizona	4	–	14	.222	7	–	23	.233
Southern Utah	2	–	16	.111	3	–	27	.100
† 2018 Big Sky tournament winner As of 19 March 2018; Rankings from AP poll

The 2017–18 Portland State Vikings women's basketball team represented Portland State University during the 2017–18 NCAA Division I women's basketball season. The Vikings, led by third-year head coach Lynn Kennedy, played their home games at the Pamplin Sports Center due to renovations at Peter Stott Center and were members of the Big Sky Conference. They finished the season 19–13, 11–7 in Big Sky play, to finish in a tie for fifth place. They advanced to the semifinals of the Big Sky women's tournament, where they lost to Idaho.

== Roster ==
2017–18 Portland State Vikings women's basketball team
Players
Coaches

Pos.	#	Name	Height	Year	Previous school	Hometown
G	0	Ashley Bolston	6 ft 2 in (1.88 m)	RS Jr	South Medford HS; Washington State	Medford, OR
G	1	Labrea Denson	5 ft 3 in (1.6 m)	Fr	Chief Sealth	Seattle, WA
G	2	Sidney Rielly	6 ft 0 in (1.83 m)	RS Jr	Everett HS; Santa Clara	Everett, WA
G	3	Kiana Brown	5 ft 8 in (1.73 m)	RS Jr	Triangle Lake HS; Washington State/Humboldt State	Cottage Grove, OR
F	4	Pia Jurhar	6 ft 3 in (1.91 m)	Jr	BRG XIX Krottenbachstraße	Vienna, Austria
F	5	Savannah Dhaliwal	6 ft 0 in (1.83 m)	Fr	Panorama Ridge	Surrey, BC
F	10	Courtney West	6 ft 4 in (1.93 m)	RS Jr	Port Hacking HS; Southern Oregon	Sydney, Australia
F	12	Tatiana Streun	6 ft 0 in (1.83 m)	So	Bellevue HS	Bellevue, WA
G	15	Corey James	5 ft 10 in (1.78 m)	Jr	West Albany HS	Albany, OR
G	22	Ruchae Walton	5 ft 10 in (1.78 m)	Fr	Charnwood	Milton Keynes, England
G	23	Kylie Jimenez	5 ft 6 in (1.68 m)	Fr	Horizon	Thornton, CO
F	25	Elle Pace	6 ft 5 in (1.96 m)	So	Montrose	Montrose, CO
F	32	Jasmin Falls	6 ft 0 in (1.83 m)	So	South Medford HS	Medford, OR

Head coach

- Lynn Kennedy (Northwest)

Assistant coach(es)

- Chelsey Zimmerman (Southern Oregon)
- Amy Denson (Arizona State)
- Keithan Gregg (Great Falls)

Legend

- (C) Team captain
- (S) Suspended
- (I) Ineligible
- (W) Walk-on
- Injured
- Current redshirt

Roster
Last update: May 26, 2024

== Schedule ==
Date time, TV	Rank^{#}	Opponent^{#}	Result	Record	Site (attendance) city, state
Exhibition
10/28/2017*; 9:00 a.m.		at Oregon; Charity Exhibition for Oregon Wildfire Fund	L 60–88		Matthew Knight Arena; Eugene, OR
Non-conference regular season
11/10/2017*; 6:00 p.m.		at UNLV	L 80–88 ^{OT}	0–1	Cox Pavilion (383); Paradise, NV
11/12/2017*; 2:00 p.m.		at Nevada	L 55–67	0–2	Lawlor Events Center (1,140); Reno, NV
11/17/2017*; 7:00 p.m.		at UC Davis	L 67–79	0–3	The Pavilion (335); Davis, CA
11/19/2017*; 2:00 p.m.		at San Jose State	W 90–78	1–3	Event Center Arena; San Jose, CA
11/22/2017*; 6:00 p.m.		at Seattle	L 77–91	1–4	Connolly Center (405); Seattle, WA
11/25/2017*; 1:00 p.m.		Multnomah	W 95–32	2–4	Pamplin Sports Center (101); Portland, OR
11/28/2017*; 7:00 p.m.		at Portland	W 77–71	3–4	Chiles Center (169); Portland, OR
12/02/2017*; 2:00 p.m.		at Gonzaga	L 52–91	3–5	McCarthey Athletic Center (5,298); Spokane, WA
12/09/2017*; 1:00 p.m.		Northwest	W 63–60	4–5	Pamplin Sports Center (103); Portland, OR
12/16/2017*; 2:00 p.m.		at UC Irvine	W 82–72	5–5	Bren Events Center (265); Irvine, CA
12/19/2017*; 8:00 p.m.		Ole Miss	W 94–79	6–5	Pamplin Sports Center (265); Portland, OR
Big Sky regular season
12/30/2017; 1:00 p.m.		Sacramento State	W 74–73	7–5 (1–0)	Pamplin Sports Center (302); Portland, OR
01/04/2018; 8:00 p.m.		Eastern Washington	W 75–60	8–5 (2–0)	Pamplin Sports Center (287); Portland, OR
01/06/2018; 1:00 p.m.		Idaho	L 90–101	8–6 (2–1)	Pamplin Sports Center (352); Portland, OR
01/11/2018; 6:00 p.m.		at Montana State	W 69–60	9–6 (3–1)	Brick Breeden Fieldhouse (1,599); Bozeman, MT
01/13/2018; 1:00 p.m.		at Montana	L 53–69	9–7 (3–2)	Dahlberg Arena (2,866); Missoula, MT
01/18/2018; 8:00 p.m.		Idaho State	L 59–88	9–8 (3–3)	Pamplin Sports Center (319); Portland, OR
01/20/2018; 1:00 p.m.		Weber State	W 77–64	10–8 (4–3)	Pamplin Sports Center (225); Portland, OR
01/27/2018; 1:00 p.m.		at Sacramento State	W 81–72	11–8 (5–3)	Hornets Nest (272); Sacramento, CA
02/01/2018; 6:00 p.m.		at Idaho	L 60–61	11–9 (5–4)	Cowan Spectrum (445); Moscow, ID
02/03/2018; 2:00 p.m.		at Eastern Washington	L 57–64	11–10 (5–5)	Reese Court (604); Cheney, WA
02/08/2018; 8:00 p.m.		Montana	W 70–53	12–10 (6–5)	Pamplin Sports Center (294); Portland, OR
02/10/2018; 1:00 p.m.		Montana State	W 62–53	13–10 (7–5)	Pamplin Sports Center (309); Portland, OR
02/15/2018; 6:00 p.m.		at Weber State	W 62–60	14–10 (8–5)	Dee Events Center (718); Ogden, UT
02/17/2018; 1:00 p.m.		at Idaho State	L 64–72	14–11 (8–6)	Reed Gym (1,068); Pocatello, ID
01/20/2018; 8:00 p.m.		Southern Utah	W 70–66	15–11 (9–6)	Pamplin Sports Center (310); Portland, OR
01/20/2018; 1:00 p.m.		Northern Arizona	W 68–59	16–11 (10–6)	Pamplin Sports Center (301); Portland, OR
02/28/2018; 6:00 p.m.		at Northern Colorado	L 60–63	16–12 (10–7)	Bank of Colorado Arena (1,356); Greeley, CO
03/02/2018; 1:00 p.m.		at North Dakota	W 80–61	17–12 (11–7)	Betty Engelstad Sioux Center (1,601); Grand Forks, ND
Big Sky women's tournament
03/05/2018; 8:05 p.m.	(6)	vs. (11) Northern Arizona; First round	W 77–61	18–12	Reno Events Center; Reno, NV
03/07/2018; 8:05 p.m.	(6)	vs. (3) Eastern Washington; Quarterfinals	W 82–73	19–12	Reno Events Center; Reno, NV
03/09/2018; 2:35 p.m., ELVN	(6)	vs. (2) Idaho; Semifinals	L 99–102	19–13	Reno Events Center; Reno, NV
*Non-conference game. ^{#}Rankings from AP poll. (#) Tournament seedings in parentheses. All times are in Pacific Time.

== See also ==
- 2017–18 Portland State Vikings men's basketball team
