= 2017–18 Weber State Wildcats women's basketball team =

Intercollegiate basketball season

2017–18 Weber State Wildcats women's basketball

WBI, Quarterfinals
- Conference: Big Sky Conference
- Record: 21–11 (12–6 Big Sky)
- Head coach: Bethann Ord (6th season)
- Assistant coaches: Skyler Young; Devan Newman; Matt Thune
- Home arena: Dee Events Center

2017–18 Big Sky women's basketball standings
	Conf.				Overall
Team	W		L	PCT	W		L	PCT
Northern Colorado †	15	–	3	.833	26	–	7	.788
Idaho	13	–	5	.722	19	–	14	.576
Eastern Washington	12	–	6	.667	17	–	14	.548
Weber State	12	–	6	.667	21	–	11	.656
Idaho State	11	–	7	.611	21	–	11	.656
Portland State	11	–	7	.611	19	–	13	.594
Montana	9	–	9	.500	14	–	17	.452
Montana State	9	–	9	.500	16	–	15	.516
North Dakota	5	–	13	.278	12	–	18	.400
Sacramento State	5	–	13	.278	7	–	23	.233
Northern Arizona	4	–	14	.222	7	–	23	.233
Southern Utah	2	–	16	.111	3	–	27	.100
† 2018 Big Sky tournament winner As of 19 March 2018; Rankings from AP poll

The 2017–18 Weber State Wildcats women's basketball team represented Weber State University during the 2017–18 NCAA Division I women's basketball season. The Wildcats were led by sixth year head coach Bethann Ord and played their home games at the Dee Events Center. They were members of the Big Sky Conference. They finished the season 21–10, 11–7 in Big Sky play to finish in a tie for third place. They lost in the quarterfinals of the Big Sky women's tournament to Idaho State. They were invited to the WBI, where they defeated Texas Southern in the first round before losing to Central Arkansas in the quarterfinals.

On June 7, it was announced that Bethann Ord has resigned from Weber State and accept the head coaching job at Binghamton. She finished at Weber State with a 6 year record of 77–137.

== Radio Broadcasts ==
All Wildcats games are heard on KWCR with Nick Bailey calling the action. All home games and conference road games are also streamed with video live online through Watch Big Sky.

== Roster ==
2017–18 Weber State Wildcats women's basketball team
Players
Coaches

Pos.	#	Name	Height	Year	Previous school	Hometown
G	0	Jaiamoni Welch-Coleman	5 ft 3 in (1.6 m)	Jr	Berkeley	Berkeley, CA
F	1	Jocelyn Adams	6 ft 1 in (1.85 m)	Sr	Skyview	Vancouver, WA
G	3	Paulina Rodriguez	5 ft 10 in (1.78 m)	So	Montverde Academy	Chihuahua, Mexico
G	4	Kailie Quinn	5 ft 9 in (1.75 m)	Sr	Judge	Salt Lake City, UT
F	5	Briana Gray	5 ft 10 in (1.78 m)	RS Sr	Nicolet; Bradley	Milwaukee, WI
G	10	Shianne Johnson	5 ft 8 in (1.73 m)	Fr	Killeen	Harker Heights, TX
G	11	Larryn Brooks	5 ft 6 in (1.68 m)	RS Sr	Madison Central; Texas Tech	Richmond, KY
G	12	Zharia Hale	5 ft 10 in (1.78 m)	So	Central Catholic	Portland, OR
G	20	Emily Drake	5 ft 9 in (1.75 m)	Jr	Pullman	Pullman, WA
G	22	Sierra Smith	5 ft 6 in (1.68 m)	Fr	Salesian	Vallejo, CA
F	24	Dominique Williams	6 ft 0 in (1.83 m)	So	Centennial	Meridian, ID
F	25	Audrey Frison	6 ft 1 in (1.85 m)	Sr	David Douglas; Central Arizona	Portland, OR
C	33	Gina O'Brien	6 ft 6 in (1.98 m)	So	Methodist Ladies'	Melbourne, Australia
F	41	Kayla Watkins	6 ft 2 in (1.88 m)	Fr	Glacier Peak	Snohomish, WA

Head coach

- Bethann Ord (UMBC)

Assistant coach(es)

- Devan Newman (Louisville)
- Skyler Young (Western Michigan)
- Matt Thune (Indiana)

Legend

- (C) Team captain
- (S) Suspended
- (I) Ineligible
- (W) Walk-on
- Injured
- Current redshirt

Roster
Last update: December 20, 2017

== Schedule ==
Date time, TV	Rank^{#}	Opponent^{#}	Result	Record	Site (attendance) city, state
Exhibition
11/04/2017*; 1:00 pm		Colorado Mesa	W 79–62		Dee Events Center; Ogden, UT
Non-conference regular season
11/10/2017*; 4:00 pm		Utah Valley; Old Oquirrh Bucket	W 75–57	1–0	Dee Events Center (862); Odgen, UT
11/17/2017*; 7:00 pm		Utah; Old Oquirrh Bucket	L 58–85	1–1	Dee Events Center (686); Odgen, UT
11/20/2017*; 7:00 pm		Antelope Valley	W 80–70	2–1	Dee Events Center (576); Odgen, UT
11/22/2017*; 12:00 pm		Westminster	W 64–58	3–1	Dee Events Center (628); Odgen, UT
11/25/2017*; 12:00 pm		Incarnate Word	W 79–55	4–1	Dee Events Center (523); Odgen, UT
11/30/2017*; 8:00 pm		at Cal State Northridge	W 64–61	5–1	Matadome (356); Northridge, CA
12/02/2017*; 3:00 pm		at No. 10 Oregon	L 87–114	5–2	Matthew Knight Arena (2,506); Eugene, OR
12/07/2017*; 7:00 pm		Pepperdine	W 71–61	6–2	Dee Events Center (746); Odgen, UT
12/09/2017*; 2:00 pm		Air Force	W 62–52	7–2	Dee Events Center (863); Odgen, UT
12/17/2017*; 3:00 pm		at Portland	W 91–70	8–2	Chiles Center (353); Portland, OR
12/20/2017*; 1:00 pm		at Fresno State	L 78–81	8–3	Save Mart Center (1,934); Fresno, CA
Big Sky regular season
12/30/2017; 2:00 pm		at Idaho State	W 76–70	9–3 (1–0)	Reed Gym (880); Pocatello, ID
01/04/2018; 6:30 pm		at Northern Arizona	L 75–76	9–4 (1–1)	Walkup Skydome (203); Flagstaff, AZ
01/06/2018; 12:30 pm		at Southern Utah; Old Oquirrh Bucket	W 77–64	10–4 (2–1)	America First Events Center (714); Cedar City, UT
01/11/2018; 7:00 pm		Northern Colorado	W 82–73	11–4 (3–1)	Dee Events Center (628); Odgen, UT
01/13/2018; 2:00 pm		North Dakota	W 80–69	12–4 (4–1)	Dee Events Center (771); Odgen, UT
01/18/2018; 1:00 pm		at Sacramento State	W 78–56	13–4 (5–1)	Hornets Nest (505); Sacramento, CA
01/20/2018; 2:00 pm		at Portland State	L 64–77	13–5 (5–2)	Pamplin Sports Center (225); Portland, OR
01/27/2018; 2:00 pm		Idaho State	W 84–73	14–5 (6–2)	Dee Events Center (846); Odgen, UT
02/01/2018; 12:00 pm		Southern Utah; Old Oquirrh Bucket	W 65–50	15–5 (7–2)	Dee Events Center (3,146); Odgen, UT
02/03/2018; 2:00 pm		Northern Arizona	W 77–63	16–5 (8–2)	Dee Events Center (789); Odgen, UT
02/08/2018; 6:00 pm		at North Dakota	L 67–80	16–6 (8–3)	Betty Engelstad Sioux Center (1,604); Grand Forks, ND
02/10/2018; 12:00 pm		at Northern Colorado	L 69–71	16–7 (8–4)	Bank of Colorado Arena (1,451); Greeley, CO
02/15/2018; 7:00 pm		Portland State	L 60–62	16–8 (8–5)	Dee Events Center (718); Odgen, UT
02/17/2018; 2:00 pm		Sacramento State	W 86–73	17–8 (9–5)	Dee Events Center (908); Odgen, UT
02/22/2018; 7:00 pm		at Eastern Washington	L 68–77	17–9 (9–6)	Reese Court (653); Cheney, WA
02/24/2018; 3:00 pm		at Idaho	W 105–88	18–9 (10–6)	Cowan Spectrum (515); Moscow, ID
02/28/2018; 7:00 pm		Montana	W 89–73	19–9 (11–6)	Dee Events Center (848); Odgen, UT
03/02/2018; 7:00 pm		Montana State	W 85–69	20–9 (12–6)	Dee Events Center (906); Odgen, UT
Big Sky Women's Tournament
03/07/2018; 3:35 pm	(4)	vs. (5) Idaho State; Quarterfinals	L 109–113 ^{OT}	20–10	Reno Events Center; Reno, NV
WBI
03/15/2018*; 6:00 pm		at Texas Southern; First Round	W 66–56	21–10	H&PE Arena (482); Houston, TX
03/19/2018*; 6:00 pm		at Central Arkansas; Quarterfinals	L 67–82	21–11	Farris Center (2,570); Conway, AR
*Non-conference game. ^{#}Rankings from AP Poll. (#) Tournament seedings in parentheses. All times are in Mountain Time.

== See also ==
2017–18 Weber State Wildcats men's basketball team
