= 2017–18 Montana Lady Griz basketball team =

Intercollegiate basketball season

2017–18 Montana Lady Griz basketball
- Conference: Big Sky Conference
- Record: 14–17 (9–9 Big Sky)
- Head coach: Shannon Schweyen (2nd season)
- Assistant coaches: Sonya Stokken; Mike Petrino; Jordan Sullivan
- Home arena: Dahlberg Arena

2017–18 Big Sky women's basketball standings
	Conf.				Overall
Team	W		L	PCT	W		L	PCT
Northern Colorado †	15	–	3	.833	26	–	7	.788
Idaho	13	–	5	.722	19	–	14	.576
Eastern Washington	12	–	6	.667	17	–	14	.548
Weber State	12	–	6	.667	21	–	11	.656
Idaho State	11	–	7	.611	21	–	11	.656
Portland State	11	–	7	.611	19	–	13	.594
Montana	9	–	9	.500	14	–	17	.452
Montana State	9	–	9	.500	16	–	15	.516
North Dakota	5	–	13	.278	12	–	18	.400
Sacramento State	5	–	13	.278	7	–	23	.233
Northern Arizona	4	–	14	.222	7	–	23	.233
Southern Utah	2	–	16	.111	3	–	27	.100
† 2018 Big Sky tournament winner As of 19 March 2018; Rankings from AP poll

The 2017–18 Montana Lady Griz basketball team represented the University of Montana during the 2017–18 NCAA Division I women's basketball season. The Lady Griz were led by second year head coach Shannon Schweyen, played their home games at Dahlberg Arena and were members of the Big Sky Conference. They finished the season 14–17, 9–9 in Big Sky play to finish in a tie for seventh place. They advanced to the quarterfinals of the Big Sky women's tournament, where they lost to Northern Colorado.

== Roster ==
2017–18 Montana Lady Griz women's basketball team
Players
Coaches

Pos.	#	Name	Height	Year	Previous school	Hometown
G	2	Sophia Stiles	5 ft 9 in (1.75 m)	Fr	Malta HS	Malta, MT
G	3	Gabi Harrington	5 ft 9 in (1.75 m)	So	Bishop Kelly HS	Boise, ID
G	4	Sierra Anderson	5 ft 6 in (1.68 m)	RS Jr	Henry M. Jackson HS	Mill Creek, WA
F	10	Kayleigh Valley	5 ft 11 in (1.8 m)	RS Sr	University HS	Spokane, WA
F	11	Abby Anderson	6 ft 2 in (1.88 m)	Fr	Glencoe HS	Hillsboro, OR
F	12	Nora Klick	6 ft 0 in (1.83 m)	RS Fr	Great Falls HS	Simms, MT
F	13	Alycia Harris	6 ft 3 in (1.91 m)	RS Sr	Stevensville HS	Stevensville, MT
F	14	Hailey Nicholson	6 ft 0 in (1.83 m)	So	Malta HS	Malta, MT
F	22	Mekayla Isaak	6 ft 1 in (1.85 m)	RS Sr	Bend HS	Bend, OR
G	23	Taylor Goligoski	5 ft 8 in (1.73 m)	RS So	Hamilton HS	Hamilton, MT
F	24	Jace Henderson	6 ft 0 in (1.83 m)	RS Jr	Billings Senior HS	Billings, MT
F	30	Caitlin Lonergan	6 ft 2 in (1.88 m)	RS Fr	Bozeman HS	Bozeman, MT
G	32	McKenzie Johnston	5 ft 7 in (1.7 m)	RS So	Capital HS	Helena, MT
G	34	Madi Schoening	5 ft 9 in (1.75 m)	So	Sandpoint HS	Sandpoint, ID
F	44	Emma Stockholm	6 ft 2 in (1.88 m)	So	Chelan HS	Chelan, WA

Head coach

- Shannon Schweyen (Montana)

Assistant coach(es)

- Mike Petrino (Montana State Billings)
- Sonya Stokken (Montana)
- Jordan Sullivan (Montana)

Legend

- (C) Team captain
- (S) Suspended
- (I) Ineligible
- (W) Walk-on
- Injured
- Current redshirt

Roster
Last update: December 21, 2017

== Schedule ==
Date time, TV	Rank^{#}	Opponent^{#}	Result	Record	Site (attendance) city, state
Exhibition
10/30/2017*; 7:00 pm		Carroll (MT)	W 55–48		Dahlberg Arena (2,178); Missoula, MT
11/07/2017*; 7:00 pm		Black Hills State	W 70–46		Dahlberg Arena (2,132); Missoula, MT
Non-conference regular season
11/13/2017*; 6:30 pm		at Wyoming	L 62–67	0–1	Arena-Auditorium (2,484); Laramie, WY
11/16/2017*; 7:00 pm		No. 25 Kentucky	L 54–71	0–2	Dahlberg Arena (2,808); Missoula, MT
11/18/2017*; 7:00 pm		Gonzaga	L 55–70	0–3	Dahlberg Arena (3,520); Missoula, MT
11/23/2017*; 7:00 pm		vs. Indiana State; Cancún Challenge Rivera Division	L 45–57	0–4	Hard Rock Hotel Riviera Maya (982); Cancún, Mexico
11/24/2017*; 7:00 pm		vs. No. 20 Marquette; Cancún Challenge Rivera Division	L 68–87	0–5	Hard Rock Hotel Riviera Maya (982); Cancún, Mexico
12/01/2017*; 7:00 pm		Cal State Fullerton; 37th Lady Griz Classic	W 68–47	1–5	Dahlberg Arena (2,512); Missoula, MT
12/02/2017*; 7:00 pm		Long Beach State; 37th Lady Griz Classic	W 67–60	2–5	Dahlberg Arena (2,455); Missoula, MT
12/07/2017*; 7:00 pm		Stephen F. Austin	W 60–52	3–5	Dahlberg Arena (2,478); Missoula, MT
12/10/2017*; 3:00 pm		at Fresno State	L 58–61	3–6	Save Mart Center (1,872); Fresno, CA
12/13/2017*; 12:00 pm		Seattle	L 64–78	3–7	Dahlberg Arena (7,018); Missoula, MT
12/20/2017*; 7:00 pm		Rocky Mountain (MT)	W 54–38	4–7	Dahlberg Arena (2,173); Missoula, MT
Big Sky regular season
12/28/2017; 7:00 pm		Northern Arizona	W 70–62 ^{OT}	5–7 (1–0)	Dahlberg Arena (2,662); Missoula, MT
12/30/2017; 2:00 pm		Southern Utah	W 81–71	6–7 (2–0)	Dahlberg Arena (2,717); Missoula, MT
01/04/2018; 6:00 pm		at North Dakota	W 54–43	7–7 (3–0)	Betty Engelstad Sioux Center (1,325); Grand Forks, ND
01/06/2018; 2:00 pm		at Northern Colorado	W 68–59	7–8 (3–1)	Bank of Colorado Arena (757); Greeley, CO
01/11/2018; 7:00 pm		Sacramento State	W 68–59	8–8 (4–1)	Dahlberg Arena (2,333); Missoula, MT
01/13/2018; 2:00 pm		Portland State	W 69–53	9–8 (5–1)	Dahlberg Arena (2,866); Missoula, MT
01/20/2018; 2:00 pm, SWX Montana		at Montana State	L 64–81	9–9 (5–2)	Brick Breeden Fieldhouse (4,017); Bozeman, MT
01/25/2018; 6:30 pm		at Southern Utah	W 74–65	10–9 (6–2)	America First Events Center (1,010); Cedar City, UT
01/27/2018; 5:00 pm		at Northern Arizona	W 69–52	11–9 (7–2)	Walkup Skydome (398); Flagstaff, AZ
02/01/2018; 7:00 pm		Northern Colorado	L 58–64	11–10 (7–3)	Dahlberg Arena (3,155); Missoula, MT
02/03/2018; 2:00 pm		North Dakota	W 53–51	12–10 (8–3)	Dahlberg Arena (2,943); Missoula, MT
02/08/2018; 9:00 pm		at Portland State	L 53–70	12–11 (8–4)	Pamplin Sports Center (294); Portland, OR
02/10/2018; 3:00 pm		at Sacramento State	L 64–79	12–12 (8–5)	Hornets Nest (214); Grand Forks, ND
02/15/2018; 7:00 pm		Eastern Washington	L 72–75	12–13 (8–6)	Dahlberg Arena (3,525); Missoula, MT
02/17/2018; 2:00 pm		Idaho	L 56–67	12–14 (8–7)	Dahlberg Arena (3,353); Missoula, MT
02/24/2018; 2:00 pm, SWX Montana		Montana State	W 87–63	13–14 (9–7)	Dahlberg Arena (4,011); Missoula, MT
02/28/2018; 7:00 pm		at Weber State	L 73–89	13–15 (9–8)	Dee Events Center (848); Ogden, UT
03/02/2018; 7:00 pm		at Idaho State	L 60–72	13–16 (9–9)	Reed Gym (1,139); Pocatello, ID
Big Sky Women's Tournament
03/05/2018; 1:05 pm	(9)	vs. (8) Sacramento State; First Round	W 87–80	14–16	Reno Events Center; Reno, NV
03/07/2018; 1:05 pm	(9)	vs. (1) Northern Colorado; Quarterfinals	L 69–78	14–17	Reno Events Center; Reno, NV
*Non-conference game. ^{#}Rankings from AP Poll. (#) Tournament seedings in parentheses. All times are in Mountain Time.

== See also ==
- 2017–18 Montana Grizzlies basketball team
