= 2017–18 Montana State Bobcats women's basketball team =

Intercollegiate basketball season

2017–18 Montana State Bobcats women's basketball
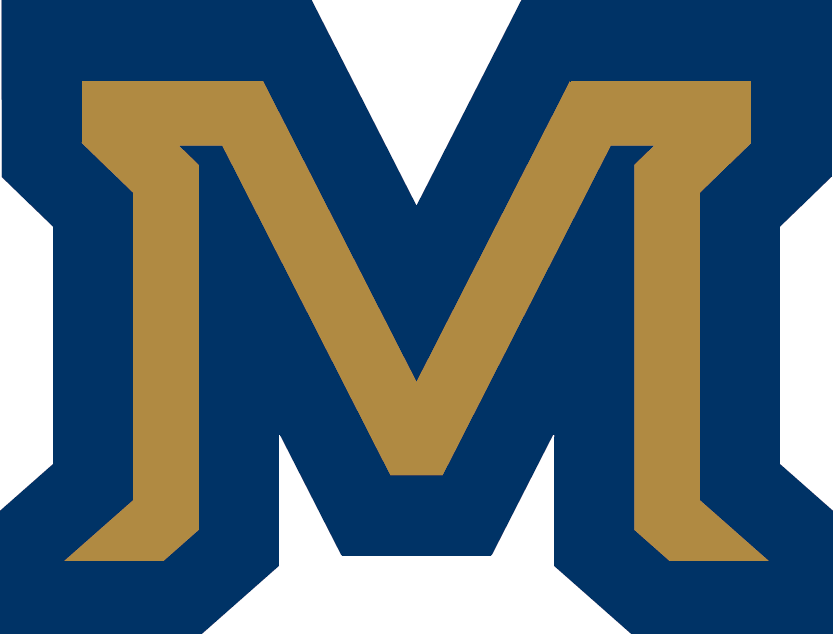
- Conference: Big Sky Conference
- Record: 16–15 (9–9 Big Sky)
- Head coach: Tricia Binford (12th season)
- Associate head coach: Nate Harris
- Assistant coaches: Kati Burrows Mobley; Julian Assibey
- Home arena: Brick Breeden Fieldhouse

2017–18 Big Sky women's basketball standings
	Conf.				Overall
Team	W		L	PCT	W		L	PCT
Northern Colorado †	15	–	3	.833	26	–	7	.788
Idaho	13	–	5	.722	19	–	14	.576
Eastern Washington	12	–	6	.667	17	–	14	.548
Weber State	12	–	6	.667	21	–	11	.656
Idaho State	11	–	7	.611	21	–	11	.656
Portland State	11	–	7	.611	19	–	13	.594
Montana	9	–	9	.500	14	–	17	.452
Montana State	9	–	9	.500	16	–	15	.516
North Dakota	5	–	13	.278	12	–	18	.400
Sacramento State	5	–	13	.278	7	–	23	.233
Northern Arizona	4	–	14	.222	7	–	23	.233
Southern Utah	2	–	16	.111	3	–	27	.100
† 2018 Big Sky tournament winner As of 19 March 2018; Rankings from AP poll

The 2017–18 Montana State Bobcats women's basketball team represented Montana State University during the 2017–18 NCAA Division I women's basketball season. The Bobcats, led by twelfth-year head coach Tricia Binford, played their home games at Brick Breeden Fieldhouse and were members of the Big Sky Conference. They finished the season 16–15, 9–9 in Big Sky play to finish in a tie for seventh place. They advanced to the quarterfinals of the Big Sky women's tournament, where they lost to Idaho.

== Roster ==
2017–18 Montana State Bobcats women's basketball team
Players
Coaches

Pos.	#	Name	Height	Year	Previous school	Hometown
G	2	Tori Martell	5 ft 8 in (1.73 m)	Fr	Somerset	Somerset, WI
G	3	Ashley Van Sickle	5 ft 7 in (1.7 m)	Fr	Ralston Valley	Arvada, CO
G	11	Madisyn Shaide	5 ft 7 in (1.7 m)	So	Big Sky	Missoula, MT
G	12	Delany Junkermier	6 ft 0 in (1.83 m)	Sr	Mead HS	Spokane, WA
F	14	Claire Lundberg	6 ft 1 in (1.85 m)	Sr	Anoka	Andover, MN
F	15	Martha Kuderer	5 ft 11 in (1.8 m)	Jr	Chanhassen	Eden Prairie, MN
G	20	Coral Gillette	6 ft 0 in (1.83 m)	Fr	Bismarck	Bismarck, ND
F	22	Laura Pranger	6 ft 2 in (1.88 m)	Fr	Cherry Creek	Centennial, CO
G	23	Hannah Caudill	5 ft 7 in (1.7 m)	RS Sr	Gonzaga Prep	Spokane, WA
G	24	Oliana Squires	5 ft 8 in (1.73 m)	So	Sand Creek	Colorado Springs, CO
G	30	Rebekah Hatchard	5 ft 8 in (1.73 m)	RS Sr	Windsor Gardens Vocational College; Seward CC	Adelaide, Australia
F	33	Madeline Smith	6 ft 1 in (1.85 m)	So	Snohomish	Snohomish, WA
C	40	Janie Mcrae	6 ft 3 in (1.91 m)	Fr	Shepherd	Shepherd, MT
F	44	Blaire Braxton	6 ft 2 in (1.88 m)	So	Highlands Ranch	Highlands Ranch, CO

Head coach

- Tricia Binford (Boise State)

Assistant coach(es)

- Nate Harris (Montana Tech)
- Kati Burrows Mobley (Montana State)
- Julian Assibey (William Penn)

Legend

- (C) Team captain
- (S) Suspended
- (I) Ineligible
- (W) Walk-on
- Injured
- Current redshirt

Roster
Last update: December 21, 2017

== Schedule ==
Date time, TV	Rank^{#}	Opponent^{#}	Result	Record	Site (attendance) city, state
Exhibition
11/01/2017*; 6:00 pm		Montana Tech	W 86–64		Brick Breeden Fieldhouse; Bozeman, MT
11/03/2017*; 6:00 pm		South Dakota Mines	W 84–55		Brick Breeden Fieldhouse; Bozeman, MT
Non-conference regular season
11/10/2017*; 5:00 pm		at USC	L 47–98	0–1	Galen Center (614); Los Angeles, CA
11/12/2017*; 2:00 pm		at Long Beach State	W 62–51	1–1	Walter Pyramid (623); Long Beach, CA
11/15/2017*; 6:00 pm		Providence (MT)	W 66–31	2–1	Brick Breeden Fieldhouse (848); Bozeman, MT
11/17/2017*; 11:00 am		at Omaha	L 53–64	2–2	Sapp Fieldhouse (1,683); Omaha, NE
11/25/2017*; 2:00 pm		Montana State Billings	W 67–47	3–2	Brick Breeden Fieldhouse (947); Bozeman, MT
11/29/2017*; 11:00 am		Wyoming	W 50–46	4–2	Brick Breeden Fieldhouse (6,012); Bozeman, MT
12/01/2017*; 8:00 pm		vs. Utah State; Maui Classic	W 64–52	5–2	War Memorial Gym; Wailuku, HI
12/02/2017*; 8:00 pm		vs. Nevada; Maui Classic	L 53–67	5–3	War Memorial Gym; Wailuku, HI
12/04/2017*; 10:00 pm		at Hawaii	L 75–81	5–4	Stan Sheriff Center (1,432); Honolulu, HI
12/09/2017*; 4:30 pm, SWX Montana		Stephen F. Austin	W 59–54	6–4	Brick Breeden Fieldhouse (4,077); Bozeman, MT
12/22/2017*; 2:00 pm, BYUtv		at BYU	L 54–75	6–5	Marriott Center (771); Provo, UT
Big Sky regular season
12/28/2017; 7:00 pm		Southern Utah	W 91–71	7–5 (1–0)	Brick Breeden Fieldhouse (1,679); Bozeman, MT
12/30/2017; 2:00 pm		Northern Arizona	W 61–39	8–5 (2–0)	Brick Breeden Fieldhouse (1,636); Bozeman, MT
01/04/2018; 7:00 pm		at Northern Colorado	L 69–82	8–6 (2–1)	Bank of Colorado Arena (869); Greeley, CO
01/06/2018; 1:00 pm		at North Dakota	L 70–79	8–7 (2–2)	Betty Engelstad Sioux Center (1,523); Grand Forks, ND
01/11/2018; 7:00 pm		Portland State	L 60–69	8–8 (2–3)	Brick Breeden Fieldhouse (1,599); Bozeman, MT
01/13/2018; 2:00 pm		Sacramento State	W 85–50	9–8 (3–3)	Brick Breeden Fieldhouse (2,724); Bozeman, MT
01/20/2018; 2:00 pm, SWX Montana		Montana	W 81–64	10–8 (4–3)	Brick Breeden Fieldhouse (4,017); Bozeman, MT
01/25/2017; 6:30 pm		at Northern Arizona	W 78–56	11–8 (5–3)	Walkup Skydome (435); Flagstaff, AZ
01/27/2018; 12:30 pm		at Southern Utah	W 63–57	12–8 (6–3)	America First Events Center (653); Cedar City, UT
02/01/2018; 7:00 pm		North Dakota	W 72–56	13–8 (7–3)	Brick Breeden Fieldhouse (2,026); Bozeman, MT
02/03/2018; 2:00 pm		Northern Colorado	L 63–78	13–9 (7–4)	Brick Breeden Fieldhouse (1,794); Bozeman, MT
02/08/2018; 8:00 pm		at Sacramento State	L 77–88	13–10 (7–5)	Hornets Nest (243); Sacramento, CA
02/10/2018; 2:00 pm		at Portland State	L 53–62	13–11 (7–6)	Pamplin Sports Center (309); Portland, OR
02/15/2018; 7:00 pm		Idaho	L 77–95	13–12 (7–7)	Brick Breeden Fieldhouse (1,720); Bozeman, MT
02/17/2018; 2:00 pm		Eastern Washington	W 77–74	14–12 (8–7)	Brick Breeden Fieldhouse (2,088); Bozeman, MT
02/24/2018; 2:00 pm, SWX Montana		at Montana	L 63–87	14–13 (8–8)	Dahlberg Arena (4,011); Missoula, MT
02/28/2018; 7:00 pm		at Idaho State	W 61–60	15–13 (9–8)	Reed Gym (1,007); Pocatello, ID
03/02/2018; 7:00 pm		at Weber State	L 69–85	15–14 (9–9)	Dee Events Center (906); Ogden, UT
Big Sky Women's Tournament
03/05/2018; 6:35 pm	(7)	vs. (10) North Dakota; First Round	W 68–58	16–14	Reno Events Center; Reno, NV
03/05/2018; 6:35 pm	(7)	vs. (2) Idaho; Quarterfinals	L 74–78	16–15	Reno Events Center; Reno, NV
*Non-conference game. ^{#}Rankings from AP Poll. (#) Tournament seedings in parentheses. All times are in Mountain Time.

== See also ==
- 2017–18 Montana State Bobcats men's basketball team
