= 2017–18 Southern Utah Thunderbirds women's basketball team =

Intercollegiate basketball season

2017–18 Southern Utah Thunderbirds women's basketball
- Conference: Big Sky Conference
- Record: 3–27 (2–16 Big Sky)
- Head coach: Chris Boettcher (4th season)
- Assistant coaches: Dionisio Gomez; Anne Freitas Sabatini; Robert Yonce
- Home arena: America First Events Center

2017–18 Big Sky women's basketball standings
	Conf.				Overall
Team	W		L	PCT	W		L	PCT
Northern Colorado †	15	–	3	.833	26	–	7	.788
Idaho	13	–	5	.722	19	–	14	.576
Eastern Washington	12	–	6	.667	17	–	14	.548
Weber State	12	–	6	.667	21	–	11	.656
Idaho State	11	–	7	.611	21	–	11	.656
Portland State	11	–	7	.611	19	–	13	.594
Montana	9	–	9	.500	14	–	17	.452
Montana State	9	–	9	.500	16	–	15	.516
North Dakota	5	–	13	.278	12	–	18	.400
Sacramento State	5	–	13	.278	7	–	23	.233
Northern Arizona	4	–	14	.222	7	–	23	.233
Southern Utah	2	–	16	.111	3	–	27	.100
† 2018 Big Sky tournament winner As of 19 March 2018; Rankings from AP poll

The 2017–18 Southern Utah Thunderbirds women's basketball team represented Southern Utah University during the 2017–18 NCAA Division I women's basketball season. The Thunderbirds were led by fourth-year head coach Chris Boettcher and play their home games at America First Events Center. They were members of the Big Sky Conference. They finished the season 3–27, 1–15 in Big Sky play to finish in last place. They lost in the first round of the Big Sky women's tournament to Idaho State.

On March 13, Chris Boettcher was fired. He finished at Southern Utah with a 4 year record of 29–92. On April 18, former Saint Mary's assistant coach Tracy Sanders was named the next head coach at Southern Utah.

== Roster ==
2017–18 Southern Utah Thunderbirds women's basketball team
Players
Coaches

Pos.	#	Name	Height	Year	Previous school	Hometown
G	2	Rebecca Cardenas	5 ft 5 in (1.65 m)	So	Burges	El Paso, TX
G/F	4	Ashley Larsen	6 ft 0 in (1.83 m)	RS So	American Fork; Utah Valley	American Fork, UT
G	10	Natalie Sanchez	5 ft 8 in (1.73 m)	Fr	Burges	El Paso, TX
F	11	Megan Kamps	6 ft 0 in (1.83 m)	RS Fr	Manhattan Christian	Manhattan, MT
G/F	12	Chloe Bradford	5 ft 10 in (1.78 m)	So	Minico; Treasure Valley CC	Heyburn, ID
G	14	Breanu Reid	5 ft 7 in (1.7 m)	Jr	Piedmont	Oklahoma City, OK
G	15	Kiana Johnson	5 ft 10 in (1.78 m)	RS So	Northridge; Northern Colorado	Tuscaloosa, AL
G	20	Skylee Doman	5 ft 8 in (1.73 m)	So	Canby	Canby, OR
C	21	Whitney Johnson	6 ft 2 in (1.88 m)	Sr	Lone Peak HS; New Mexico	Highland, UT
F	24	Jessica Chatman (redshirt)	6 ft 0 in (1.83 m)	So	Union; BYU	Ridgefield, WA
G	25	Peyton Torgerson	5 ft 10 in (1.78 m)	Fr	North Sevier	Salina, UT
C	30	Carlie Jones	6 ft 3 in (1.91 m)	Fr	Dallas Christian	Forney, TX
G/F	34	Mo Tapasa (redshirt)	5 ft 7 in (1.7 m)	So	Central; Western Oregon	Monmouth, OR
F	40	Sariah Swallow	6 ft 2 in (1.88 m)	Fr	Millard	Flowell, UT

Head coach

- Chris Boettcher (BYU)

Assistant coach(es)

- Dionisio Gomez (Arkansas)
- Anne Freitas Sabatini
- Robert Yonce (Tennessee)

Legend

- (C) Team captain
- (S) Suspended
- (I) Ineligible
- (W) Walk-on
- Injured
- Current redshirt

Roster
Last update: December 21, 2017

== Schedule and results ==
Date time, TV	Rank^{#}	Opponent^{#}	Result	Record	Site (attendance) city, state
Exhibition
Oct 30, 2017*; 6:30 pm		Northern New Mexico	W 86–67		America First Events Center; Cedar City, UT
Nov 03, 2017*; 5:00 pm		Concordia (Oregon)	W 82–62		America First Events Center; Cedar City, UT
Non-conference regular season
Nov 10, 2017*; 7:00 pm		at BYU; Old Oquirrh Bucket	L 67–75 ^{OT}	0–1	Marriott Center (972); Provo, UT
Nov 14, 2017*; 7:00 pm		at San Diego	L 59–72	0–2	Jenny Craig Pavilion (202); San Diego, CA
Nov 18, 2017*; 7:30 pm		Binghamton	L 66–72	0–3	America First Events Center (480); Cedar City, UT
Nov 21, 2017*; 5:00 pm		Utah State; Old Oquirrh Bucket	W 70–67	1–3	America First Events Center (450); Cedar City, UT
Nov 24, 2017*; 2:00 pm		UC Davis	L 59–85	1–4	America First Events Center (500); Cedar City, UT
Nov 27, 2017*; 6:30 pm		Cal State Bakersfield	L 45–46	1–5	America First Events Center (525); Cedar City, UT
Nov 30, 2017*; 7:00 pm		at Utah Valley; Old Oquirrh Bucket	L 61–69	1–6	Lockhart Arena (319); Orem, UT
Dec 05, 2017*; 12:00 pm		UC Irvine	L 64–71	1–7	America First Events Center (800); Cedar City, UT
Dec 09, 2017*; 3:00 pm		at No. 9 Oregon	L 38–98	1–8	Matthew Knight Arena (2,565); Eugene, OR
Dec 18, 2017*; 2:00 pm		at Grand Canyon	L 54–59	1–9	GCU Arena (247); Phoenix, AZ
Dec 20, 2017*; 7:00 pm		at Arizona	L 74–76 ^{2OT}	1–10	McKale Center (1,215); Tucson, AZ
Big Sky regular season
Dec 28, 2017; 7:00 pm		at Montana State	L 71–91	1–11 (0–1)	Brick Breeden Fieldhouse (1,679); Bozeman, MT
Dec 30, 2017; 2:00 pm		at Montana	L 71–81	1–12 (0–2)	Dahlberg Arena (2,717); Missoula, MT
Jan 04, 2018; 6:30 pm		Idaho State	W 76–70	2–12 (1–2)	America First Events Center (756); Cedar City, UT
Jan 06, 2018; 12:30 pm		Weber State; Old Oquirrh Bucket	L 64–77	2–13 (1–3)	America First Events Center (714); Cedar City, UT
Jan 13, 2018; 5:00 pm		at Northern Arizona	W 75–55	3–13 (2–3)	Walkup Skydome (294); Flagstaff, AZ
Jan 18, 2018; 7:00 pm		at Idaho	L 51–74	3–14 (2–4)	Cowan Spectrum (505); Moscow, ID
Jan 20, 2018; 3:00 pm		at Eastern Washington	L 41–58	3–15 (2–5)	Reese Court (426); Cheney, WA
Jan 25, 2018; 6:30 pm		Montana	L 64–75	3–16 (2–6)	America First Events Center (1,010); Cedar City, UT
Jan 27, 2018; 12:30 pm		Montana State	L 57–63	3–17 (2–7)	America First Events Center (653); Cedar City, UT
Feb 01, 2018; 12:00 pm		at Weber State; Old Oquirrh Bucket	L 50–61	3–18 (2–8)	Dee Events Center (3,146); Ogden, UT
Feb 03, 2018; 2:00 pm		at Idaho State	L 39–66	3–19 (2–9)	Reed Gym (974); Pocatello, ID
Feb 10, 2018; 12:30 pm		Northern Arizona	L 55–72	3–20 (2–10)	America First Events Center (953); Cedar City, UT
Feb 15, 2018; 6:30 pm		North Dakota	L 53–68	3–21 (2–11)	America First Events Center (723); Cedar City, UT
Feb 17, 2018; 12:30 pm		Northern Colorado	L 54–60	3–22 (2–12)	America First Events Center (631); Cedar City, UT
Feb 22, 2018; 9:00 pm		at Portland State	L 66–70	3–23 (2–13)	Pamplin Sports Center (310); Portland, OR
Feb 24, 2018; 3:05 pm		at Sacramento State	L 77–79	3–24 (2–14)	Hornets Nest (373); Sacramento, CA
Feb 28, 2018; 6:30 pm		Eastern Washington	L 49–70	3–25 (2–15)	America First Events Center (1,082); Cedar City, UT
Mar 02, 2018; 6:30 pm		Idaho	L 57–65	3–26 (2–16)	America First Events Center (978); Cedar City, UT
Big Sky Women's Tournament
Mar 05, 2018; 3:35 pm	(12)	vs. (6) Idaho State; First Round	L 49–59	3–27	Reno Events Center; Reno, NV
*Non-conference game. ^{#}Rankings from AP Poll. (#) Tournament seedings in parentheses. All times are in Mountain Time.

== See also ==
- 2017–18 Southern Utah Thunderbirds men's basketball team
