= Pine Springs =

Pine Springs may refer to:

- Pine Springs, Minnesota
- Pine Springs, Texas
- Pine Springs, Ontario
- Pine Springs, Arizona
