= 2017–18 Eastern Washington Eagles women's basketball team =

Intercollegiate basketball season

2017–18 Eastern Washington Eagles women's basketball
- Conference: Big Sky Conference
- Record: 17–14 (12–6 Big Sky)
- Head coach: Wendy Schuller (17th season)
- Assistant coaches: Danielle Mauldin; Bryce Currie; Jodi Page
- Home arena: Reese Court

2017–18 Big Sky women's basketball standings
	Conf.				Overall
Team	W		L	PCT	W		L	PCT
Northern Colorado †	15	–	3	.833	26	–	7	.788
Idaho	13	–	5	.722	19	–	14	.576
Eastern Washington	12	–	6	.667	17	–	14	.548
Weber State	12	–	6	.667	21	–	11	.656
Idaho State	11	–	7	.611	21	–	11	.656
Portland State	11	–	7	.611	19	–	13	.594
Montana	9	–	9	.500	14	–	17	.452
Montana State	9	–	9	.500	16	–	15	.516
North Dakota	5	–	13	.278	12	–	18	.400
Sacramento State	5	–	13	.278	7	–	23	.233
Northern Arizona	4	–	14	.222	7	–	23	.233
Southern Utah	2	–	16	.111	3	–	27	.100
† 2018 Big Sky tournament winner As of 19 March 2018; Rankings from AP poll

The 2017–18 Eastern Washington Eagles Women's basketball team represented Eastern Washington University during the 2017–18 NCAA Division I women's basketball season. The Eagles were led by seventeenth year head coach Wendy Schuller and played their home games at Reese Court. They were members of the Big Sky Conference. They finished the season 17–14, 12–6 in Big Sky play to finish in a tie for third place. They lost in the quarterfinals of the Big Sky women's tournament to Portland State.

== Roster ==
2017–18 Eastern Washington Eagles women's basketball team
Players
Coaches

Pos.	#	Name	Height	Year	Previous school	Hometown
F	0	Lily Perkins	5 ft 11 in (1.8 m)	Fr	Cantwell-Sacred Heart HS	West Covina, CA
F	2	Uriah Howard	5 ft 11 in (1.8 m)	So	Miramonte HS	Oakland, CA
G	3	Symone Starks	5 ft 6 in (1.68 m)	So	Highlands Ranch HS	Lone Tree, CO
G	4	Delaney Hodgins	6 ft 0 in (1.83 m)	Sr	Chiawana HS	Pasco, WA
G	5	Baylee Rexing	5 ft 3 in (1.6 m)	RS So	North Gwinnett HS	Suwanee, GA
F	11	Amy Hartheroad	6 ft 0 in (1.83 m)	RS Fr	Plano West HS	Dallas, TX
G	12	Violet Kapri Morrow	5 ft 8 in (1.73 m)	Jr	Wilson HS	Tacoma, WA
G	13	Lea Wolff	5 ft 5 in (1.65 m)	Fr	Landrat-Lucas Gymnasium	Leverkusen, Germany
G	22	Brittany Klaman	5 ft 11 in (1.8 m)	Fr	Williamstown HS	Melbourne, Australia
F	23	Mariah Cunningham	6 ft 0 in (1.83 m)	Sr	Central Valley HS	Spokane, WA
G	24	Amira Chandler	6 ft 2 in (1.88 m)	Jr	Wenatchee HS	Wenatchee, WA
F	30	Alissa Sealby	6 ft 0 in (1.83 m)	Jr	Wenatchee HS	Wenatchee, WA
C	52	Cailyn Francis	6 ft 3 in (1.91 m)	Fr	River Valley HS	Yuba City, CA
G	54	Andie Easley	5 ft 10 in (1.78 m)	RS So	Horizon HS; Hawai'i	Phoenix, AZ

Head coach

- Wendy Schuller (Fresno Pacific)

Assistant coach(es)

- Danielle Mauldin (Saint Mary's)
- Bryce Currie (Washington)
- Jodi Page (San José State)

Legend

- (C) Team captain
- (S) Suspended
- (I) Ineligible
- (W) Walk-on
- Injured
- Current redshirt

Roster
Last update: December 21, 2017

== Schedule ==
Date time, TV	Rank^{#}	Opponent^{#}	Result	Record	Site (attendance) city, state
Exhibition
11/05/2017*; 5:05 pm		The Master's University	W 87–56		Reese Court; Cheney, WA
Non-conference regular season
11/10/2017*; 7:30 pm		at Fresno State	L 56–81	0–1	Save Mart Center (1,853); Fresno, CA
11/14/2017*; 6:00 pm		at Air Force	W 65–63 ^{OT}	1–1	Clune Arena (342); Colorado Springs, CO
11/17/2017*; 7:05 pm		BYU	L 69–73	1–2	Reese Court (602); Cheney, WA
11/21/2017*; 6:00 pm		at No. 10 Oregon	L 40–81	1–3	Matthew Knight Arena (2,234); Eugene, OR
11/25/2017*; 2:05 pm		Utah Valley	W 61–41	2–3	Reese Court (425); Cheney, WA
11/30/2017*; 6:00 pm, SWX		at Gonzaga	L 45–69	2–4	McCarthey Athletic Center (5,394); Spokane, WA
12/03/2017*; 1:05 pm		Boise State	L 57–61	2–5	Reese Court (552); Cheney, WA
12/08/2017*; 11:05 am		Multnomah	W 88–42	3–5	Reese Court (2,569); Cheney, WA
12/11/2017*; 6:05 pm		Cal Poly	W 75–72	4–5	Reese Court (376); Cheney, WA
12/17/2017*; 9:00 am, BTN		at Purdue; Basketball Travelers Inc. Invitational	L 40–65	4–6	Mackey Arena (6,193); West Lafayette, IN
12/18/2017*; 1:00 pm		vs. Saint Mary's; Basketball Travelers Inc. Invitational	L 56–76	4–7	Mackey Arena; West Lafayette, IN
12/20/2017*; 8:00 am		vs. UT Martin; Basketball Travelers Inc. Invitational	W 61–58	5–7	Mackey Arena; West Lafayette, IN
Big Sky regular season
12/28/2017; 6:05 pm		Northern Colorado	L 65–70	5–8 (0–1)	Reese Court (313); Cheney, WA
12/30/2017; 2:05 pm		North Dakota	W 74–70	6–8 (1–1)	Reese Court (323); Cheney, WA
01/04/2018; 8:00 pm		at Portland State	L 60–75	6–9 (1–2)	Pamplin Sports Center (287); Portland, OR
01/06/2018; 2:05 pm		at Sacramento State	W 83–72	7–9 (2–2)	Hornets Nest (302); Sacramento, CA
01/12/2018; 5:05 pm, SWX		Idaho	W 71–64	8–9 (3–2)	Reese Court (1,137); Cheney, WA
01/18/2018; 6:05 pm		Northern Arizona	W 82–62	9–9 (4–2)	Reese Court (429); Cheney, WA
01/20/2018; 2:05 pm		Southern Utah	W 58–41	10–9 (5–2)	Reese Court (426); Cheney, WA
01/25/2018; 5:00 pm		at North Dakota	L 79–81	10–10 (5–3)	Betty Engelstad Sioux Center (1,594); Grand Forks, ND
01/27/2018; 11:00 am		at Northern Colorado	L 62–68	10–11 (5–4)	Bank of Colorado Arena (893); Greeley, CO
02/01/2018; 6:05 pm		Sacramento State	W 83–76	11–11 (6–4)	Reese Court (332); Cheney, WA
02/03/2018; 2:05 pm		Portland State	W 64–57	12–11 (7–4)	Reese Court (604); Cheney, WA
02/09/2018; 5:00 pm		at Idaho	L 71–85	12–12 (7–5)	Cowan Spectrum; Moscow, ID
02/15/2018; 6:00 pm		at Montana	W 75–72	13–12 (8–5)	Dahlberg Arena (3,525); Missoula, MT
02/17/2018; 1:00 pm		at Montana State	L 74–77	13–13 (8–6)	Brick Breeden Fieldhouse (2,088); Bozeman, MT
02/22/2018; 6:05 pm		Weber State	W 77–68	14–13 (9–6)	Reese Court (653); Cheney, WA
02/24/2018; 2:05 pm		Idaho State	W 66–64	15–13 (10–6)	Reese Court (523); Cheney, WA
02/28/2018; 5:30 pm		at Southern Utah	W 70–49	16–13 (11–6)	America First Events Center (1,082); Cedar City, UT
03/02/2018; 5:30 pm		at Northern Arizona	W 98–83	17–13 (12–6)	Walkup Skydome (555); Flagstaff, AZ
Big Sky Women's Tournament
03/07/2018; 8:05 pm	(3)	vs. (6) Portland State; Quarterfinals	L 73–82	17–14	Reno Events Center; Reno, NV
*Non-conference game. ^{#}Rankings from AP Poll. (#) Tournament seedings in parentheses. All times are in Pacific Time.

== See also ==
2017–18 Eastern Washington Eagles men's basketball team
