= 2017–18 Northern Colorado Bears women's basketball team =

Intercollegiate basketball season

2017–18 Northern Colorado Bears women's basketball
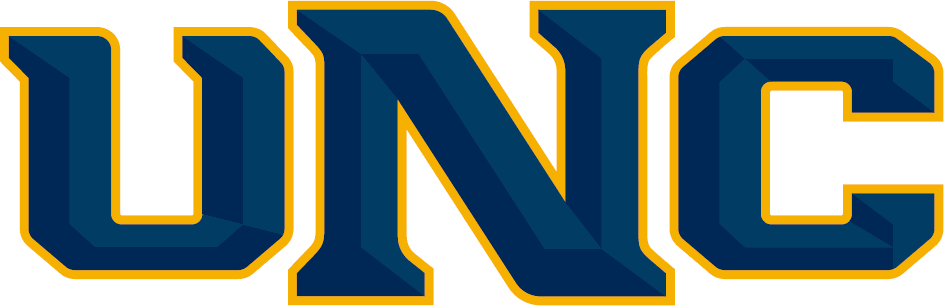

Big Sky Regular season and tournament champions

NCAA women's tournament, first round
- Conference: Big Sky Conference
- Record: 26–7 (15–3 Big Sky)
- Head coach: Kamie Ethridge (4th season)
- Assistant coaches: Kelly Moylan; Laurie Koehn; Katie Shepard
- Home arena: Bank of Colorado Arena

2017–18 Big Sky women's basketball standings
| | Conf. | | | | Overall |
| Team | W | | L | PCT | W | | L | PCT |
|---|---|---|---|---|---|---|---|---|
| Northern Colorado † | 15 | – | 3 | .833 | 26 | – | 7 | .788 |
| Idaho | 13 | – | 5 | .722 | 19 | – | 14 | .576 |
| Eastern Washington | 12 | – | 6 | .667 | 17 | – | 14 | .548 |
| Weber State | 12 | – | 6 | .667 | 21 | – | 11 | .656 |
| Idaho State | 11 | – | 7 | .611 | 21 | – | 11 | .656 |
| Portland State | 11 | – | 7 | .611 | 19 | – | 13 | .594 |
| Montana | 9 | – | 9 | .500 | 14 | – | 17 | .452 |
| Montana State | 9 | – | 9 | .500 | 16 | – | 15 | .516 |
| North Dakota | 5 | – | 13 | .278 | 12 | – | 18 | .400 |
| Sacramento State | 5 | – | 13 | .278 | 7 | – | 23 | .233 |
| Northern Arizona | 4 | – | 14 | .222 | 7 | – | 23 | .233 |
| Southern Utah | 2 | – | 16 | .111 | 3 | – | 27 | .100 |
† 2018 Big Sky tournament winner As of 19 March 2018; Rankings from AP poll

The 2017–18 Northern Colorado Bears women's basketball team represented the University of Northern Colorado during the 2017–18 NCAA Division I women's basketball season. The Bears were led by fourth year head coach Kamie Ethridge, played their home games at the Bank of Colorado Arena as members of the Big Sky Conference. They finished the season 26–7, 15–3 in Big Sky play to win the Big Sky regular season championship. They defeated Montana, Idaho State, and Idaho to win the Big Sky women's tournament for the first time in program history. As a result, they received the conference's automatic bid to the NCAA women's tournament, the school's first. As the No. 10 seed in the Lexington region, they lost to Michigan in the first round.

Ethridge left Northern Colorado on April 16 after four seasons for Washington State. On April 30, former UCLA assistant head coach Jennifer Roulier-Huth was named the new head coach for the Bears.

== Roster ==
2017–18 Northern Colorado Bears women's basketball team
Players
Coaches

| Pos. | # | Name | Height | Year | Previous school | Hometown |
|---|---|---|---|---|---|---|
| G | 0 | Tiarna Clarke | 5 ft 7 in (1.7 m) | Fr | | Albany, New Zealand |
| G | 1 | Krystal Leger-Walker | 5 ft 9 in (1.75 m) | So | | Waikato, New Zealand |
| G | 2 | Savannah Scott | 5 ft 7 in (1.7 m) | Sr | Westmont HS | Campbell, CA |
| G | 4 | Kirsten Kramer | 5 ft 8 in (1.73 m) | Jr | Clark HS | San Antonio, TX |
| G | 10 | Savannah Smith | 5 ft 6 in (1.68 m) | RS Jr | Fossil Ridge HS | Fort Collins, CO |
| C | 13 | Courtney Smith | 6 ft 3 in (1.91 m) | Jr | Legacy HS | Thoronton, CO |
| G | 20 | Alexis Chapman | 5 ft 7 in (1.7 m) | Fr | | Garland, TX |
| G | 21 | Abby Kain | 6 ft 1 in (1.85 m) | So | Simley HS | Inver Grove Heights, MN |
| F/C | 24 | Ali Meyer | 6 ft 1 in (1.85 m) | RS Jr | Palmer Ridge HS; Colorado Christian | Monument, CO |
| G | 33 | Kianna Williams | 5 ft 9 in (1.75 m) | Sr | Lake Elsinore HS | Perris, CA |
| C | 44 | Bridget Hintz | 6 ft 3 in (1.91 m) | So | Elk Rapids HS | Elk Rapids, MI |

Head coach

- Kamie Ethridge (Texas)

Assistant coach(es)

- Kelly Moylan (Kansas State)
- Laurie Koehn (Kansas State)
- Katie Shepard (Sacred Heart)

Legend

- (C) Team captain
- (S) Suspended
- (I) Ineligible
- (W) Walk-on
- Injured
- Current redshirt

Roster
Last update: December 21, 2017

== Schedule and results ==
| Date time, TV | Rank^{#} | Opponent^{#} | Result | Record | Site (attendance) city, state |
Exhibition
| Oct 31, 2017*; 7:00 pm | | CSU–Pueblo | W 68–51 | | Bank of Colorado Arena; Greeley, CO |
Non-conference regular season
| Nov 10, 2017*; 6:00 pm | | at No. 25 DePaul | W 94–88 | 1–0 | McGrath-Phillips Arena (1,665); Chicago, IL |
| Nov 12, 2017*; 1:00 pm, ALT | | at Denver | W 71–63 | 2–0 | Magness Arena; Denver, CO |
| Nov 15, 2017*; 7:00 pm | | LSU | W 58–50 | 3–0 | Bank of Colorado Arena (1,180); Greeley, CO |
| Nov 19, 2017*; 2:00 pm | | San Francisco | W 73–60 | 4–0 | Bank of Colorado Arena (608); Greeley, CO |
| Nov 22, 2017*; 11:00 am | | at Quinnipiac | L 49–60 | 4–1 | TD Bank Sports Center (604); Hamden, CT |
| Nov 24, 2017*; 5:00 pm | | at Fordham | L 33–48 | 4–2 | Rose Hill Gymnasium (259); Bronx, NY |
| Nov 30, 2017*; 7:00 pm | | BYU | W 79–74 | 5–2 | Bank of Colorado Arena (753); Greeley, CO |
| Dec 03, 2017*; 2:00 pm | | Pacific | W 80–55 | 6–2 | Bank of Colorado Arena; Greeley, CO |
| Dec 10, 2017*; 2:00 pm | | Colorado State | L 44–55 | 6–3 | Bank of Colorado Arena (986); Greeley, CO |
| Dec 19, 2017*; 12:00 pm | | at UMKC; Roo Holiday Classic | W 88–73 | 7–3 | Swinney Recreation Center (222); Kansas City, MO |
| Dec 20, 2017*; 12:00 pm | | vs. Liberty; Roo Holiday Classic | W 65–57 | 8–3 | Swinney Recreation Center (113); Kansas City, MO |
Big Sky regular season
| Dec 28, 2017; 7:00 pm | | at Eastern Washington | W 70–65 | 9–3 (1–0) | Reese Court (313); Cheney, WA |
| Dec 30, 2017; 3:00 pm | | at Idaho | W 78–72 | 10–3 (2–0) | Cowan Spectrum (380); Moscow, ID |
| Jan 04, 2018; 7:00 pm, CET | | Montana State | W 82–69 | 11–3 (3–0) | Bank of Colorado Arena (869); Greeley, CO |
| Jan 06, 2018; 2:00 pm | | Montana | W 68–50 | 12–3 (4–0) | Bank of Colorado Arena (757); Greeley, CO |
| Jan 11, 2018; 7:00 pm | | at Weber State | L 73–82 | 12–4 (4–1) | Dee Events Center (628); Ogden, UT |
| Jan 13, 2018; 2:00 pm | | at Idaho State | W 63–57 | 13–4 (5–1) | Reed Gym (1,037); Pocatello, ID |
| Jan 20, 2018; 1:00 pm | | at North Dakota | L 70–78 | 13–5 (5–2) | Betty Engelstad Sioux Center (1,877); Grand Forks, ND |
| Jan 25, 2017; 7:00 pm | | Idaho | L 71–79 | 13–6 (5–3) | Bank of Colorado Arena (772); Greeley, CO |
| Jan 27, 2018; 12:00 pm | | Eastern Washington | W 68–62 | 14–6 (6–3) | Bank of Colorado Arena (893); Greeley, CO |
| Feb 01, 2018; 7:00 pm | | at Montana | W 64–58 | 15–6 (7–3) | Dahlberg Arena (3,155); Missoula, MT |
| Feb 03, 2018; 2:00 pm | | at Montana State | W 78–63 | 16–6 (8–3) | Brick Breeden Fieldhouse (1,794); Bozeman, MT |
| Feb 08, 2018; 12:00 pm | | Idaho State | W 75–52 | 17–6 (9–3) | Bank of Colorado Arena (2,714); Greeley, CO |
| Feb 10, 2018; 12:00 pm, CET | | Weber State | W 71–69 | 18–6 (0–3) | Bank of Colorado Arena (1,451); Greeley, CO |
| Feb 15, 2018; 6:30 pm | | at Northern Arizona | W 85–63 | 19–6 (11–3) | Walkup Skydome (225); Flagstaff, AZ |
| Feb 17, 2018; 12:30 pm | | at Southern Utah | W 60–54 | 20–6 (12–3) | America First Events Center (631); Cedar City, UT |
| Feb 24, 2018; 2:00 pm | | North Dakota | W 51–45 | 21–6 (13–3) | Bank of Colorado Arena (1,232); Greeley, CO |
| Feb 28, 2018; 7:00 pm | | Portland State | W 63–60 | 22–6 (14–3) | Bank of Colorado Arena (1,356); Greeley, CO |
| Mar 02, 2018; 7:00 pm | | Sacramento State | W 90–68 | 23–6 (15–3) | Bank of Colorado Arena (1,473); Greeley, CO |
Big Sky Women's Tournament
| Mar 07, 2018; 1:05 pm | (1) | vs. (8) Montana; Quarterfinals | W 78–69 | 24–6 | Reno Events Center; Reno, NV |
| Mar 09, 2018; 1:05 pm, ELVN | (1) | vs. (5) Idaho State; Semifinals | W 73–66 | 25–6 | Reno Events Center; Reno, NV |
| Mar 10, 2018; 1:05 pm, ELVN | (1) | vs. (2) Idaho; Championship Game | W 91–69 | 26–6 | Reno Events Center; Reno, NV |
NCAA Women's Tournament
| Mar 16, 2018*; 3:00 pm, ESPN2 | (10 L) | vs. (7 L) Michigan; First round | L 61–75 | 26–7 | Ferrell Center; Waco, TX |
*Non-conference game. ^{#}Rankings from AP Poll. (#) Tournament seedings in parentheses. L=Lexington Region. All times are in Mountain Time.

== Rankings ==
2017–18 NCAA Division I women's basketball rankings

Regular season Polls
| Poll | Pre- season | Week 2 | Week 3 | Week 4 | Week 5 | Week 6 | Week 7 | Week 8 | Week 9 | Week 10 | Week 11 | Week 12 | Week 13 | Week 14 | Week 15 | Week 16 | Week 17 | Week 18 | Week 19 | Final |
|---|---|---|---|---|---|---|---|---|---|---|---|---|---|---|---|---|---|---|---|---|
| AP | NR | NR | RV | NR | NR | NR | NR | NR | NR | NR | | | | | | | | | | N/A |
| Coaches | NR | N/A | RV | NR | NR | NR | NR | NR | NR | NR | | | | | | | | | | |

Legend
| | Increase in ranking |
| | Decrease in ranking |
| | No change |
| (RV) | Received votes |
| (NR) | Not ranked |

== See also ==
- 2017–18 Northern Colorado Bears men's basketball team
