= 2017–18 North Dakota Fighting Hawks women's basketball team =

Intercollegiate basketball season

2017–18 North Dakota Fighting Hawks women's basketball
- Conference: Big Sky Conference
- Record: 12–18 (5–13 Big Sky)
- Head coach: Travis Brewster (6th season)
- Assistant coaches: Adam Jacobson; Mallory Bernhard; Katelin Oney
- Home arena: Betty Engelstad Sioux Center

2017–18 Big Sky women's basketball standings
	Conf.				Overall
Team	W		L	PCT	W		L	PCT
Northern Colorado †	15	–	3	.833	26	–	7	.788
Idaho	13	–	5	.722	19	–	14	.576
Eastern Washington	12	–	6	.667	17	–	14	.548
Weber State	12	–	6	.667	21	–	11	.656
Idaho State	11	–	7	.611	21	–	11	.656
Portland State	11	–	7	.611	19	–	13	.594
Montana	9	–	9	.500	14	–	17	.452
Montana State	9	–	9	.500	16	–	15	.516
North Dakota	5	–	13	.278	12	–	18	.400
Sacramento State	5	–	13	.278	7	–	23	.233
Northern Arizona	4	–	14	.222	7	–	23	.233
Southern Utah	2	–	16	.111	3	–	27	.100
† 2018 Big Sky tournament winner As of 19 March 2018; Rankings from AP poll

The 2017–18 North Dakota Fighting Hawks women's basketball team represented the University of North Dakota during the 2017–18 NCAA Division I women's basketball season. The Fighting Hawks, led by sixth-year head coach Travis Brewster, played their home games at the Betty Engelstad Sioux Center. They were members of the Big Sky Conference. They finished the season 12–18, 5–13 in Big Sky play to finish in a tie for ninth place. They lost in the first round of the Big Sky women's tournament to Montana State.

This season was the last for North Dakota as a full Big Sky member. On July 1, 2018, the school joined the Summit League in all sports except for football, in which it remained a Big Sky member before joining the Missouri Valley Football Conference in 2020.

== Roster ==
2017–18 North Dakota Fighting Hawks women's basketball team
Players
Coaches

Pos.	#	Name	Height	Year	Previous school	Hometown
G	0	Chastity Franklin	5 ft 8 in (1.73 m)	Sr	Cardinal Ritter HS; Johnson County CC	St. Louis, MO
G	3	Melissa Dailey	5 ft 8 in (1.73 m)	Jr	Centennial HS; College of the Siskiyous	Portland, OR
G	4	Jill Morton	5 ft 9 in (1.75 m)	Jr	Edina HS	Edina, MN
C	5	Melissa Leet	6 ft 5 in (1.96 m)	Fr	Portage HS	Portage, WI
G	11	Grace Sawatzke	5 ft 9 in (1.75 m)	RS Jr	Monticello HS	Monticello, MN
C	15	Faith Dooley	6 ft 3 in (1.91 m)	Jr	Central Cass HS	Wheatland, ND
G	20	Mikayla Reinke	5 ft 9 in (1.75 m)	Fr	Kindred HS	Kindred, ND
G	21	Megan Dailey	5 ft 8 in (1.73 m)	Jr	Centennial HS; College of the Siskiyous	Portland, OR
G	22	Bailey Strand	5 ft 10 in (1.78 m)	RS Jr	Kennedy Secondary	Fergus Falls, MN
G	23	Kaila Burroughs	6 ft 1 in (1.85 m)	RS Jr	St. Cloud Tech; Denver	St. Cloud, MN
F	24	Julia Fleecs	6 ft 2 in (1.88 m)	Fr	Glidden-Ralston Jr.-Sr.	Glidden, IA
F	32	Akealy Moton	6 ft 0 in (1.83 m)	Fr	West Fargo HS	West Fargo, ND
F	34	Lexi Klabo	6 ft 2 in (1.88 m)	Jr	Davies HS	Fargo, ND
F	35	Fallyn Freije	6 ft 0 in (1.83 m)	Jr	Lakota-Edmore HS	Edmore, ND

Head coach

- Travis Brewster (Charleston Southern)

Assistant coach(es)

- Adam Jacobson (North Dakota)
- Mallory Bernhard (North Dakota)
- Katelin Oney (Northern Iowa)

Legend

- (C) Team captain
- (S) Suspended
- (I) Ineligible
- (W) Walk-on
- Injured
- Current redshirt

Roster

== Schedule ==
Date time, TV	Rank^{#}	Opponent^{#}	Result	Record	Site (attendance) city, state
Exhibition
11/04/2017*; 2:00 pm		Minnesota–Morris	W 99–35		Betty Engelstad Sioux Center (1,457); Grand Forks, ND
Non-conference regular season
11/10/2017*; 4:00 pm		at No. 19 Oregon State	L 55–65	0–1	Gill Coliseum (3,737); Corvallis, OR
11/15/2017*; 7:00 pm, MidcoSN2		at South Dakota State	L 52–66	0–2	Frost Arena (1,646); Brookings, SD
11/19/2017*; 2:00 pm, FSNOR/FSCP		UMass	W 82–52	1–2	Betty Engelstad Sioux Center (1,580); Grand Forks, ND
11/24/2017*; 2:00 pm		vs. Lamar; UTSA Thanksgiving Classic	W 73–70	2–2	Convocation Center (150); San Antonio, TX
11/25/2017*; 3:30 pm		at UTSA; UTSA Thanksgiving Classic	W 60–47	3–2	Convocation Center (328); San Antonio, TX
12/02/2017*; 2:00 pm, FSNOR/FSCP		Northern Iowa	W 80–72	4–2	Betty Engelstad Sioux Center (1,877); Grand Forks, ND
12/05/2017*; 7:00 pm		at No. 8 Baylor	L 43–105	4–3	Ferrell Center (4,788); Waco, TX
12/09/2017*; 2:00 pm, MidcoSN/FCSC		North Dakota State	W 79–68	5–3	Betty Engelstad Sioux Center (2,571); Grand Forks, ND
12/12/2017*; 7:00 pm		Mayville State	W 82–64	6–3	Betty Engelstad Sioux Center (1,358); Grand Forks, ND
12/18/2017*; 7:00 pm		Southwest Minnesota State	W 85–62	7–3	Betty Engelstad Sioux Center (1,249); Grand Forks, ND
12/21/2017*; 5:00 pm, MidcoSN		at South Dakota	L 71–76	7–4	Sanford Coyote Sports Center (1,732); Vermillion, SD
Big Sky regular season
12/28/2017; 7:00 pm		at Idaho	L 75–80	7–5 (0–1)	Cowan Spectrum (312); Moscow, ID
12/30/2017; 4:00 pm		at Eastern Washington	L 70–74	7–6 (0–2)	Reese Court (323); Cheney, WA
01/04/2018; 7:00 pm		Montana	L 43–54	7–7 (0–3)	Betty Engelstad Sioux Center (1,325); Grand Forks, ND
01/06/2018; 2:00 pm, MidcoSN		Montana State	W 79–70	8–7 (1–3)	Betty Engelstad Sioux Center (1,523); Grand Forks, ND
01/11/2018; 8:00 pm		at Idaho State	L 46–57	8–8 (1–4)	Reed Gym (1,111); Pocatello, ID
01/13/2018; 3:00 pm		at Weber State	L 69–80	8–9 (1–5)	Dee Events Center (771); Ogden, UT
01/20/2018; 2:00 pm		Northern Colorado	W 78–70	9–9 (2–5)	Betty Engelstad Sioux Center (1,877); Grand Forks, ND
01/25/2018; 7:00 pm		Eastern Washington	W 81–79	10–9 (3–5)	Betty Engelstad Sioux Center (1,594); Grand Forks, ND
01/27/2018; 1:00 pm		Idaho	L 64–78	10–10 (3–6)	Betty Engelstad Sioux Center (1,935); Grand Forks, ND
02/01/2018; 8:00 pm		at Montana State	L 56–72	10–11 (3–7)	Brick Breeden Fieldhouse (2,026); Bozeman, MT
02/03/2018; 3:00 pm		at Montana	L 51–53	10–12 (3–8)	Dahlberg Arena (2,943); Missoula, MT
02/08/2018; 7:00 pm, MidcoSN		Weber State	W 80–67	11–12 (4–8)	Betty Engelstad Sioux Center (1,604); Grand Forks, ND
02/10/2018; 2:00 pm, MidcoSN		Idaho State	L 55–68	11–13 (4–9)	Betty Engelstad Sioux Center (1,977); Grand Forks, ND
02/15/2018; 7:30 pm		at Southern Utah	W 68–53	12–13 (5–9)	America First Events Center (723); Cedar City, UT
02/17/2018; 6:00 pm		at Northern Arizona	L 59–79	12–14 (5–10)	Walkup Skydome (427); Flagstaff, AZ
02/24/2018; 3:00 pm		at Northern Colorado	L 45–51	12–15 (5–11)	Bank of Colorado Arena (1,232); Greeley, CO
02/28/2018; 7:00 pm, MidcoSN		Sacramento State	L 66–72	12–16 (5–12)	Betty Engelstad Sioux Center (1,552); Grand Forks, ND
03/02/2018; 3:00 pm		Portland State	L 61–80	12–17 (5–13)	Betty Engelstad Sioux Center (1,601); Grand Forks, ND
Big Sky tournament
03/05/2018; 7:35 pm	(10)	vs. (7) Montana State; First Round	L 58–68	12–28	Reno Events Center; Reno, NV
*Non-conference game. ^{#}Rankings from AP Poll. (#) Tournament seedings in parentheses. All times are in Central Time.

== See also ==
- 2017–18 North Dakota Fighting Hawks men's basketball team
