= 2017–18 Idaho Vandals women's basketball team =

Intercollegiate basketball season

2017–18 Idaho Vandals women's basketball

WNIT, First Round
- Conference: Big Sky Conference
- Record: 19–14 (13–5 Big Sky)
- Head coach: Jon Newlee (10th season)
- Assistant coaches: Christa Stanford; Jeri Jacobson
- Home arena: Cowan Spectrum; Memorial Gym

2017–18 Big Sky women's basketball standings
| | Conf. | | | | Overall |
| Team | W | | L | PCT | W | | L | PCT |
|---|---|---|---|---|---|---|---|---|
| Northern Colorado † | 15 | – | 3 | .833 | 26 | – | 7 | .788 |
| Idaho | 13 | – | 5 | .722 | 19 | – | 14 | .576 |
| Eastern Washington | 12 | – | 6 | .667 | 17 | – | 14 | .548 |
| Weber State | 12 | – | 6 | .667 | 21 | – | 11 | .656 |
| Idaho State | 11 | – | 7 | .611 | 21 | – | 11 | .656 |
| Portland State | 11 | – | 7 | .611 | 19 | – | 13 | .594 |
| Montana | 9 | – | 9 | .500 | 14 | – | 17 | .452 |
| Montana State | 9 | – | 9 | .500 | 16 | – | 15 | .516 |
| North Dakota | 5 | – | 13 | .278 | 12 | – | 18 | .400 |
| Sacramento State | 5 | – | 13 | .278 | 7 | – | 23 | .233 |
| Northern Arizona | 4 | – | 14 | .222 | 7 | – | 23 | .233 |
| Southern Utah | 2 | – | 16 | .111 | 3 | – | 27 | .100 |
† 2018 Big Sky tournament winner As of 19 March 2018; Rankings from AP poll

The 2017–18 Idaho Vandals women's basketball team represented the University of Idaho during the 2017–18 NCAA Division I women's basketball season. The Vandals, led by tenth year head coach Jon Newlee, played their home games at the Cowan Spectrum with early season games at Memorial Gym, and are members of the Big Sky Conference. They finished the season 19–14, 13–5 in Big Sky play to finish in second place. They advanced to the championship game of the Big Sky women's tournament, where they lost to Northern Colorado. They received an automatic bid to the Women's National Invitation Tournament, where they lost to UC Davis in the first round.

== Roster ==
2017–18 Idaho Vandals women's basketball team
Players
Coaches

| Pos. | # | Name | Height | Year | Previous school | Hometown |
|---|---|---|---|---|---|---|
| G | 1 | Jenae Lewallen | 5 ft 8 in (1.73 m) | So | Liberty HS | Surprise, AZ |
| F | 3 | Nina Carlson | 6 ft 3 in (1.91 m) | Fr | Lake City | Post Falls, ID |
| G | 10 | Sarah Bersang | 5 ft 6 in (1.68 m) | Jr | Eastern Wyoming | Horsens, Denmark |
| C | 11 | Isabelle Hadden | 6 ft 4 in (1.93 m) | So | Boise | Boise, ID |
| C | 12 | Nejra Solo | 6 ft 5 in (1.96 m) | RS Sr | PRVA Gimnazija Zenica | Zenica, Bosnia |
| G | 13 | Haley Blankinship | 5 ft 7 in (1.7 m) | Fr | West Springfield | Springfield, VA |
| G | 14 | Taylor Pierce | 5 ft 7 in (1.7 m) | Jr | La Costa Canyon HS | Carlsbad, CA |
| G | 20 | Allison Kirby | 5 ft 7 in (1.7 m) | Fr | Timberlake | Spirit Lake, ID |
| G | 21 | Mikayla Ferenz | 5 ft 10 in (1.78 m) | Jr | Walla Walla HS | Walla Walla, WA |
| G/F | 31 | Geraldine McCorkell | 6 ft 0 in (1.83 m) | Sr | Penleigh & Essendon Grammar | Melbourne, Australia |
| C | 42 | Natalie Klinker | 6 ft 1 in (1.85 m) | Fr | Fairfield | Fairfield, MT |

Head coach

- Jon Newlee (San Diego State)

Assistant coach(es)

- Christa Stanford (Idaho State)
- Jeri Jacobson (Upper Iowa)

Legend

- (C) Team captain
- (S) Suspended
- (I) Ineligible
- (W) Walk-on
- Injured
- Current redshirt

Roster
Last update: December 21, 2017

== Schedule ==
| Date time, TV | Rank^{#} | Opponent^{#} | Result | Record | Site (attendance) city, state |
Exhibition
| 11/05/2017*; 2:00 pm | | Lewis–Clark State (Idaho) | W 82–67 | | Memorial Gym; Moscow, ID |
Non-conference regular season
| 11/10/2017*; 4:30 pm | | at Colorado State | W 82–69 | 1–0 | Moby Arena (1,663); Fort Collins, CO |
| 11/15/2017*; 4:00 pm | | at No. 9 Ohio State | L 56–99 | 1–1 | Value City Arena (3,960); Columbus, OH |
| 11/18/2017*; 12:00 pm | | at Abilene Christian | L 72–82 | 1–2 | Moody Coliseum (1,181); Abilene, TX |
| 11/24/2017*; 7:30 pm | | at Cal State Northridge; Warner Center Marriott Thanksgiving Basketball Classic | W 80–75 | 2–2 | Matadome (556); Northridge, CA |
| 11/25/2017*; 7:30 pm | | vs. TCU; Warner Center Marriott Thanksgiving Basketball Classic | L 76–86 | 2–3 | Matadome (411); Northridge, CA |
| 12/01/2017*; 6:00 pm | | Washington | L 69–81 | 2–4 | Memorial Gym (667); Moscow, ID |
| 12/04/2017*; 6:00 pm | | Cal State Fullerton | W 80–60 | 3–4 | Memorial Gym (347); Moscow, ID |
| 12/09/2017*; 6:00 pm | | Wyoming | L 64–70 | 3–5 | Memorial Gym (454); Moscow, ID |
| 12/15/2017*; 5:00 pm | | Seattle | L 60–68 | 3–6 | Cowan Spectrum (719); Moscow, ID |
| 12/18/2017*; 5:00 pm | | at Arizona State | L 33–77 | 3–7 | Wells Fargo Arena (1,723); Tempe, AZ |
| 12/21/2017*; 4:00 pm | | vs. Eastern Oregon; Boise Showcase | W 84–70 | 4–7 | CenturyLink Arena; Boise, ID |
Big Sky regular season
| 12/28/2017; 6:00 pm | | North Dakota | W 80–75 | 5–7 (1–0) | Cowan Spectrum (312); Moscow, ID |
| 12/30/2017; 2:00 pm | | Northern Colorado | L 72–78 | 5–8 (1–1) | Cowan Spectrum (380); Moscow, ID |
| 01/04/2018; 7:05 pm | | at Sacramento State | L 64–79 | 5–9 (1–2) | Hornets Nest (156); Sacramento, CA |
| 01/06/2018; 1:00 pm | | at Portland State | W 101–90 | 6–9 (2–2) | Pamplin Sports Center (352); Portland, OR |
| 01/12/2018; 5:00 pm, SWX | | at Eastern Washington | L 64–71 | 6–10 (2–3) | Reese Court (1,137); Cheney, WA |
| 01/18/2018; 6:00 pm | | Southern Utah | W 74–51 | 7–10 (3–3) | Cowan Spectrum (444); Moscow, ID |
| 01/20/2018; 2:00 pm | | Northern Arizona | W 83–68 | 8–10 (4–3) | Cowan Spectrum (505); Moscow, ID |
| 01/25/2018; 6:00 pm | | at Northern Colorado | W 79–71 | 9–10 (5–3) | Bank of Colorado Arena (772); Greeley, CO |
| 01/27/2018; 12:00 pm | | at North Dakota | W 78–64 | 10–10 (6–3) | Betty Engelstad Sioux Center (1,935); Grand Forks, ND |
| 02/01/2018; 6:00 pm | | Portland State | W 61–60 | 11–10 (7–3) | Cowan Spectrum (445); Moscow, ID |
| 02/03/2018; 2:00 pm | | Sacramento State | W 101–66 | 12–10 (8–3) | Cowan Spectrum (419); Moscow, ID |
| 02/09/2018; 5:00 pm | | Eastern Washington | W 85–71 | 13–10 (9–3) | Cowan Spectrum; Moscow, ID |
| 02/15/2018; 6:00 pm | | at Montana State | W 95–77 | 14–10 (10–3) | Brick Breeden Fieldhouse (1,720); Bozeman, MT |
| 02/17/2018; 1:00 pm | | at Montana | W 67–56 | 15–10 (11–3) | Dahlberg Arena (3,353); Missoula, MT |
| 02/22/2018; 6:00 pm | | Idaho State | L 52–62 | 15–11 (11–4) | Cowan Spectrum (416); Moscow, ID |
| 02/24/2018; 2:00 pm | | Weber State | L 88–105 | 15–12 (11–5) | Cowan Spectrum (515); Moscow, ID |
| 02/28/2018; 5:30 pm | | at Northern Arizona | W 93–83 | 16–12 (12–5) | Walkup Skydome (253); Flagstaff, AZ |
| 03/02/2018; 5:30 pm | | at Southern Utah | W 65–57 | 17–12 (13–5) | America First Events Center (978); Cedar City, UT |
Big Sky Women's Tournament
| 03/07/2018; 6:35 pm | (2) | vs. (7) Montana State; Quarterfinals | W 78–74 | 18–12 | Reno Events Center; Reno, NV |
| 03/09/2018; 2:35 pm, ELVN | (2) | vs. (6) Portland State; Semifinals | W 102–99 | 19–12 | Reno Events Center; Reno, NV |
| 03/10/2018; 12:05 pm, ELVN | (2) | vs. (1) Northern Colorado; Championship Game | L 69–91 | 19–13 | Reno Events Center; Reno, NV |
WNIT
| 03/15/2018*; 6:00 pm | | at UC Davis; First Round | L 62–82 | 19–14 | The Pavilion (1,382); Davis, CA |
*Non-conference game. ^{#}Rankings from AP Poll. (#) Tournament seedings in parentheses. All times are in Pacific Time.

== See also ==
2017–18 Idaho Vandals men's basketball team
