= 2018 Big Sky Conference women's basketball tournament =

- Classification: Division I
- Season: 2017–18
- Teams: 12
- Site: Reno Events Center; Reno, NV
- Champions: Northern Colorado (1st title)
- Winning coach: Kamie Ethridge (1st title)
- MVP: Savannah Smith (Northern Colorado)
- Television: Pluto TV, ELEVEN

2017–18 Big Sky women's basketball standings
	Conf.				Overall
Team	W		L	PCT	W		L	PCT
Northern Colorado †	15	–	3	.833	26	–	7	.788
Idaho	13	–	5	.722	19	–	14	.576
Eastern Washington	12	–	6	.667	17	–	14	.548
Weber State	12	–	6	.667	21	–	11	.656
Idaho State	11	–	7	.611	21	–	11	.656
Portland State	11	–	7	.611	19	–	13	.594
Montana	9	–	9	.500	14	–	17	.452
Montana State	9	–	9	.500	16	–	15	.516
North Dakota	5	–	13	.278	12	–	18	.400
Sacramento State	5	–	13	.278	7	–	23	.233
Northern Arizona	4	–	14	.222	7	–	23	.233
Southern Utah	2	–	16	.111	3	–	27	.100
† 2018 Big Sky tournament winner As of 19 March 2018; Rankings from AP poll

The 2018 Big Sky Conference women's basketball tournament was a tournament that held from March 5–10, 2018 at the Reno Events Center. Northern Colorado won their first Big Sky tournament for the first school history and earned an automatic trip to the 2018 NCAA tournament.

== Seeds ==
Big Sky Tiebreaker procedures are as follows:

1. Head-to-head
2. Performance against conference teams in descending order to finish
3. Higher RPI
4. Coin Flip

Seed	School	Conference	Overall*	Tiebreaker
1	Northern Colorado	15–3	23–6	
2	Idaho	13–5	17–12	
3	Eastern Washington	12–6	17–13	1–0 vs. WEB
4	Weber State	12–6	20–9	0–1 vs. EWU
5	Idaho State	11–7	19–10	2–0 vs. PSU
6	Portland State	11–7	17–12	0–2 vs. ISU
7	Montana State	9–9	15–14	1–1 vs. MONT, 1–0 vs. ISU
8	Montana	9–9	13–16	1–1 vs. MSU, 0–1 vs. ISU
9	Sacramento State	5–13	7–22	1–0 vs. UND
10	North Dakota	5–13	12–17	0–1 vs. SAC
11	Northern Arizona	4–14	7–22	
12	Southern Utah	2–16	3–26	

* Overall record at end of regular season.

== Schedule ==
Session	Game	Time*	Matchup^{#}	Television	Attendance
First Round – Monday, March 5
1	1	12:05 PM	#8 Sacramento State vs. #9 Montana	Pluto TV 231	512
1	2	2:35 PM	#5 Idaho State vs. #12 Southern Utah	Pluto TV 231	512
2	3	5:35 PM	#7 Montana State vs. #10 North Dakota	Pluto TV 231	
2	4	8:05 PM	#6 Portland State vs. #11 Northern Arizona	Pluto TV 231	
Quarterfinals – Wednesday, March 7
3	5	12:05 PM	#1 Northern Colorado vs. #9 Montana	Pluto TV 231	511
3	6	2:35 PM	#4 Weber State vs. #5 Idaho State	Pluto TV 231	511
4	7	5:35 PM	#2 Idaho vs. #7 Montana State	Pluto TV 231	989
4	8	8:05 PM	#3 Eastern Washington vs. #6 Portland State	Pluto TV 231	989
Semifinals – Friday, March 9
5	9	12:05 PM	#1 Northern Colorado vs. #5 Idaho State	ELEVEN	1,002
5	10	2:35 PM	#2 Idaho vs. #6 Portland State	ELEVEN	1,002
Championship Game – Saturday, March 10
6	11	12:05 PM	#1 Northern Colorado vs. #2 Idaho	ELEVEN	993
*Game Times in PT.

== Bracket ==
First round Monday, March 5 Pluto TV 231
8	Montana	87
9	Sacramento State	80
5	Idaho State	59
12	Southern Utah	49
7	Montana State	68
10	North Dakota	58
6	Portland State	77
11	Northern Arizona	61

Quarterfinals; Wednesday, March 7 Pluto TV 231
1	Northern Colorado	78
8	Montana	69
4	Weber State	109
5	Idaho State	113
2	Idaho	76
7	Montana State	74
3	Eastern Washington	73
6	Portland State	82

Semifinals; Friday, March 9 ELEVEN
1	Northern Colorado	73
5	Idaho State	66
2	Idaho	102
6	Portland State	99

Championship; Saturday, March 10; ELEVEN
1	Northern Colorado	91
2	Idaho	69

== See also ==
- 2018 Big Sky Conference men's basketball tournament
