= Kamie Ethridge =

American basketball player and coach

Washington State Cougars
- Title: Head coach
- League: Pac-12

Personal information
- Born: April 21, 1964 (age 62) Hereford, Texas, U.S.
- Listed height: 5 ft 5 in (1.65 m)
- Listed weight: 122 lb (55 kg)

Career information
- High school: Monterey (Lubbock, Texas)
- College: Texas (1982–1986)
- Playing career: 1988–1989
- Position: Point guard
- Coaching career: 1987–present

Career history

Playing
- 1988–1989: OECE

Coaching
- 1987–1988: Texas (GA)
- 1989–1990: Northern Illinois (GA)
- 1990–1991: Northern Illinois (assistant)
- 1991–1996: Vanderbilt (assistant)
- 1996–2014: Kansas State (assoc. HC)
- 2014–2018: Northern Colorado
- 2018–present: Washington State

Career highlights
- As player: NCAA champion (1986); Wade Trophy (1986); Honda Sports Award for basketball (1986); Frances Pomeroy Naismith Award (1986); Honda-Broderick Cup (1986); 2× Kodak All-American (1985, 1986); No. 33 retired by Texas Longhorns; As coach: Big Sky Coach of the Year (2018); Pac-12 Conference tournament (2023)
- Women's Basketball Hall of Fame
Medals
Representing the United States
Olympic Games
Gold medal – first place	1988 Seoul	Team competition
FIBA World Championship
Pan American Games
Gold medal – first place	1987 Indianapolis	Team competition
Gold medal – first place	1986 Moscow	Team competition
World University Games
Gold medal – first place	1985 Kobe	Team competition

Mary Camille "Kamie" Ethridge (born April 21, 1964) is an American former basketball player and current basketball coach. She was an All-American point guard at the University of Texas at Austin and won a gold medal at the 1988 Summer Olympics. She is considered one of the best women's basketball players in history and was inducted into the Women's Basketball Hall of Fame in 2002. Ethridge is currently the head coach at Washington State University.

== High school ==
Born in Hereford, Texas, Ethridge played guard for Monterey High School, in Lubbock, Texas. She led her team to a state championship (5A) in 1981.

== College ==
Ethridge attended the University of Texas, where she played for Hall of Fame coach Jody Conradt. The Longhorns were one of the more powerful teams in the country at the time Ethridge joined the team, and she would help strengthen that position. Ethridge arrived at Texas in 1982. In her first two years, the team earned a two seed at the 1983 and the 1984 NCAA basketball tournament. In 1984, the team was strong enough to earn the number one ranking in the regular season final AP poll. The team suffered knee injuries to five key players in 1984, including injuries to center Annette Smith so severe she was in rehabilitation for well over a year. In 1985, the team would also end the season ranked number one in the poll. That year, the team went 28–3 in the regular season, and looked forward to a Final Four held at their own arena, the Erwin Center. The Longhorns were stunned by a buzzer beating shot by Western Kentucky, and lost 92–90 in the Mideast Regional semifinals.

Despite earning lofty rankings, the team entered the 1985–86 season without having won a National Championship. Ethridge was one of six seniors, including Fran Harris, who were in their last year of college ball with one last chance for a championship. Ethridge was considered very competitive – she once competed in a triathlon, riding the 9-mile bicycle leg with a flat tire for the last three miles. The team was again ranked very high, prompting Sports Illustrated to refer to their arena as "the best little scorehouse in Texas".

the best little scorehouse in Texas

That year, the team entered the tournament undefeated, and won all their tournament games, finishing the season as the first undefeated NCAA Division I women's basketball team (34–0), and national champions. Ethridge was the 1986 winner of the Honda Sports Award for basketball and the overall Honda-Broderick Cup winner for all sports. She was also the winner of the Wade Trophy, reflecting leadership and character in addition to athletic ability. Etheridge was the 1986 recipient of the Frances Pomeroy Naismith award, which is presented by the WBCA annually to "the nation's most outstanding NCAA Division I female basketball player who stands 5'8" tall or under". That year she was also named the Southwest Conference's Female Athlete of they year. While at Texas, she had 776 assists, setting a school record.

On September 7, 2019, Ethridge's number 33 was officially retired at halftime of a Texas–LSU football game. She became the first female Longhorn athlete to receive this honor.

=== Texas statistics ===
Legend
GP	Games played	GS	Games started	MPG	Minutes per game
FG%	Field goal percentage	3P%	3-point field goal percentage	FT%	Free throw percentage
RPG	Rebounds per game	APG	Assists per game	SPG	Steals per game
BPG	Blocks per game	PPG	Points per game	**Bold**	Career high

Year	Team	GP	Points	FG%	FT%	RPG	APG	PPG
1982–83	Texas	**33**	127	43.1%	70.2%	2.2	NA	3.8
1983–84	Texas	35	**315**	48.1%	65.4%	**3.3**	NA	**9.0**
1984–85	Texas	31	211	47.4%	**72.1%**	2.9	**7.3**	6.8
1985–86	Texas	**33**	172	**50.4%**	65.7%	2.6	6.1	5.2
Career		132	825	47.5%	67.6%	2.7	3.2	6.3

== USA Basketball ==
Ethridge played for the USA World University Games team in Kobe, Japan in 1985. The team brought home a silver medal, after falling to the USSR. The team trailed by 18 points at one time, mounted a comeback attempt but fell short, losing 87–81. The following year, Ethridge played for the USA team at the World Championships, in Moscow. This time, the USA team would meet the USSR in the title game and emerge victorious, winning the gold medal with a score of 108–88.

Ethridge was a member of the gold medal-winning USA team competing in the Pan American games held in Indianapolis, Indiana during August 1987, although she saw limited action due to a knee injury sustained in the first game. Ethridge finished her USA basketball playing career with a gold medal win in the 1988 Olympics held in Seoul, Korea.

== Coaching ==
Ethridge was a graduate assistant at Texas in 1987–88 after completing her bachelor's degree, then played professionally in Italy for the team OECE in 1988–89. Ethridge became a graduate assistant at Northern Illinois in 1989 and was promoted to assistant coach in 1990. She then moved on to Vanderbilt and was part of the coaching staff under Jim Foster to help the team to a 1993 Final Four appearance. She then moved on to Kansas State, first as an assistant, then as associate head coach, where she helped the team become competitive.

Ethridge landed her first head coaching job in 2014 at Northern Colorado, and enjoyed immediate success, leading the Bears to a school-record 22 wins in her first season. She went on to lead the team to two additional 20-win seasons, capped off by a 2017–18 season that saw a school record of 26 wins, Big Sky Conference regular-season and tournament titles and the program's first-ever appearance in the NCAA tournament as a Division I member. At the end of the regular season, Ethridge was named the Big Sky coach of the year. After the tournament appearance, she was hired away by Washington State to replace the fired June Daugherty.

== Awards and honors ==
- 1986—Winner of the Honda Sports Award for basketball
- 1986—The Honda-Broderick Cup winner for all sports.
- 1986—The Wade Trophy
- 2000—University of Texas Women's Athletic Hall of Honor
- 2002—Women's Basketball Hall of Fame
- 2022—Pac-12 Coach of the Year
- 2023—National Coach of the Year by The Athletic

== Head coaching record ==
Record table
Season	Team	Overall	Conference	Standing	Postseason
Northern Colorado Bears (Big Sky Conference) (2014–2018)
2014–15	Northern Colorado	22–13	12–6	T–3rd	WNIT Third Round
2015–16	Northern Colorado	13–16	8–10	T–8th	
2016–17	Northern Colorado	22–8	14–4	3rd	
2017–18	Northern Colorado	26–7	15–3	1st	NCAA First Round
Northern Colorado:		83–44 (.654)	49–23 (.681)		
Washington State Cougars (Pac-12 Conference) (2018–2024)
2018–19	Washington State	9–21	4–14	10th	
2019–20	Washington State	11–20	4–14	11th	
2020–21	Washington State	12–12	9–10	7th	NCAA First Round
2021–22	Washington State	19–11	11–6	3rd	NCAA First Round
2022–23	Washington State	23–11	9–9	7th	NCAA First Round
2023–24	Washington State	21–15	7–11	T–8th	WBIT Semifinals
Washington State Cougars (West Coast Conference) (2024–2026)
2024–25	Washington State	21–14	14–6	3rd	WNIT Super 16
2024–25	Washington State	9–25	6–12	T–8th	
Washington State:		121–125 (.492)	62–78 (.443)		
Total:		204–169 (.547)			
