= Mabel Burnside Myers =

Navajo weaver

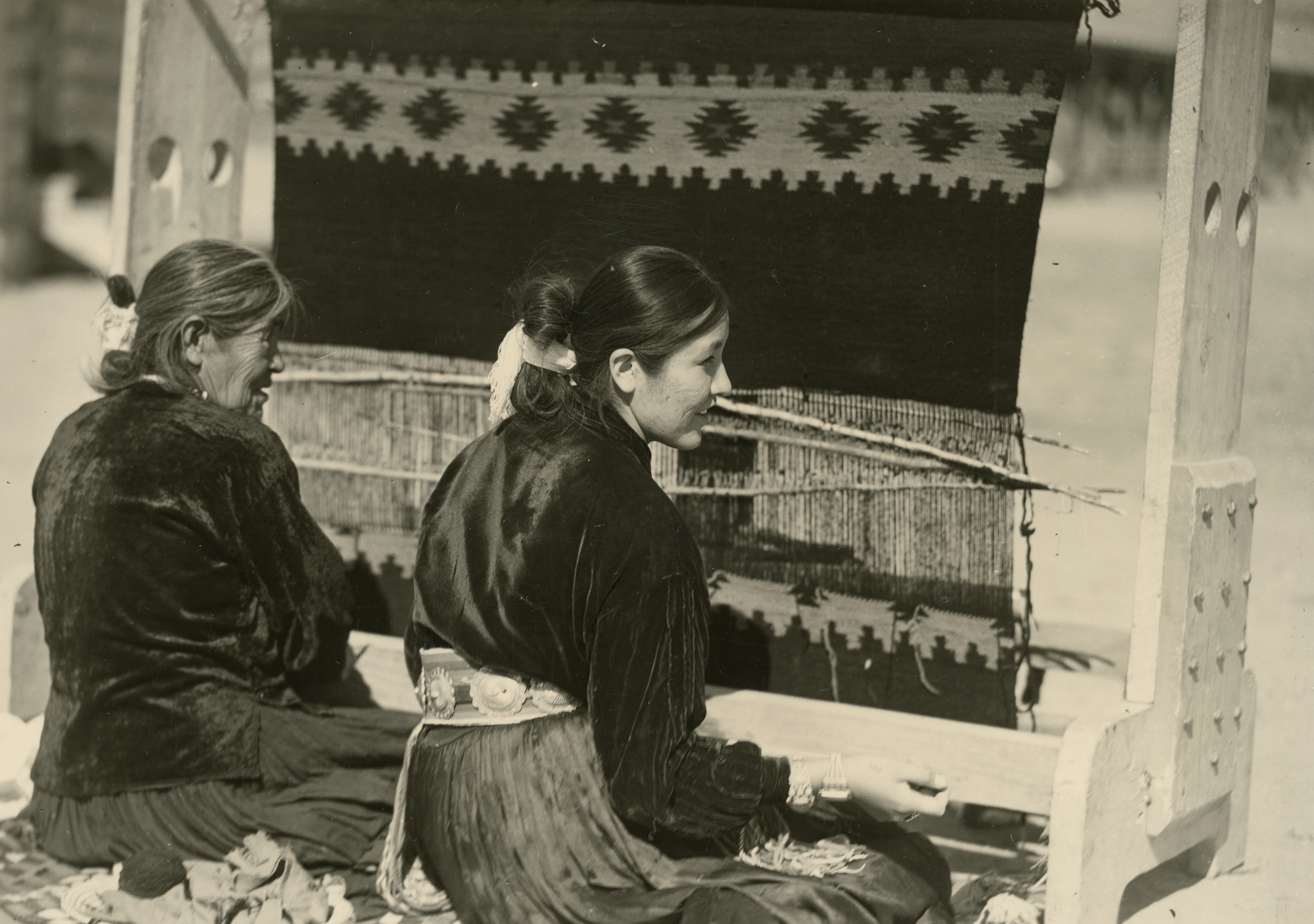
- Mabel Burnside, on right, at Navajo Fairgrounds, Window Rock, Arizona
- Born: 1922; Pine Springs, Arizona
- Died: 1987 (aged 64–65)
- Known for: weaving, vegetal dyes

Mabel Burnside Myers (1922–1987) was a Diné weaver, herbalist and sheepherder. She is known for being the first Indigenous weaver to create dye charts for teaching students.

== Life ==
Burnside Myers was born in 1922 in Pine Springs, Arizona into a family of weavers and silversmiths. She attended high school, graduating in 1938. At the Fort Wingate Vocational High School, she began to create a natural, plant-based dye book. She went on to become the head of the department of weaving at the Shiprock Vocational School, before reaching her 30th birthday.

Burnside Myers had five children; she taught all of them about identifying plants to make dyes. Her daughter, Isabel Deschinny, is a well-known textile artist.

== Work ==
Burnside Myers is known for creating complex work, such as two-faced blankets with a different design on each side. She would raise her own sheep, would forage for over 300 different plants to use for making dyes, card the wool and spin the yarn, dye the yarn, then set up the loom and weave.

Like other Navajo weavers, she kept the complex patterns for her weavings in her memory, rather than referring to a written or drawn pattern.

Her work has been exhibited nationally, and has been in exhibitions at the Museum of Northern Arizona in Flagstaff, and at the Arts & Crafts Guild, at Window Rock, Arizona.

Mabel Burnside Myers, Vegetal Dye Chart, c.1970

Burnside Myers used vegetable dye materials in her work, and is considered the first Indigenous weaver to invent dye charts from plant matter as guides to teach others about sources of dyes for use in weaving. Later, her dye charts were produced to sell on the tourist market. Each of her dye charts included a miniature woven textile on a miniature vertical frame loom, surrounded by pressed botanical specimens of plants, with each specimen identified with the name of the plant. Pieces of dyed yarn served as "pointers" to the various colors in the miniature weaving. The dye charts served as an "index of place...an atlas–a mental map–of Navajo weaving worlds" that provided a critical "material record of indigenous ways of knowing the landscape and its natural colorants." Burnside Myers would travel extensively to exhibit her work teach others about weaving with plant-based dyes.

Burnside Myers and her family were featured in the 1958 documentary film, The Navajo (Part 1):"The Search for America", directed by Dick Hatzel. In the film she presented an award-winning rug made with yarn dyed with 85 different plant-based colors. She has also been the subject of a film by Frank Cummings and Eileen Green. Burnside Myers and Green, an anthropologist, collaborated on a dye-recipe book.

=== Awards and honors ===
Burnside Myers won first place in the Navajo Tribal Fair in 1937. In 1939, she was invited to participate in the San Francisco Worlds Fair.
