= Seton Sobolewski =

American basketball coach

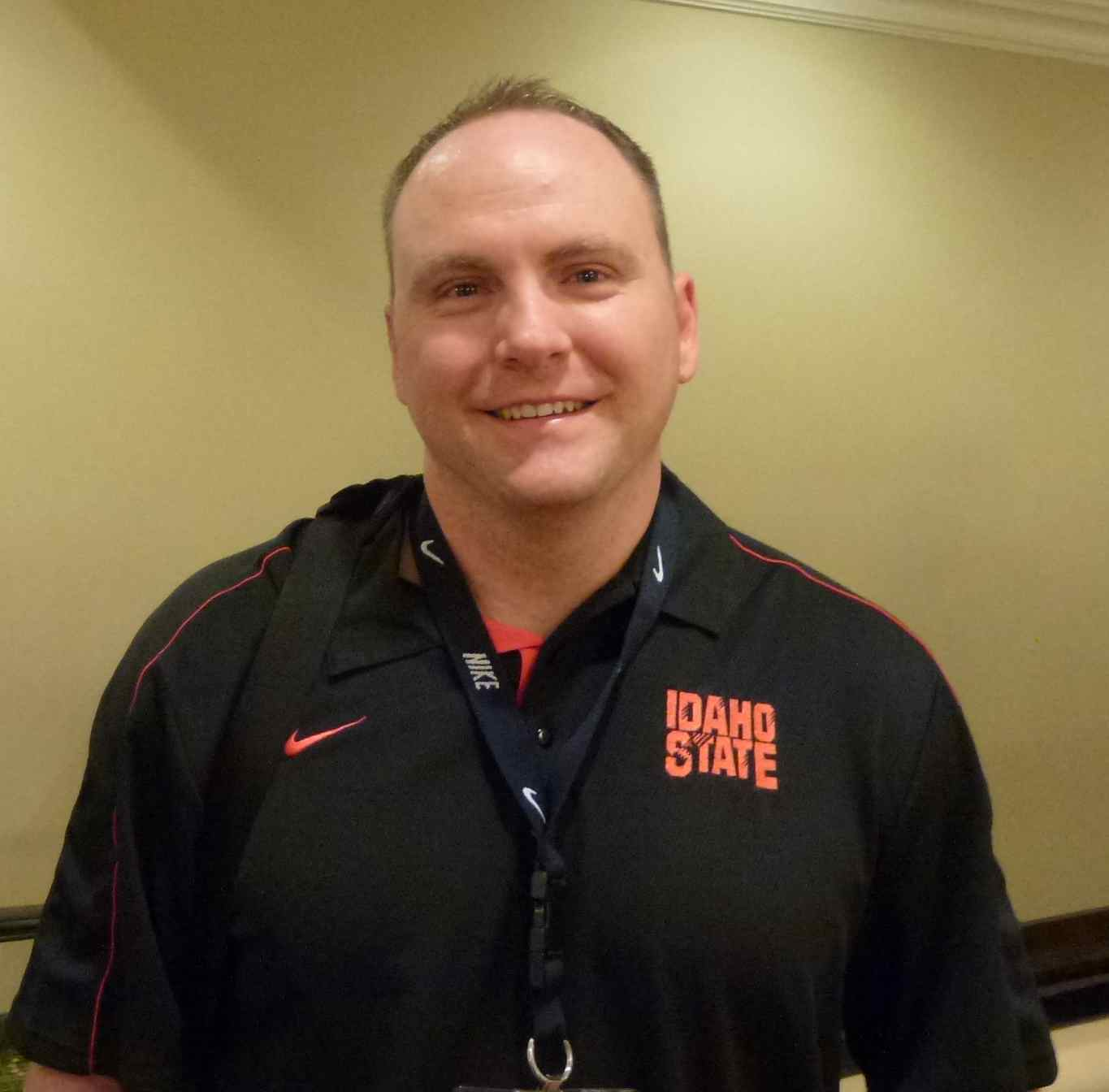
- Sobolewski in 2013

Current position
- Title: Head coach
- Team: Idaho State
- Conference: Big Sky
- Record: 305–248 (.552)

Biographical details
- Education: Northern Arizona University

Playing career
- 1995–1997: Eastern Arizona
- 1997–1999: Oklahoma Panhandle State

Coaching career (HC unless noted)
- 2001–2002: Yavapai (men's assistant)
- 2002–2008: UC Riverside (assistant)
- 2008–: Idaho State

Head coaching record
- Overall: 305–248 (.552)

Accomplishments and honors

Awards
- 3× Big Sky Coach of the Year

Seton Sobolewski is an American basketball coach who is the current head coach of the Idaho State Bengals women's basketball team.

== Career ==
On May 27, 2008, Sobolewski was hired as the twelfth women's basketball head coach at Idaho State.

On September 26, 2022, Sobolewski's contract was extended through the end of the 2026–27 season.

== Head coaching record ==
Record table
| Season | Team | Overall | Conference | Standing | Postseason |
|---|---|---|---|---|---|
Idaho State Bengals (Big Sky) (2008–present)
| 2008–09 | Idaho State | 11–20 | 7–9 | | |
| 2009–10 | Idaho State | 15–15 | 10–6 | | |
| 2010–11 | Idaho State | 18–12 | 9–7 | | |
| 2011–12 | Idaho State | 24–8 | 14–2 | 1st | NCAA First Round |
| 2012–13 | Idaho State | 18–13 | 13–7 | | WNIT First Round |
| 2013–14 | Idaho State | 14–17 | 11–9 | 5th | |
| 2014–15 | Idaho State | 13–17 | 8–10 | T-8th | |
| 2015–16 | Idaho State | 18–15 | 8–10 | T-8th | |
| 2016–17 | Idaho State | 19–14 | 10–8 | 6th | |
| 2017–18 | Idaho State | 21–11 | 11–7 | 5th | |
| 2018–19 | Idaho State | 20–11 | 15–5 | 3rd | WNIT First Round |
| 2019–20 | Idaho State | 18–13 | 13–7 | 3rd | |
| 2020–21 | Idaho State | 22–4 | 15–2 | 1st | NCAA First Round |
| 2021–22 | Idaho State | 19–12 | 15–5 | 1st | WNIT First Round |
| 2022–23 | Idaho State | 11–19 | 6–12 | 8th | |
| 2023–24 | Idaho State | 11–19 | 7–11 | 7th | |
| 2024–25 | Idaho State | 14–17 | 8–10 | T–5th | |
| 2025–26 | Idaho State | 19–11 | 12–6 | 4th | |
| 2026–27 | Idaho State | 0–0 | 0–0 | | |
| Idaho State: | | 305–248 (.552) | 201–133 (.602) | | |
| Total: | | 305–248 (.552) | | | |
National champion Postseason invitational champion Conference regular season champion Conference regular season and conference tournament champion Division regular season champion Division regular season and conference tournament champion Conference tournament champion
