= Idaho State Bengals women's basketball =

2026–27 Idaho State Bengals women's basketball team
- University: Idaho State University
- Head coach: Seton Sobolewski (19th season)
- Location: Pocatello, Idaho
- Arena: Reed Gym (capacity: 3,214)
- Conference: Big Sky
- Nickname: Bengals
- Colors: Orange and black

NCAA Division I tournament appearances
- 2001, 2007, 2012, 2021

Conference tournament champions
- 2001, 2007, 2012, 2021

Conference regular-season champions
- 2001, 2006, 2012, 2021, 2022

The Idaho State Bengals Women's Basketball is the team who represents Idaho State University located in Pocatello, Idaho, United States. The school's team currently competes in the Big Sky Conference, and play their home games at Reed Gym.

== History ==
Idaho State began play in 1974. They were members of the Intermountain from 1976 to 1978, the IMC in 1980 to 1982 before joining the Mountain West Athletic Conference (which merged with the Big Sky in 1988) in 1982. As of the end of the 2015–16 season, they have an all-time record of 534–614. They have made seven postseason appearances, four in the NCAA Tournament (2001, 2007, 2012) and four in the WNIT (2004, 2006, 2008, 2013), and they have lost in the First Round each time.

== NCAA tournament results ==
Year	Seed	Round	Opponent	Result
2001	#14	First Round	#3 Vanderbilt	L 83–57
2007	#15	First Round	#2 Stanford	L 96–58
2012	#14	First Round	#3 Miami (FL)	L 70–42
2021	#13	First Round	#4 Kentucky	L 71–63
