= Pine Springs, Arizona =

- Populated place
- Location within the state of Arizona Pine Springs (the United States)
- Coordinates: 35°24′19″N 109°16′48″W
- Country: United States
- State: Arizona
- County: Apache
- Elevation: 6,969 ft (2,124 m)
- Time zone: UTC-7 (Mountain (MST))
  - Summer (DST): UTC-7 (MST)
- Area code: 928
- FIPS code: 04-55850
- GNIS feature ID: 9479

Pine Springs (Navajo: Tʼiis Ííʼáhí) is a populated place situated in Apache County, Arizona, United States.

Pine Springs "sibling" town is Oak Springs. Pine Springs Road had been the main road to Window Rock before the interstate. It had a school, a trading post a log-constructed chapter house, and a Catholic mission. There is a copper deposit nearby that yields turquoise used by local silversmiths. In 2009, the main dirt road to Pine Springs was paved with asphalt, connecting it to Interstate 40.

== Notable people ==
- Mabel Burnside Myers, Navajo weaver
