= Pamplin Sports Center =

Sporting venue in Oregon

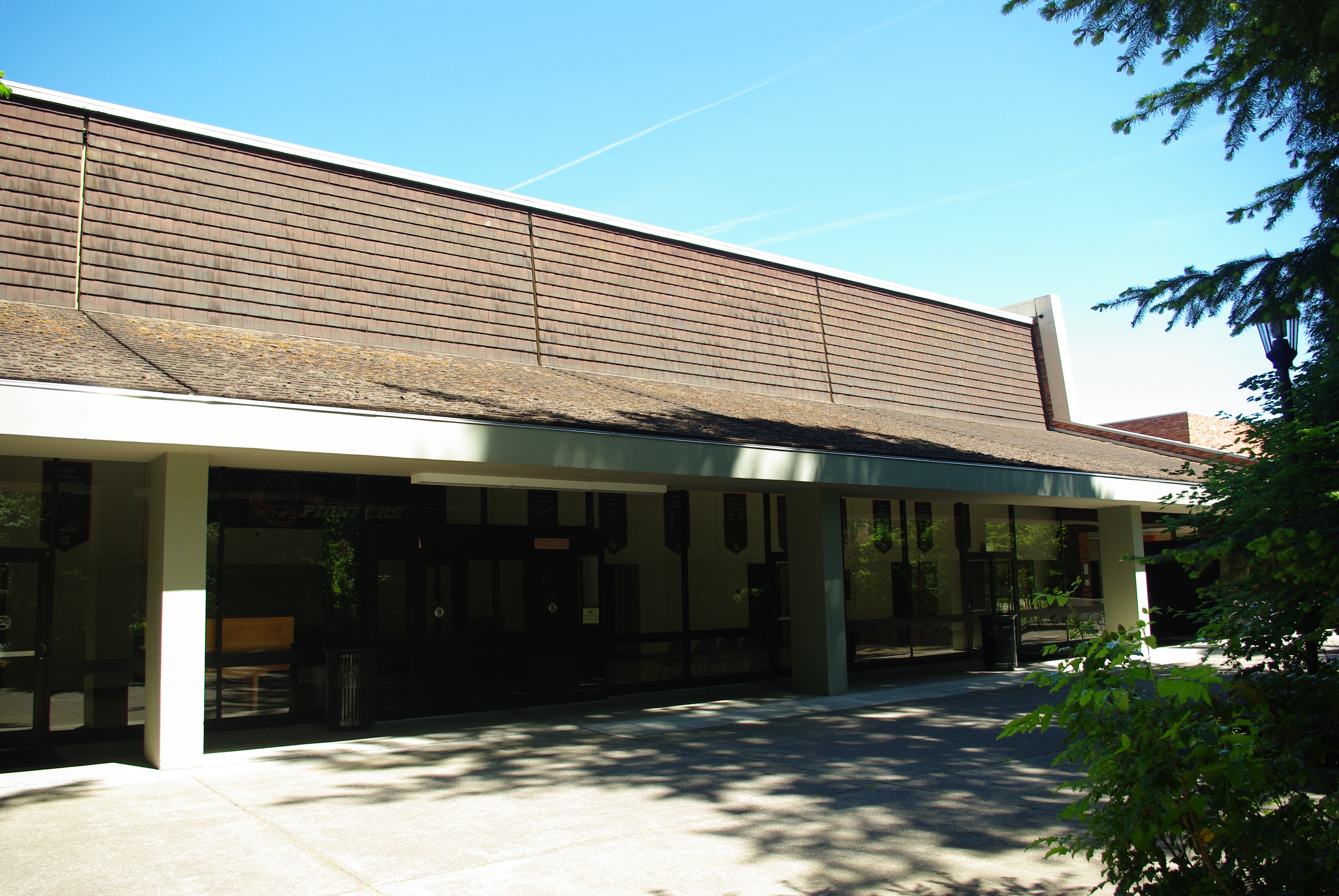
- Interactive map of Pamplin Sports Center
- Location: Portland, Oregon
- Coordinates: 45°27′06″N 122°40′14″W
- Owner: Lewis & Clark College
- Capacity: 2,300
- Scoreboard: Two Daktronics brand on each base line

Construction
- Built: 1968
- Opened: June 1968
- Renovated: 2007
- Cost: US$2.2 million
- Main contractors: Juhr and Sons

Tenants
- Lewis & Clark Pioneers men's basketball team (1968–present); Lewis & Clark Pioneers women's basketball team (1968–present); Lewis & Clark Pioneers volleyball team (1968–present); Portland State Vikings men's and women's basketball (2017–18)

The Pamplin Sports Center is a 2,300-seat basketball and volleyball arena in Portland, Oregon which serves as the home of the Lewis & Clark Pioneers. Before the Pamplin Sports Center, the college had a 1,600-seat arena that featured a plywood court, which was built in 1947 and burned down in 1966. For the next three seasons, the school's team had no home court and was forced to practice and play at several high school gymnasiums around the Portland metropolitan area. The Pamplin Sports Center was completed in 1969. In 2007, it was renovated and two practice courts were added that could be hidden under the bleachers during games. The stadium features two Daktronics-brand scoreboards on each base line. At the time of its construction, the Pamplin Sports Center cost US$2.2 million. It was constructed by Juhr and Sons from Portland. The arena was named after Robert B. Pamplin, whose son sat on the board of trustees for the college at the time.

== See also ==
- List of sports venues in Portland, Oregon
