= Reed Gym =

Indoor arena in Pocatello, Idaho

- Location in the United States Location in Idaho
- Address: 936 Martin Luther King Drive
- Location: Idaho State University; Pocatello, Idaho, U.S.
- Coordinates: 42.8645°N 112.429°W
- Elevation: 4,550 feet (1,390 m) AMSL
- Owner: Idaho State University
- Operator: Idaho State University
- Capacity: 3,214

Construction
- Built: 1951; 75 years ago
- Renovated: 2002, 2010

Tenants
- Idaho State Bengals (NCAA Division I) men's basketball (1951–1970, 2019–present) women's basketball, volleyball, men's & women's tennis

Reed Gym is a 3,214-seat multi-purpose arena in the western United States, on the campus of Idaho State University in Pocatello, Idaho. Opened 75 years ago in 1951, it is the home court of the ISU Bengals men's and women's basketball and volleyball teams of the Big Sky Conference. The home of the men's and women's tennis teams, Reed also serves as a student recreational center.

Prior to the opening of the ASISU Minidome (ICCU Dome) in 1970, the men's basketball team played at Reed Gym and enjoyed considerable success in the 1950s under head coaches Steve Belko and John Grayson. In 1957, the gym was the site of the play-in game for the West Regionals of the NCAA tournament; the Bengals defeated Hardin-Simmons of Texas by nine points and improved their record to 25–2. When Gus Johnson and the Idaho Vandals visited on a Friday night in 1963, a capacity crowd of 4,900 on February 15 saw the battle for the King Spud Trophy and unofficial state title, won by the visitors.

Men's basketball returned to Reed full-time for the 2019–20 season, citing the "positive difference" created by the intimate environment.

== See also ==
- List of NCAA Division I basketball arenas
