= List of Eastern Washington Eagles football seasons =

The following is a list of Eastern Washington Eagles football seasons.

== Seasons ==
Year	Coach	Overall	Conference	Standing	Bowl/playoffs	Coaches^{#}	AP^{°}
Independent (1901–1902)
1901	No coach	1–2					
1902	No coach	2–1–2					
Claude Arthur (Independent) (1903)
1903	Claude Arthur	3–2–2					
Henry E. Smith (Independent) (1904–1905)
1904	Henry E. Smith	1–6					
1905	Henry E. Smith	4–3					
Paul Lienau (Independent) (1906–1907)
1906	Paul Lienau	5–3					
1907	Paul Linenau	3–2					
Nick E. Hinch (Independent) (1908)
1908	Nick E. Hinch	2–3					
Harry Goldsworthy (Independent) (1909)
1909	Harry Goldsworthy	0–2					
Nick E. Hinch (Independent) (1912)
1912	Nick E. Hinch	0–1					
Albert Fertsch (Independent) (1913–1916)
1913	Albert Fertsch	1–5					
1914	Albert Fertsch	2–0					
1915	Albert Fertsch	1–1					
1916	Albert Fertsch	0–3					
1917	No team						
1918	No team						
1919	No team						
Vin Eustis (Tri-Normal League) (1920–1926)
1920	Vin Eustis	5–2	5–1				
1921	Vin Eustis	3–3	3–0	1st			
1922	Vin Eustis	1–5	1–2				
1923	Vin Eustis	5–2	4–1	T–1st			
1924	Vin Eustis	3–4–1	3–1–1				
1925	Vin Eustis	6–3	5–0	1st			
1926	Vin Eustis	1–6	0–2				
Arthur C. Woodward (Tri-Normal League) (1927–1928)
1927	Arthur C. Woodward	3–5	0–2				
1928	Arthur C. Woodward	4–3	1–1				
Brick Johnson (Tri-Normal League) (1929)
1929	Brick Johnson	4–4	1–1				
Red Reese (Tri-Normal League / Washington Intercollegiate Conference) (1930–1941)
1930	Red Reese	3–4	2–2				
1931	Red Reese	5–1–2	4–1–1				
1932	Red Reese	3–2–3	2–1–1				
1933	Red Reese	6–2	1–1				
1934	Red Reese	6–1	2–0	1st			
1935	Red Reese	4–2–1	1–0–1	1st			
1936	Red Reese	7–1	2–0	1st			
1937	Red Reese	6–1	2–0	1st			
1938	Red Reese	6–2–1	2–1				
1939	Red Reese	5–3	2–1	T–1st			
1940	Red Reese	6–2	3–1				
1941	Red Reese	5–2–1	2–1–1				
Ralph Peterson (Washington Intercollegiate Conference) (1942)
1942	Ralph Peterson	3–4	2–2				
1943	No team						
1944	No team						
1945	No team						
Red Reese (Washington Intercollegiate Conference) (1946)
1946	Red Reese	4–3–1	3–1–1				
Abe Poffenroth (Washington Intercollegiate Conference / Evergreen Conference) (1947–1952)
1947	Abe Poffenroth	6–1–1	4–0–1	T–1st			
1948	Abe Poffenroth	8–1	5–1	T–1st			
1949	Abe Poffenroth	7–2	5–1	T–1st			
1950	Abe Poffenroth	8–2	5–1	1st			
1951	Abe Poffenroth	2–6	1–4	T–4th			
1952	Abe Poffenroth	1–7	1–5	6th			
Ed Chissus (Evergreen Conference) (1953–1962)
1953	Ed Chissus	6–2	4–2	3rd			
1954	Ed Chissus	1–8	1–5	6th			
1955	Ed Chissus	4–4	3–3	4th			
1956	Ed Chissus	5–2–1	3–2–1	2nd			
1957	Ed Chissus	5–2–1	3–2–1	4th			
1958	Ed Chissus	4–4	2–3	4th			
1959	Ed Chissus	2–6–1	1–3–1	T–5th			
1960	Ed Chissus	2–7	1–5	6th			
1961	Ed Chissus	0–9	0–7	6th			
1962	Ed Chissus	0–8–1	0–6–1	6th			
Dave Holmes (Evergreen Conference) (1963–1967)
1963	Dave Holmes	3–6	2–5	T–4th			
1964	Dave Holmes	5–4	4–3	T–2nd			
1965	Dave Holmes	8–1	4–1	1st			
1966	Dave Holmes	7–1–1	4–1–1	1st			
1967	Dave Holmes	11–1–1	6–0	1st	L NAIA Championship		
Brent Wooten (Evergreen Conference) (1968–1970)
1968	Brent Wooten	3–7	3–3	2nd			
1969	Brent Wooten	4–5	4–2	T–1st			
1970	Brent Wooten	4–6	3–4	4th			
John Massengale (Evergreen Conference) (1971–1978)
1971	John Massengale	5–5	3–2	3rd			
1972	John Massengale	3–7	2–4	T–4th			
1973	John Massengale	5–4	2–4	5th			
1974	John Massengale	4–5	4–2	2nd			
1975	John Massengale	3–6	2–3	6th			
1976	John Massengale	4–4–1	3–2–1	3rd			
1977	John Massengale	5–4	3–3	T–3rd			
1978	John Massengale	6–4	4–2	2nd			
Dick Zornes (NCAA Division II Independent) (1979–1983)
1979	Dick Zornes	7–2					
1980	Dick Zornes	6–4					
1981	Dick Zornes	7–3					
1982	Dick Zornes	8–2					
1983	Dick Zornes	5–5					
Dick Zornes (NCAA Division I-AA Independent) (1984–1986)
1984	Dick Zornes	7–2–1					
1985	Dick Zornes	9–3			L NCAA Division I-AA Quarterfinal		11
1986	Dick Zornes	6–5					
Dick Zornes (Big Sky Conference) (1987–1993)
1987	Dick Zornes	4–7	2–6	8th			
1988	Dick Zornes	2–8–1	2–6	8th			
1989	Dick Zornes	4–6	4–4	5th			
1990	Dick Zornes	5–6	3–5	T–5th			
1991	Dick Zornes	5–6	4–4	T–4th			
1992	Dick Zornes	7–4	6–1	T–1st	L NCAA Division I-AA First Round		14
1993	Dick Zornes	7–3	5–2	T–2nd			20
Mike Kramer (Big Sky Conference) (1994–1999)
1994	Mike Kramer	4–7	2–5	T–6th			
1995	Mike Kramer	3–8	1–6	8th			
1996	Mike Kramer	6–5	4–4	T–5th			
1997	Mike Kramer	12–2	7–1	1st	L NCAA Division I-AA Semifinal		6
1998	Mike Kramer	5–6	4–4	T–4th			
1999	Mike Kramer	7–4	6–2	T–2nd			
Paul Wulff (Big Sky Conference) (2000–2007)
2000	Paul Wulff	6–5	5–2	5th			
2001	Paul Wulff	7–4	3–4	5th			
2002	Paul Wulff	6–5	3–4	4th			
2003	Paul Wulff	6–5	3–4	6th			
2004	Paul Wulff	9–4	6–1	T–1st	L NCAA Division I-AA Quarterfinal		8
2005	Paul Wulff	7–5	5–2	T–1st	L NCAA Division I-AA First Round		13
2006	Paul Wulff	3–8	2–5	T–6th			
2007	Paul Wulff	9–4	5–2	2nd	L NCAA Division I-AA Quarterfinal	8	8
Beau Baldwin (Big Sky Conference) (2008–2016)
2008	Beau Baldwin	6–5	5–3	T–3rd			
2009	Beau Baldwin	8–4	6–2	T–2nd	L NCAA Division I First Round	13	13
2010	Beau Baldwin	13–2	7–1	T–1st	W NCAA Division I Championship	1	1
2011	Beau Baldwin	6–5	5–3	T–3rd			
2012	Beau Baldwin	11–3	7–1	T–1st	L NCAA Division I Semifinal	4	4
2013	Beau Baldwin	12–3	8–0	1st	L NCAA Division I Semifinal	3	3
2014	Beau Baldwin	11–3	7–1	1st	L NCAA Division I Quarterfinal	4	4
2015	Beau Baldwin	6–5	5–3	T–4th			
2016	Beau Baldwin	12–2	8–0	T–1st	L NCAA Division I Semifinal	4	4
Aaron Best (Big Sky Conference) (2017–present)
2017	Aaron Best	7–4	6–2	T–3rd		21	22
2018	Aaron Best	12–3	7–1	T–1st	L NCAA Division I Championship	2	2
2019	Aaron Best	7–5	6–2	5th			
2020	Aaron Best	5–2	5–1	2nd	L NCAA Division I First Round	11	10
2021	Aaron Best	10–3	6–2	T–3rd	L NCAA Division I Second Round	9	7
2022	Aaron Best	3–8	2–6	T–8th			
2023	Aaron Best	4–7	3–5	T–9th			
2024	Aaron Best	4–8	3–5	T–6th			
2025	Aaron Best	5–7	4–4	T–6th			
Total:		588–451–22					
National championship Conference title Conference division title or championship game berth
^{†}Indicates Bowl Coalition, Bowl Alliance, BCS, or CFP / New Years' Six bowl.; ^{#}Rankings from final Coaches Poll.
