= 1922 Cheney Normal football team =

American college football season

1922 Cheney Normal football
- Conference: Spokane Intercollegiate Conference, Tri-Normal Conference
- Record: 1–5 (1–2 Spokane, 0–2 Tri-Normal)
- Head coach: Vin Eustis (3rd season)

1922 Spokane Intercollegiate Conference football standings
	Conf.					Overall
Team	W		L		T	W		L		T
Whitworth $	5	–	0	–	0	?	–	?	–	?
Spokane College	3	–	2	–	0	?	–	?	–	?
Cheney Normal	1	–	2	–	0	1	–	5	–	0
Spokane University	0	–	5	–	0	?	–	?	–	?
$ – Conference champion

The 1922 Cheney Normal football team represented the State Normal School at Cheney—now known as Eastern Washington University—as member of the Spokane Intercollegiate Conference and the Tri-Normal Conference during the 1922 college football season. Led by third-year head coach Vin Eustis, Cheney Normal compiled an overall record of 1–5 with a record of 1–2 in Spokane play and 0–2 against Tri-Normal opponents.

== Schedule ==
Date	Time	Opponent	Site	Result	Source
October 14		Idaho freshman*	Cheney, WA	L 0–44	
October 21		at Washington State freshman*	Rogers Field; Pullman, WA	L 0–81	
October 27	3:15 p.m.	Spokane College	Cheney, WA	L 6–7	
November 3	2:30 p.m.	at Spokane University	Spokane, WA	W 26–0	
November 10	2:30 p.m.	at Whitworth	Spokane, WA	L 6–14	
November 17	2:00 p.m.	Ellensburg Normal*	Cheney, WA	L 10–13	
*Non-conference game; All times are in Pacific time; Source:
