= List of Eastern Washington Eagles men's basketball head coaches =

The following is a list of Eastern Washington Eagles men's basketball head coaches. There have been 19 head coaches of the Eagles in their 115-season history.

Eastern Washington's current head coach is David Riley. He was hired as the Eagles' head coach in March 2021, replacing Shantay Legans, who left to become the head coach at Portland.

No.	Tenure	Coach	Years	Record	Pct.
–	1903–1905; 1911–1912	Unknown	3	1–4	.200
1	1905–1906	Nick E. Hinch	1	3–6	.333
2	1906–1909	Paul Lienau	3	16–10	.615
3	1912–1916	Albert Fertsch	4	11–2	.846
4	1919–1927	Vin Eustis	8	108–43	.715
5	1927–1930	Arthur C. Woodward	3	26–29	.473
6	1930–1942; 1945–1964	Red Reese	31	470–301	.610
7	1942–1945	Bob Brumlay	3	75–17	.815
8	1964–1967	Ernie McKie	3	23–52	.307
9	1967–1982; 1983–1985	Jerry Krause	17	261–197	.570
10	1982–1983; 1985–1987	Joe Folda	3	42–42	.500
11	1987–1990	Bob Hofman	3	32–54	.372
12	1990–1995	John Wade	5	34–98	.258
13	1995–2000	Steve Aggers	5	51–82	.383
14	2000–2004	Ray Giacoletti	4	69–50	.580
15	2004–2007	Mike Burns	3	38–49	.437
16	2007–2011	Kirk Earlywine	4	42–78	.350
17	2011–2017	Jim Hayford	6	106–91	.538
18	2017–2021	Shantay Legans	4	75–49	.605
19	2021–present	David Riley	2	41–27	.603
Totals		19 coaches	115 seasons	1,524–1,281	.543
Records updated through end of 2022–23 season Source
