= 1923 Cheney Normal Savages football team =

American college football season

1923 Cheney Normal Savages football

Spokane Intercollegiate Conference champion
- Conference: Spokane Intercollegiate Conference, Tri-Normal Conference
- Record: 5–2 (3–0 Spokane, 1–1 Tri-Normal)
- Head coach: Vin Eustis (4th season)

1923 Spokane Intercollegiate Conference football standings
	Conf.					Overall
Team	W		L		T	W		L		T
Cheney Normal $	3	–	0	–	0	5	–	2	–	0
Spokane College	2	–	1	–	0	?	–	?	–	?
Whitworth	1	–	2	–	0	?	–	?	–	?
Spokane University	0	–	3	–	0	?	–	?	–	?
$ – Conference champion

1923 Tri-Normal Conference football standings
	Conf.					Overall
Team	W		L		T	W		L		T
Bellingham Normal $	2	–	0	–	0	3	–	0	–	2
Cheney Normal	1	–	1	–	0	5	–	2	–	0
Ellensburg Normal	0	–	2	–	0	0	–	3	–	0
$ – Conference champion

The 1923 Cheney Normal Savages football team represented the State Normal School at Cheney—now known as Eastern Washington University—as member of the Spokane Intercollegiate Conference and the Tri-Normal Conference during the 1923 college football season. Led by fourth-year head coach Vin Eustis, The Savages compiled an overall record of 5–2. They were 3–0 in Spokane play and 1–1 against Tri-Normal opponents, winning the Spokane Intercollegiate Conference title.

== Schedule ==
Date	Time	Opponent	Site	Result	Attendance	Source
October 12		Spokane University	Cheney, WA	W 30–0		
October 26		at Ellensburg Normal	Ellensburg, WA	W 20–2		
October 30		Spokane University	Cheney, WA	W 35–6		
November 2		Whitworth	Cheney, WA	W 54–0		
November 10		at Idaho freshman*	MacLean Field; Moscow, ID	L 6–25		
November 17		Washington State freshman*	Cheney, WA	W 18–6		
November 29	11:00 a.m.	at Bellingham Normal	Waldo Field; Bellingham, WA	L 13–27	2,000	
*Non-conference game; All times are in Pacific time; Source:
