= 1920 Cheney Normal football team =

American college football season

1920 Cheney Normal football
- Conference: Spokane Intercollegiate Conference
- Record: 5–2 (5–2 Spokane)
- Head coach: Vin Eustis (1st season)

1920 Spokane Intercollegiate Conference football standings
	Conf.					Overall
Team	W		L		T	W		L		T
Spokane University $	6	–	1	–	0	?	–	?	–	?
Cheney Normal	5	–	2	–	0	5	–	2	–	0
Spokane College	2	–	4	–	0	?	–	?	–	?
Whitworth	0	–	6	–	0	?	–	?	–	?
$ – Conference champion

The 1920 Cheney Normal football team represented the State Normal School at Cheney—now known as Eastern Washington University—as member of the Spokane Intercollegiate Conference during the 1920 college football season. Led by first-year head coach Vin Eustis, Cheney Normal compiled an overall and conference record of 5–2.

== Schedule ==
Date	Opponent	Site	Result	Source
October 15	Spokane University	Cheney, WA	W 21–0	
October 22	at Whitworth	Spokane, WA	W 48–0	
October 29	at Spokane College	Gonzaga Stadium; Spokane, WA	W 21–8	
November 5	at Spokane University	Spokane University field; Spokane, WA	L 0–13	
November 12	Whitworth	Cheney, WA	W 33–7	
November 19	Spokane College	Cheney, WA	W 23–0	
November 25	vs. Spokane University	Interstate Fairgrounds; Spokane Valley, WA	L 0–33	
