= 1924 Cheney Normal Savages football team =

American college football season

1924 Cheney Normal Savages football

Columbia Valley Conference co-champion
- Conference: Columbia Valley Conference, Tri-Normal Conference
- Record: 3–4–1 (2–0–1 Columbia Valley, 1–1 Tri-Normal)
- Head coach: Vin Eustis (5th season)

1924 Columbia Valley Conference football standings
	Conf.					Overall
Team	W		L		T	W		L		T
Cheney Normal +	2	–	0	–	1	3	–	4	–	1
Spokane College +	2	–	0	–	1	?	–	?	–	?
Whitworth	1	–	2	–	0	?	–	?	–	?
Lewiston Normal	0	–	3	–	0	?	–	?	–	?
+ – Conference co-champions

1924 Tri-Normal Conference football standings
	Conf.					Overall
Team	W		L		T	W		L		T
Bellingham Normal $	2	–	0	–	0	4	–	2	–	0
Cheney Normal	1	–	1	–	0	3	–	4	–	1
Ellensburg Normal	0	–	2	–	0	1	–	4	–	0
$ – Conference champion

The 1924 Cheney Normal Savages football team represented the State Normal School at Cheney—now known as Eastern Washington University—as member of the Columbia Valley Conference and the Tri-Normal Conference during the 1924 college football season. Led by fifth-year head coach Vin Eustis, The Savages compiled an overall record of 3–4–1. They were 2–0–1 in Spokane play and 1–1 against Tri-Normal opponents, sharing the Columbia Valley Conference title with Spokane.

== Schedule ==
Date	Time	Opponent	Site	Result	Attendance	Source
September 27		at Gonzaga*	Gonzaga Stadium; Spokane, WA	L 0–27	2,700	
October 10		at College of Idaho*	Caldwell, ID	L 6–17	700	
October 18		Idaho freshman*	Cheney, WA	L 7–13		
October 25		Ellensburg Normal^{†}	Cheney, WA	W 33–0	2,500	
November 1		at Whitworth	Spokane, WA	W 12–0		
November 6		Spokane College	Cheney, WA	T 0–0		
November 15		Lewiston State Normal	Cheney, WA	W 1–0 (Lewiston State forfeit)		
November 22	2:00 p.m.	at Bellingham Normal	Waldo Field; Bellingham, WA	L 0–13	1,400	
*Non-conference game; ^{†}Homecoming; All times are in Pacific time; Source:
