= Ford L. Bailor =

American college sports coach, educator (1898–1960

Biographical details
- Born: October 16, 1898; Oakesdale, Washington, U.S.
- Died: December 27, 1960 (aged 62); New York, New York, U.S.

Playing career

Football
- 1918–1919: Montana Wesleyan
- Position: Fullback

Coaching career (HC unless noted)

Football
- 1923–1924: Intermountain Union
- 1925–1928: Spokane University
- 1929–1931: Whitworth

Basketball
- 1925–1929: Spokane University
- 1929–1932: Whitworth

Administrative career (AD unless noted)
- 1923–1925: Intermountain Union
- 1927–1929: Spokane University

Accomplishments and honors

Championships
- Football; 2 Columbia Valley Conference (1926–1927)

Ford Laroy Bailor (October 16, 1898 – December 27, 1960) was an American college football coach, athletic administrator, and educator.

Bailor was born in Oakesdale, Washington. He attended Great Falls High School in Great Falls, Montana, where he starred in football for four years. He then played football at Montana Wesleyan College as a fullback in 1918 and was elected team captain for 1919.

In 1921, Bailor was the director of boys' work at the YMCA in Great Falls. In 1923, he was the football coach at Intermountain Union College in Helena, Montana.

In 1925, Bailor was appointed athletic coach at Spokane University in Spokane, Washington, where he earned a Bachelor of Arts degree. In 1929, Bailor was hired as athletic coach and director of physical education at Whitworth College.

Bailor was later vice president of the National Conference of Christians and Jews—now known as the National Conference for Community and Justice. He died of a heart attack, on December 27, 1960, in Manhattan. He had resided in Great Neck, New York.
