= Abe Cohn =

Cliff Olson
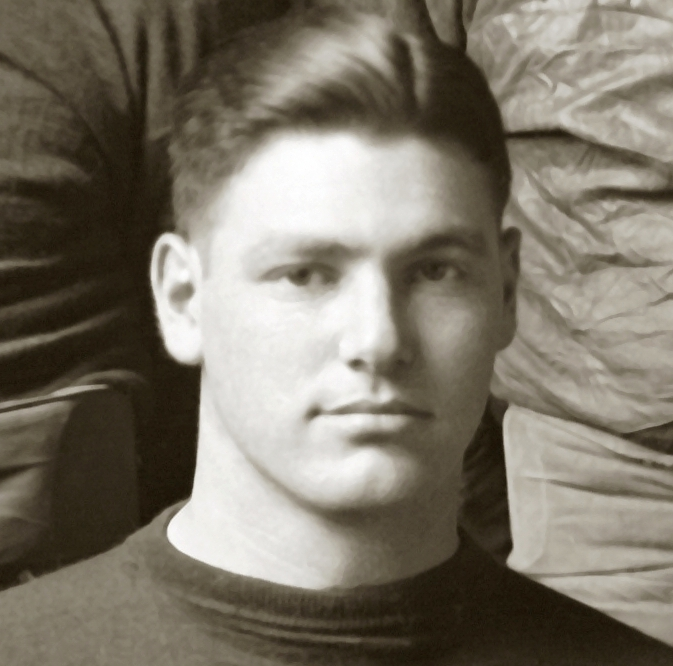
- Cohn cropped from 1918 Michigan team portrait

Biographical details
- Born: June 27, 1897; Portland, Oregon, U.S.
- Died: October 23, 1970 (aged 73); Seattle, Washington, U.S.

Playing career

Football
- 1917–1918: Michigan
- 1920: Michigan

Basketball
- 1917–1919: Michigan
- Positions: Halfback, end (football); Forward (basketball)

Coaching career (HC unless noted)

Football
- 1921–1922: Whitworth
- 1923–1924: Spokane College

Basketball
- 1921–1923: Whitworth
- 1923–1925: Spokane College

Accomplishments and honors

Championships
- Football; 2 Spokane / Columbia Valley (1922, 1924)

Abraham Jerome Cohn (June 27, 1897 – October 23, 1970) was an American football and basketball player, coach and official. He played football and basketball at the University of Michigan from 1917 to 1920. He coached football and basketball at Whitworth College from 1921 to 1923 and at Spokane College from 1923 to 1925. He was also an official for the Pacific Coast Conference and the supervisor of the Washington State Liquor Board's licensing bureau from 1934 to 1968.

== Early years ==
Cohn was born in Portland, Oregon in 1897. His parents, Hyman (sometimes listed as Herman) and Eva Cohn, emigrated from Russia to the United States in 1884 or 1885, and were identified in U.S. Census records as "Russian Yiddish." At the time of the 1900 Census, Cohn was living with his parents and four older siblings in Spokane, Washington. Cohn's father and two uncles founded the Cohn Brothers furniture store in Spokane in the 1890s. Over the next 40 years, the family continued to operate the store at the same location. Cohn attended Spokane's Lewis and Clark High School where he was a star football and basketball player. He was "remembered by Spokane football enthusiasts as the plunging back of the 1915 Lewis and Clark high school football team."

== University of Michigan ==
Cohn enrolled at the University of Michigan in 1916. He was a member of the law school class of 1921. While at Michigan, he played halfback for the Michigan Wolverines football teams of 1917, 1918 and 1920. The 1918 team completed the season undefeated and has been rated by some as the national championship team of 1918. After Michigan's victory over Case to open the 1918 season, the Detroit Free Press called Abe Cohn "an eye opener" as a ground gainer and noted: "He made a gain practically every time he was given the ball and, when he was stopped, it always took two or three men to turn the trick." Cohn did not try out for the football team in 1919. Having only one year of varsity eligibility remaining, and with many players returning to college following service in World War I, Coach Yost recommended that Cohn save his final year for the 1920 season. He returned to the Wolverines football team in 1920. The 1921 Michiganensian (University of Michigan yearbook) noted, "Cohn was especially valuable, filling in at end when the occasion demanded." The authors added, "A heavy, fast player, who was a regular halfback, but could take his place at end or fullback if occasion demanded. He is one of the stars lost by graduation."

Cohn also played for the Michigan Wolverines men's basketball team. He was a starting forward in 1918.

== Later years ==
After graduating from Michigan, Cohn returned to Spokane. In September 1921, he was appointed as the football and basketball coach at Whitworth College. He coached at Whitworth for two years and also coached at Mead High School in the mornings.

Cohn was the head football coach at Spokane College in 1923 and 1924.

In 1924, The Michigan Alumnus reported that Cohn was affiliated with Cohn Brothers Furniture, the furniture business begun by his father. Cohn remained a partner in the furniture business until the store's closure in 1960.

In 1932, Cohn was living in Seattle, Washington. He served as a football and basketball official for 30 years, including approximately eight years as a football official for the Pacific Coast Conference from 1930 to 1937.

Cohn also worked for many years for the Washington State Liquor Control Board. He began with a position as the assistant manager of Liquor Store No. 2 in Seattle. He was the supervisor of the Liquor Board's licensing bureau from 1934 until his retirement in 1968.

Cohn was married to Alta Clark. In October 1970, Cohn died of a heart attack in Seattle. He was age 73 at the time of his death.

== Head coaching record ==
=== Football ===
Year	Team	Overall	Conference	Standing	Bowl/playoffs
Whitworth (Spokane Intercollegiate Conference) (1921–1922)
1921	Whitworth	5–1	4–1	2nd	
1922	Whitworth		5–0	1st	
Whitworth:			9–1		
Spokane College Chieftains (Spokane Intercollegiate Conference / Columbia Valley Conference) (1923–1924)
1923	Spokane College		2–1	2nd	
1924	Spokane College		2–0–1	T–1st	
Spokane College:			4–1–1		
Total:					
National championship Conference title Conference division title or championship game berth

== See also ==
- List of Jews in sports (non-players)
