= 1925 Cheney Normal Savages football team =

American college football season

1925 Cheney Normal Savages football

Columbia Valley champion Tri-Normal champion
- Conference: Columbia Valley Conference, Tri-Normal Conference
- Record: 6–3 (3–0 Columbia Valley, 2–0 Tri-Normal)
- Head coach: Vin Eustis (6th season)

1925 Columbia Valley Conference football standings
	Conf.					Overall
Team	W		L		T	W		L		T
Cheney Normal $	3	–	0	–	0	6	–	3	–	0
Spokane College	2	–	1	–	0	?	–	?	–	?
Whitworth	1	–	2	–	0	?	–	?	–	?
Spokane University	0	–	3	–	0	?	–	?	–	?
$ – Conference champion

1925 Tri-Normal Conference football standings
	Conf.					Overall
Team	W		L		T	W		L		T
Cheney Normal $	2	–	0	–	0	6	–	3	–	0
Bellingham Normal	1	–	1	–	0	5	–	2	–	0
Ellensburg Normal	0	–	2	–	0	2	–	4	–	0
$ – Conference champion

The 1925 Cheney Normal Savages football team represented the State Normal School at Cheney—now known as Eastern Washington University—as member of the Columbia Valley Conference and the Tri-Normal Conference during the 1925 college football season. Led by sixth-year head coach Vin Eustis, the Savages compiled an overall record of 6–3. They were 3–0 in Columbia Valley play and 2–0 against Tri-Normal opponents, winning both conference titles.

== Schedule ==
Date	Time	Opponent	Site	Result	Attendance	Source
September 26	2:30 p.m.	at Gonzaga*	Gonzaga Stadium; Spokane, WA	L 0–37	1,500	
October 2		at Whitman*	Walla Walla, WA	L 0–25		
October 10		at Idaho freshmen*	Cheney, WA	W 9–6		
October 17		at College of Idaho*	Caldwell, ID	L 13–21		
October 24		Bellingham Normal^{†}	Cheney, WA	W 47–3	3,000	
October 31		at Ellensburg Normal	Ellensburg, WA	W 6–0		
November 7		Whitworth	Cheney, WA	W 15–0		
November 13	2:30 p.m.	at Spokane University	Spokane University field; Spokane, WA	W 13–0	300	
November 14	2:00 p.m.	at Spokane College	Gonzaga Stadium; Spokane, WA	W 41–0	500	
*Non-conference game; ^{†}Homecoming; All times are in Pacific time
