= 1921 Cheney Normal football team =

American college football season

1921 Cheney Normal football

Spokane Intercollegiate Conference champion
- Conference: Spokane Intercollegiate Conference
- Record: 3–3 (3–0 Spokane)
- Head coach: Vin Eustis (2nd season)

1921 Spokane Intercollegiate Conference football standings
	Conf.					Overall
Team	W		L		T	W		L		T
Cheney Normal $	3	–	0	–	0	3	–	3	–	0
Whitworth	4	–	1	–	0	5	–	1	–	0
Spokane College	1	–	3	–	1	?	–	?	–	?
Spokane University	0	–	4	–	1	?	–	?	–	?
$ – Conference champion

The 1921 Cheney Normal football team represented the State Normal School at Cheney—now known as Eastern Washington University—as member of the Spokane Intercollegiate Conference during the 1921 college football season. Led by second-year head coach Vin Eustis, Cheney Normal compiled an overall record of 3–3 with a record of 3–0 in conference play, winning the Spokane Intercollegiate Conference title.

== Schedule ==
Date	Opponent	Site	Result	Source
October 7	Washington State freshman*	Cheney, WA	L 0–28	
October 22	at Spokane College	Gonzaga Stadium; Spokane, WA	W 52–0	
October 28	Spokane University	Cheney, WA	W 48–0	
November 5	at Idaho freshman*	MacLean Field; Moscow, ID	L 0–34	
November 11	Whitworth	Cheney, WA	W 21–2	
November 18	at Ellensburg Normal*	Ellensburg, WA	L 0–6	
*Non-conference game; Source:
