= Reese Court =

Multi-purpose arena in Cheney, Washington

Special Events Pavilion
- "Reese Court" and "The Phase"
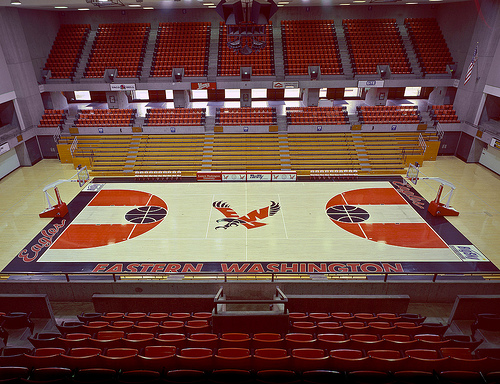
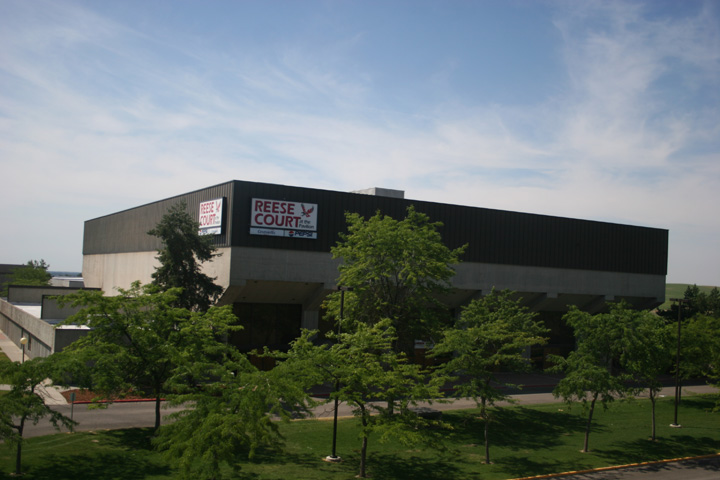
- Interactive map of Special Events Pavilion
- Location: Washington Street; Cheney, Washington
- Coordinates: 47.4914°N 117.5892°W
- Owner: Eastern Washington University
- Operator: Eastern Washington University
- Capacity: 6,000
- Surface: Hardwood

Construction
- Opened: June 6, 1975; 51 years ago
- Cost: $4.5 million ($26.9 million in 2025 dollars)

Tenants
- Eastern Washington Eagles; NAIA (1975–1983); NCAA (1983–present)

Reese Court is a 6,000-seat multi-purpose arena in Cheney, Washington, on the campus of Eastern Washington University. It is home to the EWU Eagles basketball team and replaced Eastern Washington Fieldhouse in 1975. It was the host venue of the 2004 Big Sky Conference men's basketball tournament, and is located southwest of the football stadium, Roos Field.

== Naming ==
The gem of the Sports and Recreation Center, the Special Events Pavilion opened in 1975 for spring quarter commencement on June 6.

The basketball court was named in September 1980 for legendary coach William B. "Red" Reese (1899–1974) and is now referred to as Reese Court. Coach Reese amassed an impressive 473 victories against 298 defeats during his 31 years as head coach of three sports: football, basketball, and track.

=== William Reese ===
Known for his fierce competitiveness, Reese led the Savages from 1930 to 1964. During World War II, he served as physical fitness officer and football coach for the Second Air Force. Located just off the main court is a conference room named in Reese's honor that has many interesting mementos of his era as head coach. Reese was a 1920 graduate of Pullman High School and played basketball for the Cougars at Washington State College (now WSU), and graduated in 1925.

== Uses ==
Reese Court has been home to the Eagle basketball and volleyball teams since the 1975–76 season. Other regularly scheduled events in the facility include:

- Graduation Ceremonies
- Concerts
- High school regional basketball playoffs
- Science Olympiad competition
- Killin fundraising dinner (conclusion of spring football practice)
- Gymnastics and basketball classes
- Summer basketball camps

== Graduation ==
Graduation ceremonies for graduate students are held at Reese Court annually. Before 2004, the non-undergraduate graduation ceremony for EWU was held at the Spokane Arena in Spokane.

== See also ==
- List of NCAA Division I basketball arenas
