= Tonasket High School =

Location
- 35 HS Highway 20; Tonasket, Washington 98855; United States
- 48°42′08″N 119°25′57″W

Information
- Type: Public Secondary
- Motto: "Home of the Tigers."
- School district: Tonasket School District
- NCES School ID: 530894001530
- Principal: Trisha Roach
- Teaching staff: 25.60 (FTE)
- Grades: 9-12
- Enrollment: 321 (2023-2024)
- Student to teacher ratio: 12.54
- Campus: Rural
- Colors: Blue & Gold
- Athletics: WIAA 2B
- Mascot: Tigers
- Rival: Oroville Hornets
- Website: hs.tonasket.wednet.edu/home

Tonasket High School is located in Tonasket, Washington about 25 miles south of the Canada–US border and 160 miles west of Spokane. The elementary, middle, and high school are all located on the same property; grades 6-12 share a spacious library and resource center. The Outreach Program provides parents with the opportunity to supervise and instruct their children at home while having the professional guidance of a certified teacher. The school's athletic teams are the Tonasket Tigers and the Lady Tigers. The school is home to the award-winning Tonasket School Marching Band, which traveled to Anaheim, California in March 2011 to perform at Disneyland and meet with actor/musician Jack Black, who personally donated $10,000 to help fund the trip.

== Notable alumni ==
- Walter Houser Brattain, recipient of the 1956 Nobel Prize in Physics; attended for two years.
- Dave Holmes, football player, coach, and college athletics administrator.
