= Dick Zornes =

American football player, coach, and college athletics administrator

Biographical details
- Born: June 15, 1944 (age 82)

Playing career
- 1963–1966: Eastern Washington State
- Positions: Safety, fullback

Coaching career (HC unless noted)
- 1967: Eastern Washington State (SA)
- 1968: Hawaii (assistant)
- 1970s: Montana Tech (assistant)
- 1970s: BC Lions (assistant)
- 1977–1978: Columbia Basin
- 1979–1993: Eastern Washington

Administrative career (AD unless noted)
- 1990–1993: Eastern Washington
- 1993–1997: Eastern Washington (asst. AD)
- 1997–1999: Eastern Washington

Head coaching record
- Overall: 89–66–2 (college); 17–3 (junior college)
- Tournaments: 1–2 (NCAA D-I-AA playoffs)

Accomplishments and honors

Championships
- 1 NWCCC (1978); 1 Big Sky (1992); 1 NWCCC Eastern Division (1977); 1 NWCCC Southern Division (1978)

Dick Zornes (born June 15, 1944) is an American former football player, coach, and college athletics administrator. He was the head coach at Eastern Washington University in Cheney from 1979 to 1993, compiling a 89–66–2 (.573) record. Zornes also served two stints as the athletic director at EWU from 1990 to 1993 and again from 1997 to 1999. A native of Vancouver, Washington, he played college football at Eastern Washington—then Eastern Washington State College—from 1963 to 1966 as a safety and fullback for the Savages, then an NAIA program in the Evergreen Conference.

Zornes continued at his alma mater in 1967 as a student coach under Dave Holmes and moved with Holmes to the University of Hawaii in 1968. Zornes was later an assistant coach at Montana College of Mineral Science and Technology—now known as Montana Technological University—in Butte and with the BC Lions of the Canadian Football League (CFL). He was hired as the head coach at Columbia Basin College, a junior college in Pasco, Washington, in 1977. In two seasons at Columbia Basin he tallied a mark of 17–3.

== Head coaching record ==
=== College ===
Year	Team	Overall	Conference	Standing	Bowl/playoffs	NCAA^{#}	TSN^{°}
Eastern Washington Eagles (NCAA Division II independent) (1979–1983)
1979	Eastern Washington	7–2					
1980	Eastern Washington	6–4					
1981	Eastern Washington	7–3					
1982	Eastern Washington	8–2					
1983	Eastern Washington	5–5					
Eastern Washington Eagles (NCAA Division I-AA independent) (1984–1986)
1984	Eastern Washington	7–2–1					
1985	Eastern Washington	9–3			L NCAA Division I-AA Quarterfinal	11	
1986	Eastern Washington	6–5					
Eastern Washington Eagles (Big Sky Conference) (1987–1993)
1987	Eastern Washington	4–7	2–6	8th			
1988	Eastern Washington	2–8–1	2–6	8th			
1989	Eastern Washington	4–6	4–4	5th			
1990	Eastern Washington	5–6	3–5	T–5th			
1991	Eastern Washington	5–6	4–4	T–4th			
1992	Eastern Washington	7–4	6–1	T–1st	L NCAA Division I-AA First Round	14	
1993	Eastern Washington	7–3	5–2	T–2nd			20
Eastern Washington:		89–66–2	26–26				
Total:		89–66–2					
National championship Conference title Conference division title or championship game berth

=== Junior college ===
Year	Team	Overall	Conference	Standing	Bowl/playoffs
Columbia Basin Hawks (Northwest Community College Conference) (1977–1978)
1977	Columbia Basin	7–3	7–1	1st (Eastern)	
1978	Columbia Basin	10–0	7–0	1st (Southern)	
Columbia Basin:		17–3	14–1		
Total:		17–3			
National championship Conference title Conference division title or championship game berth
