= Vin Eustis =

American football and basketball coach (1893–1970)

Biographical details
- Born: November 3, 1893; Beloit, Wisconsin, U.S.
- Died: January 17, 1970 (aged 76); Oakland, California, U.S.

Playing career

Football
- 1912: Pomona
- 1913–1914: Washington State

Coaching career (HC unless noted)

Football
- 1920–1926: Cheney Normal

Basketball
- 1919–1927: Cheney Normal

Administrative career (AD unless noted)
- 1920–1927: Cheney Normal

Head coaching record
- Overall: 24–25–1 (football); 106–44 (basketball)

Accomplishments and honors

Championships
- Football; 4 Spokane / Columbia Valley (1921, 1923–1925); 1 Tri-Normal (1925)

Alvin Allen "Vin" Eustis (November 3, 1893 – January 17, 1970) was an American college football and college basketball coach and athletics administrator. He served as the head football coach at State Normal School at Cheney—now known as Eastern Washington University—from 1920 to 1926, compiling a record of 24–25–1. Eustis was also the head basketball coach at Cheney Normal from 1919 to 1917, tallying a mark of 106–44, and the school's athletic director from 1920 to 1927.

Eustis was born November 3, 1893, in Beloit, Wisconsin, to George H. and Anna Elizabeth (Reynolds) Eustis. He played football at Pomona College and the State College of Washington—now known as Washington State University. He graduated from Washington State with a Bachelor of Arts degree in 1915. Eustis died on January 17, 1970, at a hospital in Oakland, California, following an illness of four months.

== Head coaching record ==
=== Football ===
Year	Team	Overall	Conference	Standing	Bowl/playoffs
Cheney Normal / Cheney Normal Savages (Spokane Intercollegiate Conference) (1920–1921)
1920	Cheney Normal	5–2	5–2	2nd	
1921	Cheney Normal	3–3	3–0	1st	
Cheney Normal / Cheney Normal Savages (Spokane Intercollegiate Conference / Columbia Valley Conference / Tri-Normal Conference) (1922–1923)
1922	Cheney Normal	1–5	1–2 / 0–1	3rd / T–2nd	
1923	Cheney Normal	5–2	3–0 / 1–1	1st / 2nd	
1924	Cheney Normal	3–4–1	2–0–1 / 1–1	T–1st / 2nd	
1925	Cheney Normal	6–3	3–0 / 2–0	1st / 1st	
Cheney Normal Savages (Tri-Normal Conference) (1926)
1926	Cheney Normal	1–6	0–2	3rd	
Cheney Normal:		24–25–1	21–9–1		
Total:		24–25–1			
National championship Conference title Conference division title or championship game berth
