= Spokane Junior College =

Two-year college in Spokane, Washington (1935–1942)

- Type: Two year
- Active: 1935–1942
- Location: Spokane, Washington, United States; 47.627705°N 117.399327°W

Spokane Junior College was a two-year college that operated from 1935 to 1942 on the South Hill of Spokane, Washington. Originally known as Spokane Valley Junior College, it was a reorganization of Spokane University, which was located in the Spokane Valley.

Spokane Junior College leased the buildings formerly used by Spokane College from the Norwegian Lutheran Church of America. Facing decreased enrollment and increased operations costs during World War II, the college shut down in 1942 and merged with Whitworth College (now Whitworth University). The building was torn down in 1969 to make way for the Manito Shopping Center, which presently occupies the site.
