= Ed Chissus =

American football and baseball coach (1917–1987)

Biographical details
- Born: August 1, 1917
- Died: December 30, 1987 (aged 70); Spokane, Washington, U.S.

Playing career

Football
- 1937–1938: Eastern Washington
- Position: End

Coaching career (HC unless noted)

Football
- 1953–1962: Eastern Washington

Baseball
- 1954–1981: Eastern Washington

Head coaching record
- Overall: 29–52–4 (football); 300–439 (baseball)

Ed C. Chissus (August 1, 1917 – December 30, 1987) was an American football and baseball coach. He served as the head football coach at his alma mater, Eastern Washington University, from 1953 to 1962, compiling a record of 29–52–4. He also served as the school's head baseball coach, amassing 300 career victories before retiring in 1981.

Chissus died of cancer on December 30, 1987, at Southcrest Convalescent Center, in Spokane, Washington.

== Head coaching record ==
=== Football ===
Year	Team	Overall	Conference	Standing	Bowl/playoffs
Eastern Washington Savages (Evergreen Conference) (1953–1962)
1953	Eastern Washington	6–2	4–2	3rd	
1954	Eastern Washington	1–8	1–5	6th	
1955	Eastern Washington	4–4	3–3	4th	
1956	Eastern Washington	5–2–1	3–2–1	2nd	
1957	Eastern Washington	5–2–1	3–2–1	4th	
1958	Eastern Washington	4–4	2–3	4th	
1959	Eastern Washington	2–6–1	1–3–1	T–5th	
1960	Eastern Washington	2–7	1–5	6th	
1961	Eastern Washington	0–9	0–7	6th	
1962	Eastern Washington	0–8–1	0–6–1	6th	
Eastern Washington:		29–52–4	18–38–4		
Total:		29–52–4			
