= 1934 Cheney Normal Savages football team =

American college football season

1934 Cheney Normal Savages football

Tri-Normal Conference champion
- Conference: Tri-Normal Conference
- Record: 6–1 (2–0 Tri-Normal)
- Head coach: Red Reese (5th season)

1934 Tri-Normal Conference football standings
	Conf.					Overall
Team	W		L		T	W		L		T
Cheney Normal $	2	–	0	–	0	6	–	1	–	0
Bellingham Normal	0	–	1	–	1	2	–	2	–	3
Ellensburg Normal	0	–	1	–	1	3	–	3	–	2
$ – Conference champion

The 1934 Cheney Normal Savages football team represented the State Normal School at Cheney—now known as Eastern Washington University—as member of the Tri-Normal Conference during the 1934 college football season. Led by fifth-year head coach Red Reese, the Savages compiled an overall record of 6–1 with a mark of 2–0 in conference play, winning the Tri-Normal title.

== Schedule ==
Date	Time	Opponent	Site	Result	Attendance	Source
September 22		Whitworth*	Woodward Field; Cheney, WA	W 63–0		
September 28		at Gonzaga*	Gonzaga Stadium; Spokane, WA	L 0–31	3,500	
October 13		Idaho freshman*	Woodward Field; Cheney, WA	W 26–6		
October 19		at Lewiston Normal*	Lewiston, ID	W 33–0		
October 27	2:00 p.m.	Ellensburg Normal	Woodward Field; Cheney, WA	W 8–0		
November 3	2:00 p.m.	at Washington State freshman*	Rogers Field; Pullman, WA	W 6–0		
November 10		at Bellingham Normal	Waldo Field; Bellingham, WA	W 12–7		
*Non-conference game; All times are in Pacific time; Source:
