= John Massengale =

American football player and coach (1939–2013)

Biographical details
- Born: 1939; Pontiac, Michigan, U.S.
- Died: November 27, 2013; Spokane, Washington, U.S.

Playing career
- 1959: Northwest Missouri State
- 1961–1962: Northwest Missouri State
- Position: Tackle

Coaching career (HC unless noted)
- ?: New Mexico (assistant)
- 1969–1970: Eastern Washington (DC)
- 1971–1978: Eastern Washington

Head coaching record
- Overall: 35–39–1

Accomplishments and honors

Championships
- 1 Evergreen (1974)

John Massengale (1939 – November 27, 2013) was an American football coach. He served as the head football coach at Eastern Washington University in Cheney, Washington from 1971 to 1978, compiling a record of 35–39–1.

Massengale played college football at Northwest Missouri State College — now known as Northwest Missouri State University — lettering for two years as a two-way tackle. He began his coaching career at the high school level in Kansas and Illinois before moving on to the University of New Mexico, where he worked as an assistant coach for the freshman football team and earned a doctorate degree. Massengale joined the football coaching staff at Eastern Washington in 1969 as defensive coordinator under head coach Brent Wooten.

Massengale was born in Pontiac, Michigan, in 1939. He died on November 27, 2013.

== Head coaching record ==
| Year | Team | Overall | Conference | Standing | Bowl/playoffs |
|---|---|---|---|---|---|
Eastern Washington Savages (Evergreen Conference) (1971–1978)
| 1971 | Eastern Washington | 5–5 | 3–2 | 3rd | |
| 1972 | Eastern Washington | 3–7 | 2–4 | T–4th | |
| 1973 | Eastern Washington | 5–4 | 2–4 | 5th | |
| 1974 | Eastern Washington | 4–5 | 4–2 | 1st | |
| 1975 | Eastern Washington | 3–6 | 2–3 | 6th | |
| 1976 | Eastern Washington | 4–4–1 | 3–2–1 | 3rd | |
| 1977 | Eastern Washington | 5–4 | 3–3 | T–3rd | |
| 1978 | Eastern Washington | 6–4 | 4–2 | 2nd | |
| Eastern Washington: | | 35–39–1 | 23–22–1 | | |
| Total: | | 35–39–1 | | | |
National championship Conference title Conference division title or championship game berth
