= 1937 Eastern Washington Savages football team =

American college football season

1937 Eastern Washington Savages football

Tri-Normal champion
- Conference: Tri-Normal Conference
- Record: 6–1 (2–0 Tri-Normal)
- Head coach: Red Reese (8th season)

1937 Tri-Normal Conference football standings
	Conf.					Overall
Team	W		L		T	W		L		T
Eastern Washington $	2	–	0	–	0	6	–	1	–	0
Western Washington	1	–	1	–	0	4	–	2	–	1
Central Washington	0	–	2	–	0	3	–	4	–	0
$ – Conference champion

The 1937 Eastern Washington Savages football team represented Eastern Washington College of Education—now known as Eastern Washington University—as a member of the Tri-Normal Conference during the 1937 college football season. Led by eighth-year head coach Red Reese, the Savages compiled an overall record of 6–1 with a mark of 2–0 in conference play, winning the Tri-Normal title for the fourth consecutive season.

== Schedule ==
Date	Time	Opponent	Site	Result	Attendance	Source
September 24	2:45 p.m.	Linfield*	Cheney, WA	W 13–7		
October 1		Lewiston Normal*	Cheney, WA	W 38–0		
October 15	8:00 p.m.	at Gonzaga*	Gonzaga Stadium; Spokane, WA	L 0–37	5,000	
October 22		Whitworth*	Cheney, WA	W 26–0		
October 30		at Central Washington	Ellensburg, WA	W 18–0		
November 6		Western Washington	Cheney, WA	W 13–6		
November 11	2:00 p.m.	at Pacific Lutheran*	Athletic park; Tacoma, WA	W 6–0		
*Non-conference game; All times are in Pacific time
