= Aaron Best (American football) =

American football player and coach (born 1978)

Current position
- Title: Head coach
- Team: Eastern Washington
- Conference: Big Sky
- Record: 57–47

Biographical details
- Born: January 27, 1978 (age 48); Tacoma, Washington, U.S.

Playing career
- 1996–1999: Eastern Washington
- Positions: Center, long snapper

Coaching career (HC unless noted)
- 2000: Eastern Washington (SA)
- 2001: Eastern Washington (GA)
- 2002–2006: Eastern Washington (OL)
- 2007: Toronto Argonauts (OL)
- 2008–2016: Eastern Washington (OC/OL)
- 2017–present: Eastern Washington

Head coaching record
- Overall: 57–47
- Tournaments: 4–3 (NCAA D-I playoffs)

Accomplishments and honors

Championships
- 1 Big Sky (2018)

Awards
- Big Sky Coach of the Year (2018)

Aaron Best (born January 27, 1978) is an American football coach and former player. He is the head coach at Eastern Washington University, his alma mater, promoted from offensive coordinator in January 2017.

== Playing career ==
Best graduated in 1996 from Curtis Senior High School in Tacoma, Washington, where he had a 3.75 grade point average. He was a co-captain his senior season as Curtis won the State 3A football championship.

Best spent four years at Eastern Washington as a long snapper and center. He started 22 straight games as a junior and senior, earning First Team All-Big Sky Conference and Honorable Mention All-American honors.

== Coaching career ==
From 2000 to 2001, Best served as a student/graduate assistant at Eastern Washington. From 2002 to 2006, Best served as the offensive line coach, during which time he helped develop 2005 NFL draft selection Michael Roos, who was taken in the second round by the Tennessee Titans.

In 2007, Best became the offensive line coach for the Toronto Argonauts of the Canadian Football League (CFL). The next year in 2008, Best returned to EWU as the offensive coordinator and offensive line coach under new head coach Beau Baldwin. Best was part of the coaching staff in 2010, when the Eagles won the FCS national championship.

When Baldwin left after the 2016 season to become the offensive coordinator at California, Best was named co-interim head coach on January 16, 2017. Four days later, Best was promoted to head coach.

== Head coaching record ==
Year	Team	Overall	Conference	Standing	Bowl/playoffs	TSN^{#}	Coaches^{°}
Eastern Washington Eagles (Big Sky Conference) (2017–present)
2017	Eastern Washington	7–4	6–2	T–3rd		21	22
2018	Eastern Washington	12–3	7–1	T–1st	L NCAA Division I Championship	2	2
2019	Eastern Washington	7–5	6–2	T–3rd			
2020–21	Eastern Washington	5–2	5–1	2nd	L NCAA Division I First Round	10	11
2021	Eastern Washington	10–3	6–2	T–3rd	L NCAA Division I Second Round	7	9
2022	Eastern Washington	3–8	2–6	T–8th			
2023	Eastern Washington	4–7	3–5	T–9th			
2024	Eastern Washington	4–8	3–5	T–6th			
2025	Eastern Washington	5–7	4–4	T–6th			
Eastern Washington:		57–47	42–28				
Total:		57–47					
National championship Conference title Conference division title or championship game berth
