= Paul Wulff =

American football player and coach (born 1967)

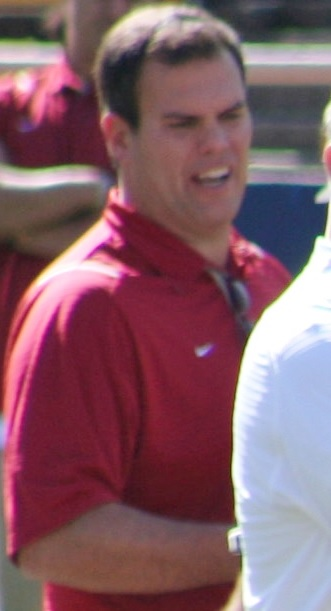

Biographical details
- Born: February 25, 1967 (age 59); Woodland, California, U.S.

Playing career
- 1986–1989: Washington State
- 1991: Raleigh–Durham Skyhawks
- 1992: New York/New Jersey Knights
- Position: Center

Coaching career (HC unless noted)
- 1993: Eastern Washington (VA)
- 1994–1997: Eastern Washington (OL)
- 1998–1999: Eastern Washington (OC/OL)
- 2000–2007: Eastern Washington
- 2008–2011: Washington State
- 2012–2013: San Francisco 49ers (OA)
- 2014: South Florida (OC/OL)
- 2015: Iowa State (VA)
- 2016–2018: Sacramento State (AHC/RGC/OL)
- 2019: UC Davis (VA)
- 2020–2022: Cal Poly (OL/RGC)
- 2023–2025: Cal Poly

Head coaching record
- Overall: 72–104
- Tournaments: 2–3 (I-AA/FCS playoffs)

Accomplishments and honors

Championships
- 2 Big Sky (2004, 2005)

Awards
- 3× Big Sky Coach of the Year (2001, 2004, 2005) 1x Second-team All-Pac-10 (1989) 1x Sporting News All-America honorable mention (1989)

Paul Louis Wulff (born February 25, 1967) is an American football coach and former player who most recently served as the head football coach at California Polytechnic State University from 2022 until 2025. Wulff previously served as the head coach at Eastern Washington University from 2000 to 2007 and at Washington State University from 2008 to 2011. As a student-athlete, he played on the offensive line at Washington State during the late 1980s, earning honorable mention All-American honors following his senior season in 1989.

Since his exodus from Eastern Washington in December 2007, Sacramento State in 2017 is the only college football team Paul Wulff has been a part of that finished a season with a winning record.

== Early life and playing career ==
Born in Woodland, California, Wulff graduated from Davis Senior High School in Davis in 1985. Following his senior year, Wulff was selected to the Optimist All-Star Football Game held in Hughes Stadium. He accepted a scholarship from head coach Jim Walden to attend Washington State University in Pullman, and redshirted his first year in 1985. Wulff started four games at guard for the Cougars as a redshirt freshman in 1986. Later a center, he was a starter on the offensive line from 1986 to 1989 under three different head coaches: Walden, Dennis Erickson, and Mike Price.

During his junior year in 1988, the Cougars were led by Erickson and quarterback Timm Rosenbach, and scored an upset over top-ranked UCLA on the road, the first of five consecutive wins to close out the season. WSU tied for third in the Pac-10, and won the Apple Cup and the Aloha Bowl. It was Washington State's first bowl game in seven years and their first post-season victory in 63 years, since the Rose Bowl in January 1916. WSU finished at 9–3 and sixteenth in both major polls.

In his senior year under Price, the Cougars won six of their first seven games and were ranked fifteenth in mid-October. After two close losses, Wulff had an emergency appendectomy on Halloween and missed the final two games, both defeats, and WSU finished at 6–5 with no bowl. Still, Wulff was selected for All-Pac-10 Second Team status and Sporting News All-America honorable mention in 1989.

Following graduation in 1990, Wulff signed as an undrafted free agent with the New York Jets of the National Football League (NFL), but was released during the 1990 preseason. During the spring of 1991, he played for the Raleigh–Durham Skyhawks in the newly created World League of American Football (WLAF). The team went winless (0–10) in its inaugural season and was folded. Wulff continued to play for another season in the league with the New York/New Jersey Knights, before ending his active career.

== Coaching career ==
=== Eastern Washington ===
Wulff began his coaching career in 1993 as a volunteer assistant under head coach Dick Zornes at Eastern Washington University in Cheney. Zornes retired after that season and assistant coach Mike Kramer was promoted to head coach, who hired Wulff to a full-time position. After four seasons as the Eagles' offensive line and strength coach, Wulff added offensive coordinator duties in 1998. When Kramer departed for conference rival Montana State after the 1999 season, the school named Wulff his successor. During his eight seasons as EWU's head coach, Wulff compiled an overall record of 53 wins and 40 losses; the Eagles won two Big Sky Conference co-championships (2004 and 2005) and appeared three times in the Division I-AA (FCS) playoffs. Wulff earned Big Sky Coach of the Year honors in 2001, 2004, and 2005.

=== Washington State ===
Wulff returned to his alma mater after the 2007 season when he was named the 31st head football coach at Washington State on December 10. He was the second alumnus to head the Cougar football program, after Phil Sarboe in the late 1940s. After compiling a 9–40 record during four losing seasons at WSU, Wulff was fired on November 29, 2011, and left with the lowest winning percentage (.184) in school history. His teams only won four games in Pacific-10 Conference play, including a winless 0–9 conference mark in 2009—part of an overall record of 1–11, the worst in the school's modern football history. The next three head coaches Washington State hired were Mike Leach, Nick Rolovich, and Jake Dickert, who would all go on to have at least one winning season while coaching the Cougars. On February 19, 2024, All Coug'd Up (a Washington State news and opinion site sponsored by the FanSided Network) published an article titled "The 3 worst head coach hires in Washington State football history"; Paul Wulff ranked the worst. The article opened up with an opening statement, "A former Cougar himself, Paul Wulff is among the worst coaches in collegiate football history, much less in the Washington State record books."

=== San Francisco 49ers ===
In May 2012, Wulff joined former Pac-10 foe Jim Harbaugh as an offensive assistant with the San Francisco 49ers, with multiple duties on that side of the ball.

=== South Florida ===
In January 2014, he was hired as the offensive coordinator and offensive line coach at the University of South Florida in Tampa.

=== Sacramento State ===
In February 2016 he was hired as the Sacramento State assistant head coach/offensive line coach.

=== Cal Poly ===
Following almost three years as an offensive line assistant for the Mustangs, Wulff was named head coach at Cal Poly in December 2022 by Athletic Director, Don Oberhelman. Cal Poly's first season under Wulff saw no improvement from the previous season in the win-loss column in conference play. Cal Poly's lone conference win came in a one score victory over a winless Northern Colorado team. Cal Poly's two nonconference victories came against a San Diego team which does not award athletic scholarships to football players, and against a non NCAA or NAIA Lincoln team which has been likened to "the college Bishop Sycamore". Cal Poly finished the 2023 season with the 11th (out of 12 teams) ranked scoring offense in the Big Sky Conference with 20.55 points per game.

Cal Poly's second year under Wulff did not see any improvement from Wulff's first year in the overall win-loss column. One of Cal Poly's wins in 2024 came against a Division II Western Oregon Wolves team that finished their 2024 season one game above .500. Cal Poly's two other wins in 2024 came against conference foes Northern Colorado and Sacramento State that finished their 2024 seasons with a combined record of 2-14 in conference play. Cal Poly finished the 2024 season with the 11th (out of 12 teams) ranked scoring offense in the Big Sky Conference with 20.73 points per game.

Cal Poly's third season under Wulff saw little improvement from the previous season in the overall win-loss column. Cal Poly's two nonconference victories came against the same San Diego team (which does not award athletic scholarships to football players) it beat two seasons ago, and against the same Division II Western Oregon Wolves team it beat in the previous season.

Wulff had a record of 2–4 versus in-state rivals UC Davis and Sacramento State as Cal Poly's Head Coach.

On November 23, 2025, Wulff was fired as head coach at Cal Poly, a day after the Mustangs won at home against Eastern Washington, 43–34. Wulff finished his tenure at Cal Poly with a record of 10–24 in three seasons.

== Personal life ==
As a youth, Wulff's mother went missing. Although her body was discovered in 1979, 48 days after her disappearance, it was not correctly identified until 2020. The youngest of four children, he went to live with relatives, first with an uncle, then with his oldest brother.

Wulff met his first wife Tammy Allen at WSU and they married in 1993. Diagnosed with inoperable brain cancer in early 1997, she battled for over five years, but succumbed in March 2002. Wulff and his second wife Sherry have three children.

== Head coaching record ==
Year	Team	Overall	Conference	Standing	Bowl/playoffs
Eastern Washington Eagles (Big Sky Conference) (2000–2007)
2000	Eastern Washington	6–5	5–2	5th	
2001	Eastern Washington	7–4	3–4	5th	
2002	Eastern Washington	6–5	3–4	4th	
2003	Eastern Washington	6–5	3–4	6th	
2004	Eastern Washington	9–4	6–1	T–1st	L NCAA Division I-AA Quarterfinal
2005	Eastern Washington	7–5	5–2	T–1st	L NCAA Division I-AA First Round
2006	Eastern Washington	3–8	2–5	T–6th	
2007	Eastern Washington	9–4	5–2	2nd	L NCAA Division I Quarterfinal
Eastern Washington:		53–40	32–24		
Washington State Cougars (Pacific-10/Pac-12 Conference) (2008–2011)
2008	Washington State	2–11	1–8	9th	
2009	Washington State	1–11	0–9	10th	
2010	Washington State	2–10	1–8	10th	
2011	Washington State	4–8	2–7	6th (North)	
Washington State:		9–40	4–32		
Cal Poly Mustangs (Big Sky Conference) (2023–2025)
2023	Cal Poly	3–8	1–7	11th	
2024	Cal Poly	3–8	2–6	10th	
2025	Cal Poly	4–8	2–6	T–8th	
Cal Poly:		10–24	5–19		
Total:		72–104			
National championship Conference title Conference division title or championship game berth
