= Swoop (Eastern Washington University) =

Athletics mascot

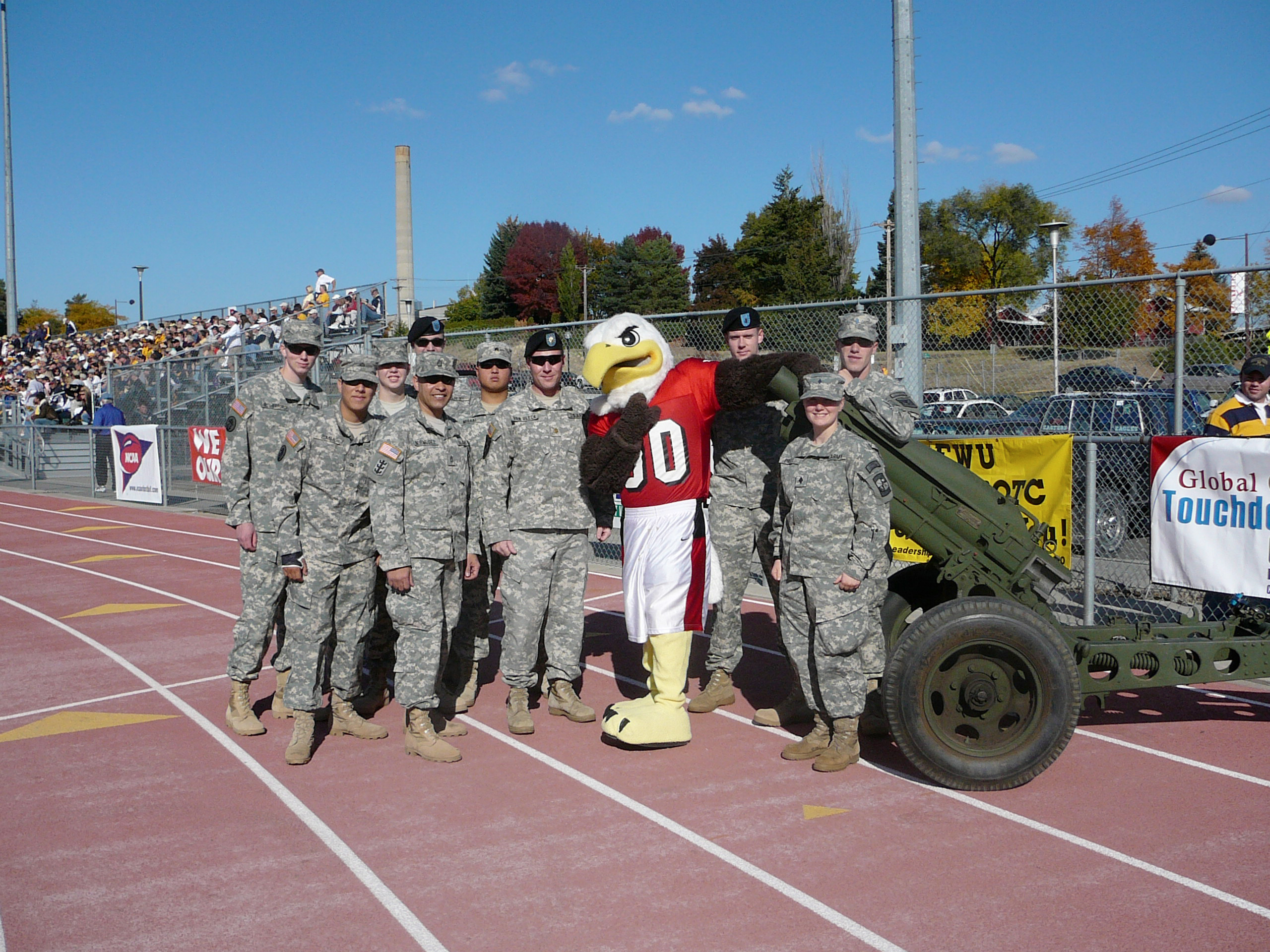
- Swoop with members of the Reserve Officers' Training Corps at Eastern Washington University
- University: Eastern Washington University
- Conference: BSC
- Description: Eagle
- First seen: September 29, 1973

Swoop is Eastern Washington University's athletics mascot. He is modeled after an eagle, in reference to the nickname of the university's athletic teams, the Eagles. The mascot first appeared in September 1973 when the Eastern Washington State College changed the name of its athletic teams from "the Savages" to "the Eagles". The name "Swoop" was subsequently adopted in 2004.
