= Beau Baldwin =

American gridiron football player and coach (born 1972)

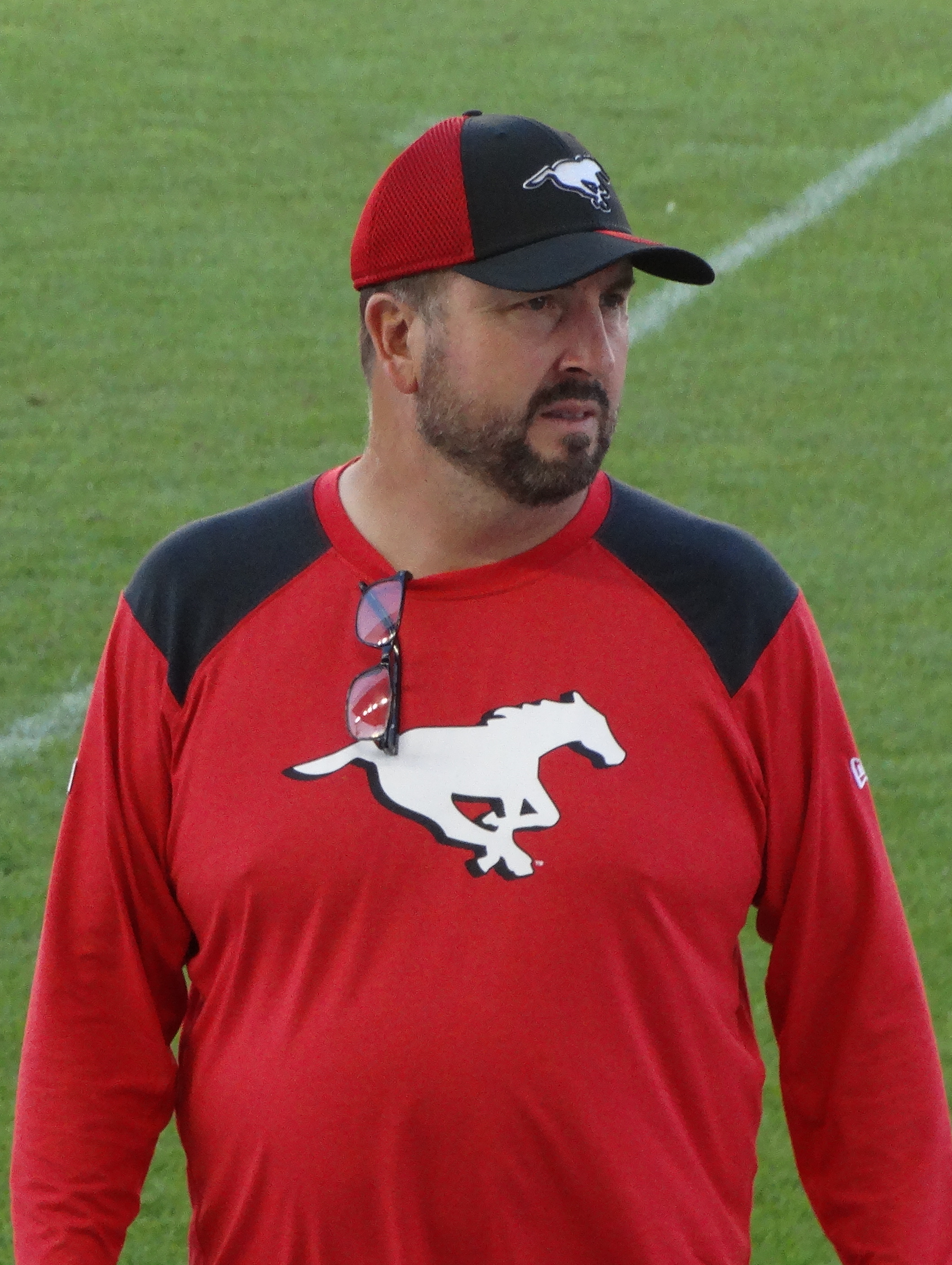
- Baldwin with the Calgary Stampeders in 2024

Biographical details
- Born: May 21, 1972 (age 54); Santa Barbara, California, U.S.

Playing career
- 1990–1993: Central Washington
- 1994: Limhamn Griffins
- Position: Quarterback

Coaching career (HC unless noted)
- 1994–2002: Central Washington (QB)
- 2003–2006: Eastern Washington (OC/QB)
- 2007: Central Washington
- 2008–2016: Eastern Washington
- 2017: California (AHC/OC/RB)
- 2018: California (AHC/OC)
- 2019: California (OC/QB)
- 2020–2022: Cal Poly
- 2023: Arizona State (OC/QB)
- 2024: Calgary Stampeders (QB)

Head coaching record
- Overall: 99–56
- Tournaments: 2–1 (NCAA D-II playoffs); 11–5 (NCAA D-I playoffs)

Accomplishments and honors

Championships
- 1 NCAA Division I (2010); 5 Big Sky (2010, 2012–2014, 2016)

Awards
- 2× Big Sky Coach of the Year (2012, 2013)

Beau Daniel Baldwin (born May 21, 1972) is an American football coach and former player. He most recently served as quarterbacks coach for the Calgary Stampeders of the Canadian Football League (CFL). Previously, he was also the head football coach for the Cal Poly Mustangs, a position he held from December 2019 to 2022. Baldwin previously served as the head football coach at Central Washington University in 2007 and at Eastern Washington University from 2008 to 2016. He led the 2010 Eastern Washington Eagles football team to an NCAA Division I Football Championship. Baldwin was the offensive coordinator for the California Golden Bears from 2017 to 2019 and for the Arizona State Sun Devils in 2023.

== Playing career ==
Baldwin graduated from Curtis Senior High School in University Place, Washington in 1990. He played at quarterback and earned three letters in football and three in baseball in his high school career. Baldwin helped lead Curtis to the 1989 Washington State AAA title in football.

Baldwin played college football at Central Washington University, an NAIA program, from 1990 to 1993. As a player, Baldwin was a two-time team captain and completed 121-of-197 passes for 1,655 yards and eight touchdowns. His career completion percentage of .614 is a school record. In a 38–35 win versus Simon Fraser in 1991, he set single-game school records for attempts (52), completions (32), yards (467), total plays (66) and total yards (550). He had a 6-yard touchdown pass with four seconds left to give the Wildcats the win. In his last two seasons, Baldwin served as the backup to future NFL star Jon Kitna.

After college, Baldwin spent a short time in the spring/summer of 1994 playing football professionally in Sweden for the Limhamn Griffins in the Superserien. The league allowed only two American players per team to be on the field at the same time. Baldwin also served as an assistant coach, giving Baldwin a springboard into his coaching career back in the United States after the season.

== Coaching career ==
=== Central Washington ===
Baldwin returned to Central Washington in 1994 as the quarterbacks coach for the Wildcats. He coached Jon Kitna, for whom he served as a backup just a year earlier. In 1995, Kitna, under the tutelage of Baldwin, helped lead Central Washington to a 10–3–1 record and the NAIA Division II National Championship. Kitna received All-American honors and later played 15 seasons in the National Football League (NFL).

Baldwin served as the quarterbacks coach at Central until 2002. In this time, Baldwin coached another All-American quarterback in Zak Hill, who led Central in 2002 to an 11–1 record and a top-five ranking at the NCAA Division II level. Hill later served under Baldwin as his quarterbacks coach when Baldwin took over as head coach at Eastern Washington.

=== Eastern Washington ===
In 2003, Baldwin went to Eastern Washington and spent four seasons with the Eagles as offensive coordinator and quarterbacks coach. In this time, Eastern Washington made two FCS Playoff appearances in 2004 and 2005. Baldwin also coached quarterback Erik Meyer, who won the Walter Payton Award in 2005, the first player from Eastern Washington to win the award.

=== Central Washington (second stint) ===
In 2007, Baldwin returned to Central Washington as the head coach of the Wildcats. In his only season at Central as head coach, Baldwin led Central to a 10–3 record and an appearance in the 2007 NCAA Division II playoffs, where they lost in the quarterfinals to two-time defending Division II National Champion Grand Valley State.

Baldwin's quarterback in 2007 was Mike Reilly, who was one of 24 national candidates for the Harlon Hill Trophy, given to the top player in NCAA Division II football. In 2007, Central Washington averaged 398.5 yards of total offense per game in 2007, including an average of 263.5 passing. Central averaged 31.4 points per game, including five games with at least 40 points.

=== Eastern Washington (second stint) ===
Baldwin returned to Eastern Washington in 2008 as head coach, replacing Paul Wulff, whom Baldwin had served under as offensive coordinator and quarterbacks coach. In Baldwin's first year, Eastern Washington finished 6–5 overall and 5–3 in the Big Sky Conference.

In 2009, Eastern finished with an 8–4 record and advanced to the FCS Playoffs for the fourth time in six seasons, losing in the first round to Stephen F. Austin, 44–33.

In 2010, Baldwin led Eastern Washington to their best season in school history, leading the Eagles to a 13–2 record and the school's first national championship in football, winning the NCAA Division I Football Championship with a 20–19 come-from-behind victory over Delaware in the title game on January 7, 2011, in Frisco, Texas.

In 2011, the Eagles were ravaged by injuries en route to a 6–5 finish, missing the chance to defend their title in the FCS Playoffs. During this season, Eastern had its second Payton Award winner, quarterback Bo Levi Mitchell.

In the 2012 and 2013 seasons, Eastern amassed a 23–6 total record, winning two Big Sky Conference titles, including the school's first outright conference title in 2013. In these two seasons, Eastern made consecutive trips to the FCS Playoffs, losing both times in the semifinal round. Baldwin was named the Big Sky Conference Coach of the Year in both seasons.

In the 2013 season opening game, Baldwin led Eastern Washington to an upset win over FBS #25 Oregon State. Eastern's win is only the third time an FCS team has defeated a ranked FBS opponent in the history of college football. The win proved to be a milestone for Baldwin and the program, delivering a great deal of national media attention to the team and quarterback Vernon Adams, who passed for 411 yards and four touchdowns and ran for 107 yards with two more touchdowns in the victory.

Eastern Washington played the first college football game of the 2014 season at any division in the newly formed FCS Kickoff game against Sam Houston State. The game was nationally televised on ESPN, another milestone for the Eagle football program.

=== California ===
On January 16, 2017, Baldwin was hired as the offensive coordinator for California of the Pac-12 Conference under new head coach Justin Wilcox. In Baldwin's second season at Cal, the Bears’ offensive efficiency ranked as the second worst among all Power Five teams. Under Baldwin, the Cal offense led by their third-string quarterback was shutout for the first time in 20 years in its Pac-12 conference game against Utah on October 26, 2019. As the offensive coordinator for California, the Bears finished the 2017, 2018, and 2019 football seasons with the 11th, 12th, and 12th ranked offenses respectively out of 12 teams in the Pac-12 Conference in Yards Per Game. During those same seasons, the Bears finished with the 10th, 12th, and 12th ranked offenses respectively out of 12 teams in the Pac-12 Conference in Total Points Per Game under Baldwin's offensive leadership.

=== Cal Poly ===
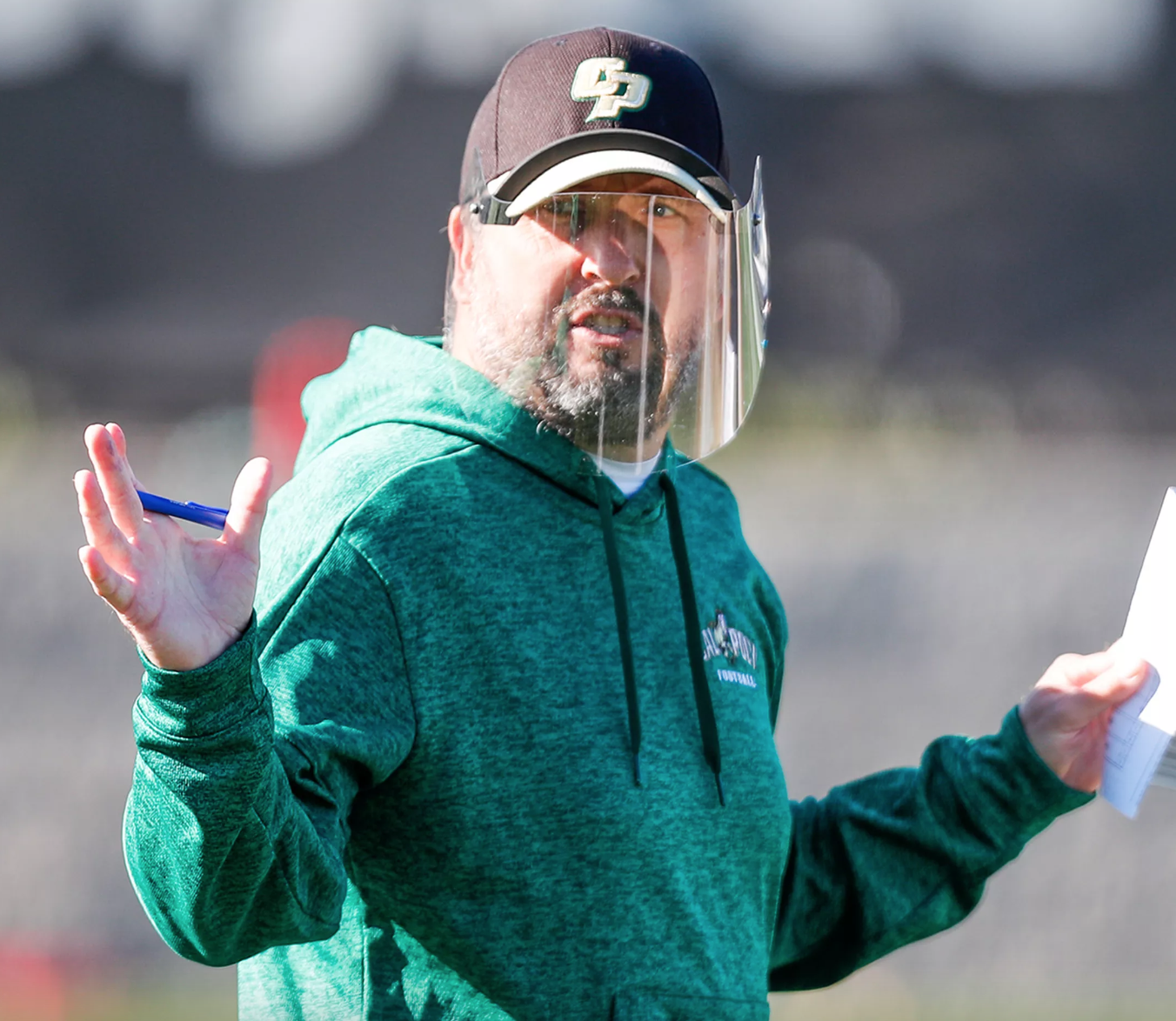
Baldwin with Cal Poly in 2021

On December 10, 2019, Baldwin was hired by Cal Poly as their new head coach, replacing the retired Tim Walsh. Cal Poly President Jeffrey Armstrong introduced Baldwin as head coach and stated on December 11, 2019, "We need football to rise to the level of academics". During the remainder of his tenure with the Mustangs, Baldwin coached his teams to only 4 wins, held a lead in only 9 games, and was outscored by halftime of those games by 429 points. Baldwin finished his time in San Luis Obispo with the fewest number of wins by any Cal Poly head coach through their first 25 games in school history. Baldwin had an 0–5 record versus in-state rivals UC Davis and Sacramento State as Cal Poly's head coach.

=== Arizona State ===
On December 2, 2022, Cal Poly announced the resignation of Baldwin citing that he was accepting the offensive coordinator position at Arizona State under new head coach Kenny Dillingham. Arizona State started the season 1–2 with the offense leaving a lot to be desired. Under Baldwin's offensive play calling, Arizona State suffered its first scoreless home performance since 1988 in a humiliating 29–0 loss to Fresno State. Prior to Arizona State's game against USC, it was reported that Dillingham would take over offensive play calling duties from Baldwin. On November 29, 2023, it was announced that Baldwin would not remain on staff at Arizona State.

=== Calgary Stampeders ===
On March 25, 2024, it was announced that Baldwin had been hired by the Calgary Stampeders to serve as the team's quarterbacks coach. On March 3, 2025 it was announced that Baldwin had stepped down as the Stampeders quarterbacks coach after one season due to personal health issues, former Oregon and CFL quarterback Dakota Prukop was announced as his replacement.

== Head coaching record ==
Year	Team	Overall	Conference	Standing	Bowl/playoffs	TSN^{#}	Coaches^{°}
Central Washington Wildcats (North Central Conference) (2007)
2007	Central Washington	10–3	6–2	3rd	L NCAA Division II Quarterfinal		
Central Washington:		10–3	6–2				
Eastern Washington Eagles (Big Sky Conference) (2008–2016)
2008	Eastern Washington	6–5	5–3	T–3rd			
2009	Eastern Washington	8–4	6–2	T–2nd	L NCAA Division I First Round	13	13
2010	Eastern Washington	13–2	7–1	T–1st	W NCAA Division I Championship	1	1
2011	Eastern Washington	6–5	5–3	T–3rd			
2012	Eastern Washington	11–3	7–1	T–1st	L NCAA Division I Semifinal	4	4
2013	Eastern Washington	12–3	8–0	1st	L NCAA Division I Semifinal	3	3
2014	Eastern Washington	11–3	7–1	1st	L NCAA Division I Quarterfinal	4	4
2015	Eastern Washington	6–5	5–3	T–4th			
2016	Eastern Washington	12–2	8–0	T–1st	L NCAA Division I Semifinal	4	4
Eastern Washington:		85–32	58–14				
Cal Poly Mustangs (Big Sky Conference) (2020–2022)
2020–21	Cal Poly	0–3	0–3	8th			
2021	Cal Poly	2–9	1–7	T–11th			
2022	Cal Poly	2–9	1–7	T–11th			
Cal Poly:		4–21	2–17				
Total:		99–56					
National championship Conference title Conference division title or championship game berth
