= Brent Wooten =

American football player and coach (1939–2011)

Biographical details
- Born: 1939; Anacortes, Washington, U.S.
- Died: August 29, 2011 (aged 71–72); Spokane, Washington, U.S.

Playing career

Football
- 1958–1961: Washington
- Position: Halfback

Coaching career (HC unless noted)

Football
- 1962: Columbia Basin (assistant)
- 1963–1967: Eastern Washington (assistant)
- 1968–1970: Eastern Washington

Wrestling
- 1963–1968: Eastern Washington

Administrative career (AD unless noted)
- 1968–1970: Eastern Washington

Head coaching record
- Overall: 11–18 (football)

Accomplishments and honors

Championships
- Football; 1 Evergreen (1969)

Brent Alan "Wooter" Wooten (1939 – August 29, 2011) was an American college football player and coach. He served as the head football coach at Eastern Washington University in Cheney, Washington from 1968 to 1970, compiling a record of 11–18.

== Head coaching record ==
=== Football ===
Year	Team	Overall	Conference	Standing	Bowl/playoffs
Eastern Washington Savages (Evergreen Conference) (1968–1970)
1968	Eastern Washington	3–7	3–3	2nd	
1969	Eastern Washington	4–5	4–2	T–1st	
1970	Eastern Washington	4–6	3–4	4th	
Eastern Washington:		11–18	10–9		
Total:		11–18			
National championship Conference title Conference division title or championship game berth
