= Red Reese =

American basketball player and coach (1899–1974)

Biographical details
- Born: March 2, 1899; Coldwater, Missouri, U.S.
- Died: April 18, 1974 (aged 75); Othello, Washington, U.S.
- Education: Washington State College (1925)

Playing career

Basketball
- 1921–1925: Washington State

Coaching career (HC unless noted)

Football
- 1930–1941: Cheney Normal / Eastern Washington
- 1942–1944: Second Air Force
- 1946: Eastern Washington

Basketball
- 1925–1928: Cashmere HS (WA)
- 1928–1930: North Central HS (WA)
- 1930–1942: Cheney Normal / Eastern Washington
- 1945–1964: Eastern Washington

Administrative career (AD unless noted)
- 1953–1963: Eastern Washington

Head coaching record
- Overall: 87–30–10 (college football); 468–302 (college basketball); 76–14 (high school basketball)
- Bowls: 1–1

Accomplishments and honors

Championships
- Football; 4 Tri-Normal (1934–1937); 1 WINCO (1939) Basketball; 1 Washington State High School (1930); 12 WINCO/Evergreen Track; 23 WINCO/Evergreen

Awards
- Inland Empire Hall of Fame (1972); WSU Athletic Hall of Fame (1983); EWU Athletics Hall of Fame (1996)
- Military career
- Allegiance: United States
- Branch: U.S. Army Air Forces
- Service years: 1942–1945
- Rank: Major
- Units: Second Air Force, Training
- Conflicts: World War II

William Bryan "Red" Reese (March 2, 1899 – April 18, 1974) was athletic director and coach of multiple sports (football, basketball, and track & field) at Eastern Washington University in Cheney (then named the Cheney State Normal School, later Eastern Washington College of Education, and Eastern Washington State College) from 1930 to 1964.

Reese Court on Eastern's campus was named in his honor in September 1980.

== College playing career ==
"Red" Reese started his playing career as a three sport athlete (basketball, football, and track), taking honors in all three sports. Reese participated in the same three sports for Washington State College from 1921 to 1925. He won his letters for football and basketball as a freshman, and played varsity in both sports all three years following. He was captain of the basketball team for his senior year.

== High school teaching and coaching career ==
Reese coached the basketball team at Cashmere High School from 1925 to 1928, with a record of 44–7 (.863). He then succeeded Jack Friel as basketball and baseball coach at North Central High School in Spokane, where he coached from 1928 to 1930: his 1928–29 team went 17–4 and won the city championship, and his 1929–30 team went 15–3, repeating as city champions and then won the state title. At both Cashmere and North Central, Reese was responsible for coaching all sports and teaching physical education classes.

== Collegiate coaching career (1930–1964) ==
Reese began his collegiate coaching career at Cheney State Normal School in 1930 after leaving his position at North Central, and remained active as a coach (with the exception of his years in the military) until his retirement in 1964.

=== Football ===
Reese coached football at Eastern Washington College of Education from 1930 to 1941 and in 1946. Eastern did not field a team from 1943 to 1945, and Reese served in the Army Air Forces; he ended with a career record of 66–26–9 (.698), winning five conference championships.

=== Basketball ===
Reese is perhaps best known for his work as the basketball coach at Eastern, a job he held for 31 seasons (1930–1942, 1945–1964), with a record of 468–302 (.608). His college teams took twelve conference titles, advanced to the NAIB national tournament in Kansas City three times, and reached the quarterfinals of the NAIB twice. His 1945–46 basketball team won 27 successive games and a conference championship. After forty years of coaching basketball, Reese's total record (combining high school and collegiate records) was 549 wins to 307 losses (.641).

=== Track and field ===
Reese had exceptional success as the track coach at Eastern Washington College of Education: among his successes was leading the track team to six consecutive Evergreen Conference championships from 1947 through 1952. Over his career from 1930 to 1964, his teams won more than 200 meets and 23 conference titles, and at one time held a record for 43 straight dual meet wins.

== Professional career (1930–1964) ==
In addition to his coaching responsibilities, Reese was a member of the faculty of the State Normal School (now known as Eastern Washington University) since 1930. From 1943 to 1950, he worked as an instructor and coach for the Division of Health and Physical Education. In 1948, Reese was responsible for organizing the intramural recreation program at Eastern Washington College of Education (EWCE). He also developed and taught a course called "Organization and Administration of Intramurals and Recreation in the Public Schools." He became head of the Division of Health, Physical Education and Recreation in 1950, and held this position until 1952. In 1951, Reese became an assistant professor in the College of Education. That same year, he was elevated to the position of associate professor, a position he held until his retirement in 1964. Reese was also the director of athletics at EWCE (eventually Eastern Washington State College) from 1953 to 1963. An article published in The Spokesman-Review in 1941 claims to announce Reese's promotion to director of athletics, however EWCE Personnel records don't show him receiving the formal title of athletic director until 1953.

Reese was also one of the athletic directors involved in the early development of the National Association of Intercollegiate Athletics (originally the National Association for Intercollegiate Basketball), serving on the executive board from 1945 to 1953, culminating in service as the NAIA's president in 1952–53, the year in which the association became the first intercollegiate athletics organization to invite historically black colleges and universities to join as members.

== Military service (1942–1945) ==
Reese took an unpaid leave of absence from Eastern Washington College of Education in September 1942 to serve during World War II: he enlisted voluntarily, apparently out of a desire to serve his country, and was commissioned as a captain into the U.S. Army Air Forces. He was initially stationed at Fort George Wright in Spokane, where he was in charge of the Second Air Force's football program. Reese was next stationed in Colorado Springs, where he was the Second Air Force's physical fitness officer. As the chief of the Physical Training Section, he oversaw the organization and administration of the physical education of more than 200,000 airmen at 45 bases across 21 states, and was promoted to the rank of major. His work led him to recognize the need for physical training at the primary and high school level. He foresaw physical education as an area that would rapidly expand to meet the need for improved programs across the nation.

During his military career, Reese coached the Second Air Force Superbomber football team to 20 victories and one tie out of 23 games played during the 1942 and 1943 seasons. These victories include an undefeated 1942 season and a Sun Bowl win against the Hardin–Simmons Cowboys.

== "The Reese Affair" at EWCE (1953) ==
As a result of pressure to impose stricter academic requirements on faculty, which was part of an effort to raise the standards of the institution, William Reese became involved in a controversy on campus that was later known as "The Reese Affair". Reese was a member of the faculty of Cheney State Normal starting in 1930, when the lack of a master's degree was no obstacle to his holding that position, but rising academic standards forced him (and other faculty like him) to seek master's degrees to satisfy the college. In 1951 Reese announced his candidacy for a Master's of Education degree, to be granted by the very institution he was then employed by—E.W.C.E. This raised many questions on campus about the propriety of this situation. Those questions erupted into outrage when Reese was erroneously listed in the college's spring 1953 catalog as holding a Master of Education degree that had not yet been defended or awarded: the Faculty Council demanded an investigation into the situation, as allegations began to rise that Reese had conspired with the college's president and others in the administration to essentially secure the degree without completing all its requirements. Reese withdrew his candidacy for the degree entirely, but the controversy that became known as "the Reese Affair" in the school newspaper and local media continued to unfold: ultimately, while the investigations into these events never turned up any evidence to suggest that Reese had engaged in any misconduct, he was removed as the head of the Health, Recreation, and Physical Education Division (while keeping his AD and coaching responsibilities), and numerous other members of the faculty either resigned or were fired, including Dr. Otis Willard Freeman, the college's president. Despite the board of trustees affirming that "there is no evidence of any work, action, or intent on [Reese's] part indicating his guilt," some in the college and surrounding community were dissatisfied with this outcome; a letter to the editor in a local paper, published a few days after the Board's announcement, asserts hotly that Reese had used "threats and coercion" to intimidate his colleagues and claims that "his clique...is powerful enough to dictate the entire college policy."

== Personal and family life ==
Born in Coldwater, Missouri, Reese was raised in Pullman, Washington, and graduated from Pullman High School in 1920. He then went on to Washington State College, also in Pullman, graduating in 1925.

At the time of his death in Othello in 1974, Reese was survived by his wife Carmen, his sons John M. Reese of Walla Walla and Robert W. Reese of Wenatchee, a daughter, Mrs. Donna Jean Montzhelmer of Seattle, and eight grandchildren. In an interview in 2010, John Reese remarked about his father that "he was a good father who tried to do a lot for his kids, and he did a good job of balancing his coaching with his family."

== Honors and accomplishments ==
According to his obituary, "Reese was a member of the Cheney Masonic Lodge, the Shrine in Spokane, Kappa Sigma Fraternity, the WSU Crimson Circle, the EWSC Scarlet Arrow, and the Othello Rotary Club." Reese was active in a number of local organizations, including the Cheney Kiwanis (1935–1942), the Cheney Chamber of Commerce (1935–1953), and the sports and civics committee of the Spokane Chamber of Commerce (1957–1962).

Reese's former students often joined the coaching ranks themselves—according to one source in 1952, "his [Reese's] boys...now number well over a hundred in the coaching ranks of the Pacific Northwest", although in a letter of recommendation regarding Reese in 1950, a local high school coach claims that "at least two hundred coaches are passing on their athletic ways [who] have been tutored by the congenial 'Red' Head." Regardless of the exact number, the breadth of his influence in the local high school coaching ranks appears to have been considerable.

The 2009 edition of ESPN's College Basketball Encyclopedia, in its entry for Eastern Washington University, named Reese as "Best Coach" in the institution's history.

== Head coaching record ==
=== College football ===
Year	Team	Overall	Conference	Standing	Bowl/playoffs	AP^{#}
Cheney Normal / Eastern Washington Savages (Tri-Normal Conference) (1930–1937)
1930	Cheney Normal	3–4				
1931	Cheney Normal	5–1–2				
1932	Cheney Normal	3–2–3				
1933	Cheney Normal	6–2	1–1	2nd		
1934	Cheney Normal	6–1	2–0	1st		
1935	Cheney Normal	4–2–1	1–0–1	1st		
1936	Cheney Normal	7–1	2–0	1st		
1937	Eastern Washington	6–1	2–0	1st		
Eastern Washington Savages (Washington Intercollegiate Conference) (1938–1941)
1938	Eastern Washington	6–2–1	2–1	2nd		
1939	Eastern Washington	5–3	2–1	T–1st		
1940	Eastern Washington	6–2	3–1	2nd		
1941	Eastern Washington	5–2–1	2–1–1	2nd		
Second Air Force Bombers/Superbombers (Independent) (1942–1944)
1942	Second Air Force	11–0–1			W Sun	
1943	No team					
1944	Second Air Force	10–4–1			L Treasury Bond Bowl	20
Second Air Force:		21–4–2				
Cheney Normal / Eastern Washington Savages (Washington Intercollegiate Conference) (1946)
1946	Eastern Washington	4–3–1	3–1–1	2nd		
Cheney Normal / Eastern Washington:		66–26–9				
Total:		87–30–10				
National championship Conference title Conference division title or championship game berth
