= Eastern Washington Fieldhouse =

Multi-purpose arena in Cheney, Washington

- Eastern Washington Fieldhouse
- Full name: Eastern Washington Fieldhouse
- Location: Cheney, Washington
- Owner: Eastern Washington State College
- Operator: Eastern Washington State College
- Capacity: 5,000

Construction
- Opened: 1949
- Demolished: 1977

Tenant
- Eastern Washington Eagles men's basketball (1949–1975)

Eastern Washington Fieldhouse was a 5,000-seat multi-purpose arena in Cheney, Washington. It was home to the Eastern Washington State College (EWSC) Eagles basketball team until the Reese Court opened in 1975. The facility was destroyed by fire on April 25, 1977.

== Building history ==
The fieldhouse was moved to EWSC in 1947 and opened in 1948. The building had been located 70 miles away at Farragut Naval Training Station in Bayview, Idaho, where it had been used for drill. At EWSC the 800 foot long building was home to a gymnasium and swimming pool.

== Demolition ==
In the fall of 1976 the building was condemned for life safety code violations. EWSC contracted with George Kelp Building Wrecking Company of Spokane for the building's demolition. Old bolts in the building's roof construction could not be removed without cutting them out, and therefore a welder's torch was used.

== The fire ==
At 11:10 am, the Cheney fire department got the call that the Fieldhouse was on fire. Twice before, small fires had been accidentally started by the demolition team. But this fire was different. The fire was started when a spark from a welder's torch found fuel in a pile of the building's dismantled material. With more than half the roof already removed, a "wind tunnel" effect was created as the fire pulled in the oxygen it needed to quickly grow. By 11:12 am, the fire chief was on the scene and sounded a mutual aid alarm. More than 30 firefighters from around the district responded. Within 10 minutes, the entire Fieldhouse was engulfed in flames. The blaze was so hot that reportedly cars parked almost 100 feet away were "scorched." A Cheney fire truck was even damaged by the heat. The firefighters, realizing the building was a complete loss, focused on containment and protecting the surrounding buildings. The fire wasn't under control until 2:00 pm. But winds in the area required crews to remain on scene an additional 12 hours.

In addition to the regular firefighters, there were many students involved. There were 2 fire hoses between the fieldhouse and the ROTC building that were used by the students. Their primary responsibility was protecting the ROTC building. At times they had to turn the hoses up into the eaves of the ROTC building's roof as fires had started there due to the heat. Other groups of students were using garden hoses to wet down those who were on the fire hoses. The heat between the buildings was quite high. Without the cooling from the garden hoses, the students on the fire hoses would not have been able to stay in there as they did not have firefighter's turnouts for protection.

== The aftermath of the fire ==
The Cheney Fire Department Chief Tony Singleton estimated that fire damage to the department's equipment exceeded $6,000. Total damage figures for the ROTC building came out at over $25,000 according to Singleton. The ROTC building's roof was so badly damaged that classes had to be held in another building for nearly a year. Sixteen firemen were treated for smoke inhalation and one fireman was treated for a cut on his hand. According to Singleton the toll of the fire could have been more serious than it turned out to be. Lt. Gene Bloom almost lost his life due to a falling roof shortly after responding to the fire.

Eastern Washington State College sought reimbursement for the $70 million worth of damages to the campus facilities.
