= Dave Holmes (American football) =

American football player, coach, and administrator (1924–1999)

Biographical details
- Born: January 7, 1924
- Died: August 25, 1999 (aged 75) near Avery, Idaho, U.S

Playing career
- 1940s: Whitworth
- Position: Guard

Coaching career (HC unless noted)
- 1952–1954: Tonasket HS (WA)
- 1955–1962: North Central HS (WA)
- 1963–1967: Eastern Washington
- 1968–1973: Hawaii
- 1974–1984: University HS (WA)

Administrative career (AD unless noted)
- 1963–1968: Eastern Washington State

Head coaching record
- Overall: 80–30–2 (college); 95–66–7 (high school)
- Tournaments: 1–1 (NAIA playoffs)

Accomplishments and honors

Championships
- 2 Evergreen (1965–1967)

David Leon Holmes (January 7, 1924 – August 25, 1999) was an American football player, coach, and college athletics administrator. He was the head coach football coach at Eastern Washington State College—now known as Eastern Washington University—from 1963 to 1967, where his record was 34–13–1. Holmes then went on to the University of Hawaii (1968–1973), where he still holds the record for highest career winning percentage (.718). Under Holmes, Hawaii never had a losing season. Holmes was a graduate of Tonasket High School and Whitworth College in Spokane, Washington. Holmes began and ended his head coaching career as a high school coach in Spokane. Prior to his tenure at Eastern Washington, he was the head coach at North Central High School, where he compiled a 35–28–4 record. Holmes finished his coaching career at University High School. His record at University was 60–38–3 from 1974 to 1984. His career prep record was 95–66–7. Holmes died on August 25, 1999, at the age of 75 of an apparent heart attack while fly fishing in Northern Idaho.

== Head coaching record ==
=== College ===
Year	Team	Overall	Conference	Standing	Bowl/playoffs
Eastern Washington Savages (Evergreen Conference) (1963–1967)
1963	Eastern Washington	3–6	2–5	T–4th	
1964	Eastern Washington	5–4	4–3	T–2nd	
1965	Eastern Washington	8–1	4–1	1st	
1966	Eastern Washington	7–1–1	4–1–1	1st	
1967	Eastern Washington	11–1	6–0	1st	L NAIA Championship
Eastern Washington:		34–13–1	20–10–1		
Hawaii Rainbows (NCAA College Division / Division II football independent) (1968–1973)
1968	Hawaii	7–3			
1969	Hawaii	6–3–1			
1970	Hawaii	9–2			
1971	Hawaii	7–4			
1972	Hawaii	8–3			
1973	Hawaii	9–2			
Hawaii:		46–17–1			
Total:		80–30–2			
National championship Conference title Conference division title or championship game berth
