= Arthur C. Woodward =

American baseball player and basketball coach

Biographical details
- Born: June 9, 1883; Taunton, Massachusetts, U.S.
- Died: February 2, 1950 (aged 66); Spokane, Washington, U.S.

Playing career

Baseball
- 1905: Taunton Tigers
- 1906–1907: Fall River Indians
- Position: First baseman

Coaching career (HC unless noted)

Football
- 1912–1917: North Central HS (WA)
- 1927–1928: Cheney Normal

Basketball
- 1927–1930: Cheney Normal

Head coaching record
- Overall: 7–8 (college football); 26–29 (college basketball)

Arthur Clinton "Woody" Woodward (June 9, 1883 – February 2, 1950) was an American minor league baseball player and a football and basketball coach. He spent three seasons playing minor league baseball for teams in New England before embarking on a coaching career. Woodward served as the head football coach at State Normal School at Cheney—now known as Eastern Washington University—from 1927 to 1928, compiling a record of 7–8. He was also the school's head basketball coach from 1927 to 1930, tallying a mark of 26–29.

== Head coaching record ==
=== Football ===
Year	Team	Overall	Conference	Standing	Bowl/playoffs
Cheyney Normal Savages (Tri-Normal League) (1927–1928)
1927	Cheyney Normal	3–5			
1928	Cheyney Normal	4–3			
Cheyney Normal:		7–8			
Total:		7–8			
