= Nick E. Hinch =

Canadian-American professor, college football and college basketball coach (1869–1961)

Biographical details
- Born: September 8, 1869; Canada
- Died: November 12, 1961 (aged 92); Conconully, Washington, U.S.
- Education: Toronto (1898)

Coaching career (HC unless noted)

Football
- 1908: Cheney Normal
- 1912: Cheney Normal

Basketball
- 1905–1906: Cheney Normal

Head coaching record
- Overall: 2–4 (football); 3–6 (basketball)

Nicholas Edward Hinch (September 8, 1869 – November 12, 1961) was a Canadian-American professor of English and a college football and college basketball coach. He was an 1898 graduate of the University of Toronto. He was instrumental in founding the English department at State Normal School at Cheney–now known as Eastern Washington University–in Cheney, Washington. Hinch served the head football coach at Cheney Normal in 1908 and 1912, compiling a record of 2–4. He was also the school's head basketball coach for one season, in 1905–06, tallying a mark of 3–6.

Hinch taught at Cheney Normal from 1903 to 1919. He left Cheney to 1919 to become head of the English department at Washington State Normal School in Ellensburg—now known as Central Washington University. He served in that role until his retirement in 1943. Hinch died on November 12, 1961, at his home in Conconully, Washington.

== Head coaching record ==
=== Football ===
Year	Team	Overall	Conference	Standing	Bowl/playoffs
Cheyney Normal (Independent) (1908)
1908	Cheyney Normal	2–3			
Cheyney Normal (Independent) (1912)
1912	Cheyney Normal	0–1			
Cheyney Normal:		2–4			
Total:		2–4			
