= Eastern Washington Eagles football =

Football team representing Eastern Washington University

2026 Eastern Washington Eagles football team
- First season: 1901; 125 years ago
- Head coach: Aaron Best; 10th season, 57–47 (.548)
- Location: Cheney, Washington
- Stadium: Roos Field (capacity: 8,600)
- Field: The Inferno
- NCAA division: Division I FCS
- Conference: Big Sky
- Colors: Red and white
- All-time record: 588–451–22 (.565)

NCAA Division I FCS championships
- 2010

Conference championships
- Columbia Valley: 1921, 1923, 1924, 1925 Tri-Normal: 1925, 1934, 1935, 1936, 1937 WINCO: 1939, 1947 EvCo: 1948, 1949, 1950, 1965, 1966, 1967, 1969 Big Sky: 1992, 1997, 2004, 2005, 2010, 2012, 2013, 2014, 2016, 2018
- Rivalries: Idaho; Montana (rivalry); Portland State (rivalry)
- Fight song: Go, Eagles, Go
- Mascot: Swoop
- Marching band: Eagles Marching Band
- Outfitter: Adidas
- Website: GoEags.com

The Eastern Washington Eagles football team represents Eastern Washington University in the NCAA Division I Football Championship Subdivision. The Eastern Eagles are members of the Big Sky Conference and play at Roos Field, which is known for being the only stadium in college football with a red playing surface.

== History ==
Conference affiliations
Independent	1901–1919
Columbia Valley Conference	1920–1924
Tri-Normal Conference	1922–1937
Washington Intercollegiate Conference	1938–1947
Evergreen Conference	1948–1979
NCAA Division II independent	1980–1983
NCAA Division I-AA Independent	1984–1986
Big Sky Conference	1987–present

=== Beginning & NAIA era ===
Eastern Washington University began fielding a football team in 1901, when the school was known at the time as the 'State Normal School' and the team mascot was the 'Savages'. Eastern's first national affiliation came with joining the NAIA.

Eastern competed in the NAIA until 1977, along the way advancing to the NAIA Football National Championship finals in 1967, losing to Fairmont State 28–21. This marked Eastern Washington's first appearance in a national championship game at any level of competition.

=== Identity changes ===
During this time period, the school underwent numerous changes to its identity. The school name changed in 1937 to the 'Eastern Washington College of Education', then again in 1962 to 'Eastern Washington State College'. The final change to the school name came in 1977 when the school was renamed 'Eastern Washington University'.

In 1973, the student body voted to make Eastern's mascot the 'Eagles'. Shortly before that, the Eastern Board of Trustees declared 'Savages', its mascot through its first 92 years, no longer acceptable. Eagles are native to Eastern Washington and thus a logical choice for a replacement.

=== Transition to NCAA and Big Sky ===
Eastern joined the NCAA in 1978, and participated at the Division II level as an independent until 1984, when they moved up to Division I-AA (now FCS), also as an independent.

Denied membership to the Big Sky Conference in May 1985, Eastern was extended an invitation in December 1986 to join, starting in July 1987. Eastern continues to participate in the Big Sky to this day and is now the sixth-most tenured member of the conference.

=== Red turf and national championship ===
The 2010 season marked a number of firsts for Eastern Washington's football program. The offseason saw a highly publicized move to install a red turf playing surface, the first of its kind in the country. Eastern utilized the excitement and energy surrounding the program to complete its finest season of competition in the program's history.

The 2010 season concluded with Eastern Washington's first appearance in the FCS Championship Game. Led by the head coach Beau Baldwin the Eagles defeated the Delaware Blue Hens 20–19 in Frisco, Texas to win the school's first national championship in football.

== Championships ==
=== National championships ===
Eastern Washington has won one national championship in the FCS.

Year	Coach	Selector	Record	Opponent	Result
2010	Beau Baldwin	NCAA Division I Football Championship Subdivision	13–2	Delaware	W 20–19

=== Conference championships ===
Eastern Washington has won 28 conference championships since 1901, including ten in the Big Sky Conference.

Year	Conference	Overall record	Conference record	Coach
1921	Spokane Intercollegiate Conference	3–3	3–0	Vin Eustis
1923	Spokane Intercollegiate Conference	5–2	3–0	Vin Eustis
1924†	Columbia Valley Conference	3–4–1	2–0–1	Vin Eustis
1925	Columbia Valley Conference	6–3	3–0	Vin Eustis
1925	Tri-Normal Conference	6–3	2–0	Vin Eustis
1934	Tri-Normal Conference	6–1	2–0	Red Reese
1935	Tri-Normal Conference	4–2–1	1–0–1	Red Reese
1936	Tri-Normal Conference	7–1	2–0	Red Reese
1937	Tri-Normal Conference	6–1	2–0	Red Reese
1939†	Washington Intercollegiate Conference	5–3	2–0	Red Reese
1947†	Washington Intercollegiate Conference	6–1–1	4–0–1	Abe Poffenroth
1948†	Evergreen Conference	8–1	5–1	Abe Poffenroth
1949†	Evergreen Conference	7–2	5–1	Abe Poffenroth
1950	Evergreen Conference	8–2	5–1	Abe Poffenroth
1965	Evergreen Conference	8–1	4–1	Dave Holmes
1966	Evergreen Conference	7–1–1	4–1–1	Dave Holmes
1967	Evergreen Conference	11–1	6–0	Dave Holmes
1969†	Evergreen Conference	4–5	4–2	Brent Wooten
1992†	Big Sky Conference	7–4	6–1	Dick Zornes
1997	Big Sky Conference	12–2	7–1	Mike Kramer
2004†	Big Sky Conference	9–4	6–1	Paul Wulff
2005†	Big Sky Conference	7–5	5–2	Paul Wulff
2010†	Big Sky Conference	13–2	7–1	Beau Baldwin
2012†	Big Sky Conference	11–3	7–1	Beau Baldwin
2013	Big Sky Conference	12–3	8–0	Beau Baldwin
2014	Big Sky Conference	11–3	7–1	Beau Baldwin
2016†	Big Sky Conference	12–2	8–0	Beau Baldwin
2018†	Big Sky Conference	12–3	7–1	Aaron Best

† Co–champions

== Playoff appearances ==
=== NAIA playoffs ===
Eastern Washington made one appearance in the NAIA playoffs in 1967. They advanced to the NAIA Champions Bowl in Morgantown, West Virginia, where they lost to Fairmont State. The Savages finished with a 1–1 record in NAIA playoff play.

Season	Round	Opponent	Result	Head Coach
1967	Semifinals; Champions Bowl	@ New Mexico Highlands @ Fairmont State	W 28–14; L 21–28	Dave Holmes

=== NCAA Division I-AA/FCS playoffs ===
Eastern Washington has fifteen appearances in the I-AA/FCS playoffs since moving up to the division in 1984, with an overall record of 20–14 (.588). Their first appearance occurred the next year, when they advanced to the quarterfinals as an independent. The Eagles' best finish came during the 2010 season, when they won the national championship.

Season	Round	Opponent	Result	Head Coach
1985	First Round; Quarterfinals	@ Idaho @ Northern Iowa	W 42–38; L 14–17	Dick Zornes (1–2)
1992	First Round	@ Northern Iowa	L 14–17	Dick Zornes (1–2)
1997	First Round; Quarterfinals; Semifinals	Northwestern State; Western Kentucky; Youngstown State	W 40–10; W 38–21; L 14–25	Mike Kramer (2–1)
2004	First Round; Quarterfinals	@ Southern Illinois; Sam Houston State	W 35–31; L 34–35	Paul Wulff (2–3)
2005	First Round	@ Northern Iowa	L 38–41	Paul Wulff (2–3)
2007	First Round; Quarterfinals	@ McNeese State @ Appalachian State	W 44–15; L 35–38	Paul Wulff (2–3)
2009	First Round	@ Stephen F. Austin	L 33–44	Beau Baldwin (11–5)
2010	First Round; Quarterfinals; Semifinals; Championship	SE Missouri State; North Dakota State; Villanova vs. Delaware	W 37–17; W 38–31^{OT} W 41–31; W 20–19	Beau Baldwin (11–5)
2012	Second Round; Quarterfinals; Semifinals	Wagner; Illinois State; Sam Houston State	W 29–19; W 51–35; L 42–45	Beau Baldwin (11–5)
2013	Second Round; Quarterfinals; Semifinals	South Dakota State; Jacksonville State; Towson	W 41–17; W 35–24; L 31–35	Beau Baldwin (11–5)
2014	Second Round; Quarterfinals	Montana; Illinois State	W 37–20; L 46–59	Beau Baldwin (11–5)
2016	Second Round; Quarterfinals; Semifinals	Central Arkansas; Richmond; Youngstown State	W 37–20; W 38–0; L 38–40	Beau Baldwin (11–5)
2018	Second Round; Quarterfinals; Semifinals; Championship	Nicholls; UC Davis; Maine vs. North Dakota State	W 42–21; W 34–29; W 50–19; L 24–38	Aaron Best (4–3)
2020–21	First Round	North Dakota State	L 20–42	Aaron Best (4–3)
2021	First Round; Second Round	Northern Iowa @ Montana	W 19–9; L 41–57	Aaron Best (4–3)

== Head coaches ==
Coach	Years	Seasons	Record	Pct.	Conf. champs	Playoff appearances	National titles
Unknown	1901–1902	2	3–3–2	.500	0	0	0
Claude Arthur	1903	1	3–2–2	.571	0	0	0
Henry E. Smith	1904–1905	2	5–9	.357	0	0	0
Paul Lienau	1906–1907	2	8–5	.615	0	0	0
Nick E. Hinch	1908, 1912	2	2–4	.333	0	0	0
Harry Goldsworthy	1909	1	0–2	.000	0	0	0
Albert Fertsch	1913–1916	4	4–9	.308	0	0	0
Vin Eustis	1920–1926	7	24–25–1	.490	3 (1921, 1923, 1925)	0	0
Arthur C. Woodward	1927–1928	2	7–8	.467	0	0	0
Brick Johnson	1929	1	4-4	.500	0	0	0
Red Reese	1930–1941, 1946	13	66–26–9	.698	5 (1934–1937, 1939)	0	0
Ralph Peterson	1942	1	3–4	.429	0	0	0
Abe Poffenroth	1947–1952	6	32–19–1	.625	4 (1947–1950)	0	0
Ed Chissus	1953–1962	10	29–52–4	.365	0	0	0
Dave Holmes	1963–1967	5	34–13–1	.719	3 (1965–1967)	1 (1967)	0
Brent Wooten	1968–1970	3	11–18	.379	1 (1969)	0	0
John Massengale	1971–1978	8	35–39–1	.473	0	0	0
Dick Zornes	1979–1993	15	89–66–2	.573	1 (1992)	2 (1985, 1992)	0
Mike Kramer	1994–1999	6	37–32	.536	1 (1997)	1 (1997)	0
Paul Wulff	2000–2007	8	53–40	.570	2 (2004, 2005)	3 (2004, 2005, 2007)	0
Beau Baldwin	2008–2016	9	85–32	.726	5 (2010, 2012–2014, 2016)	6 (2009, 2010, 2012–2014, 2016)	1 (2010)
Aaron Best	2017–present	9	57–47	.548	1 (2018)	3 (2018, 2020–21, 2021)	0

Note: Eastern Washington did not field teams from 1910 to 1911, 1917 to 1919, and 1943 to 1945.

== Home stadium ==
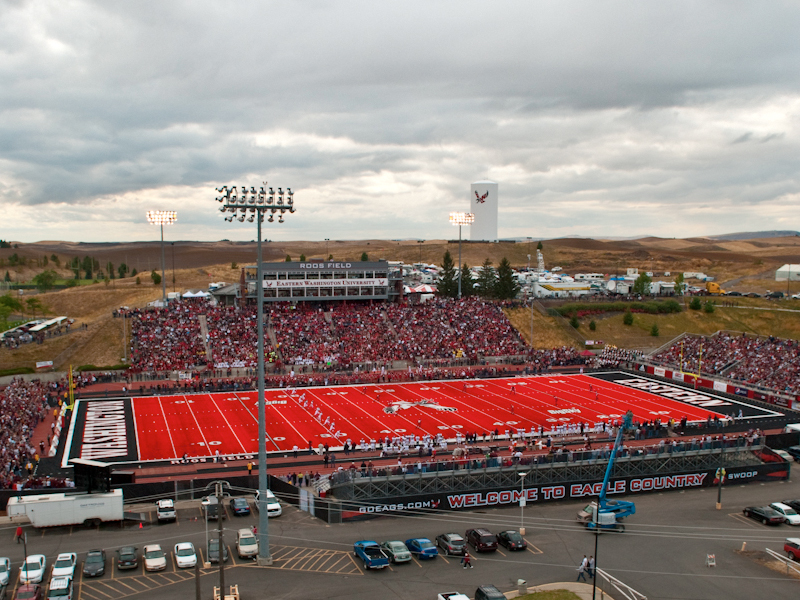
Roos Field with red turf installed in 2010

The EWU football team plays at Roos Field, opened in 1967 and recently expanded and renovated in 2004 and 2010 to seat 11,702. The stadium was originally named Woodward Field in honor of former Eagles head football and basketball coach Arthur C. Woodward. It replaced the original Woodward Field, which was located near the present JFK Library.

=== Red turf installation and name change ===
On February 26, 2010, ESPN reported that Eastern Washington planned to remove the natural grass surface at Woodward Field and replace it with red SprinTurf, the first of its kind, at any level of American football. A funding drive was initiated in late January 2010, with EWU alumnus Michael Roos donating $500,000 toward the installation costs, and fellow alumnus and ESPN personality Colin Cowherd also making a donation.

On May 20, 2010, the Eastern Washington Board of Trustees approved a name change to Roos Field, scheduled for the 2010 season, upon the successful completion of the project. Installation of the red synthetic turf was completed in September 2010, in time for the first home game of the 2010 season against Montana.

=== The Inferno ===
Eastern Washington's red playing surface is known as The Inferno. The nickname was chosen through a vote conducted by Eastern on its athletic website, goeags.com. Voting began on August 4, 2010, and allowed fans to choose from seven proposed names: red sea, red zone, inferno, big red, red carpet, ring of fire and lava pit. Inferno finished as the top choice and the nickname was revealed at the first home game with the new field on September 18, 2010.

== Rivalries ==
=== Montana ===
The EWU–UM Governors Cup is the game against conference rival Montana, usually played in mid-season in October, alternating between Roos Field in Cheney and Washington–Grizzly Stadium in Missoula. The Eagles currently trail in the overall series with 18 wins, 30 losses, and a tie; it became the Governors Cup in 1998 for the 25th meeting and Montana also leads that series at 13–8 (.619), through 2017. The Cup was originally contested between EWU and the University of Idaho, from 1984 through 1997.

=== Portland State ===
The Eagles also have a new rivalry with the Portland State Vikings in all sports, starting in 2010 called The Dam Cup. Eastern football won the first rivalry match between the two schools in 2010 with a score of 55–17. The purpose of the Dam Cup is to create a rivalry between Portland State University and Eastern Washington University and provide a sense of pride between alumni in the Portland and Spokane areas. Other goals include increasing attendance at events between both schools and building school spirit among each institutions' student body.

Team	Rivalry name	Trophy	Games played	First meeting	Last meeting	EWU win	EWU loss	Ties	Win %
Montana Grizzlies	EWU–UM Governors Cup	Governors Cup	49	1938†	2022, Lost 7–63	18	30	1	.378
Portland State Vikings	The Dam Cup	Dam Cup	44	1986‡	2022, Lost 35-38	22	21	1	.511

† The Governors Cup rivalry with Montana was officially established in 1998, but both teams have played against each other since the date listed above.
‡ The Dam Cup rivalry with Portland State was officially established in 2010, but both teams have played against each other since the date listed above.

== Individual award winners ==
The following Eastern Washington players have been recipients of the noted conference and national award honors.

=== National award winners – players ===
- Buck Buchanan Award

National Defensive Player of the Year
2008: Greg Peach
2010: J. C. Sherritt

- Jerry Rice Award

National Freshman Player of the Year
2013: Cooper Kupp

- Touchdown Club of Columbus FCS Player of the Year

Touchdown Club of Columbus FCS Player of the Year
Year	Name	Position
2016	Gage Gubrud	QB

- Walter Payton Award

National Offensive Player of the Year
2005: Erik Meyer
2011: Bo Levi Mitchell
2015: Cooper Kupp
2021: Eric Barriere

- Fred Mitchell Award

National Placekicker of the Year from the NCAA Division I FCS, Division II, Division III, NAIA, and NJCAA levels
2018: Roldan Alcobendas

- National Football Foundation National Scholar-Athlete Award

NFF National Scholar-Athlete Award
Year	Name	Position
2019	Spencer Blackburn	C

=== Big Sky Conference honors ===
- Offensive Player of the Year

1997: Harry Leons, QB
2001: Jesse Chatman, RB
2002: Josh Blankenship, QB
2004: Erik Meyer, QB
2005: Erik Meyer, QB
2007: Matt Nichols, QB
2009: Matt Nichols, QB
2010: Taiwan Jones, RB
2011: Bo Levi Mitchell, QB
2013: Vernon Adams, QB
2014: Vernon Adams, QB
2015: Cooper Kupp, WR
2016: Cooper Kupp, WR (Co-POY)
2016: Gage Gubrud, QB (Co-POY)
2020-21: Eric Barriere, QB
2021: Eric Barriere, QB

- Defensive Player of the Year

1993: Jason Marsh, LB
1997: Chris Scott, DT
2005: Joey Cwik, LB
2008: Greg Peach, DE
2010: J. C. Sherritt, LB
2018: Jay-Tee Tiuli, DT

- Special Teams Player of the Year

2013: Bo Schuetzle, CB

- Freshman of the Year

2013: Cooper Kupp, WR

- Newcomer of the Year

1990: Harold Wright, RB
2002: Josh Blankenship, QB
2004: Rocky Hanni, OG

- Coach of the Year

1992: Dick Zornes
1997: Mike Kramer
2001: Paul Wulff
2004: Paul Wulff
2005: Paul Wulff
2012: Beau Baldwin
2013: Beau Baldwin
2018: Aaron Best

== Eagles in the pros ==
The following former Eastern Washington players are currently playing in one of the two professional football leagues listed below.

- National Football League

Player	Position	Team
Kendrick Bourne	WR	Arizona Cardinals
Efton Chism	WR	New England Patriots
Samson Ebukam	LB	Indianapolis Colts
Cooper Kupp	WR	Seattle Seahawks

- Canadian Football League

Player	Position	Team
Mitch Fettig	S	Calgary Stampeders
Victor Gamboa	CB	BC Lions
T. J. Lee	CB	BC Lions
Vernon Adams	QB	BC Lions
Josh Lewis	CB	Hamilton Tiger-Cats
Bo Levi Mitchell	QB	Hamilton Tiger-Cats
Matt Nichols	QB	Toronto Argonauts

== Retired numbers ==
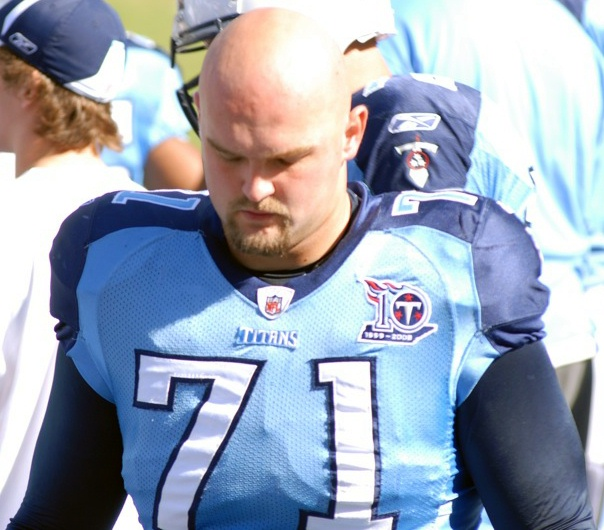
Michael Roos, whose No. 71 was retired by the program

Eastern Washington Eagles retired numbers
No.	Player	Pos.	Tenure	Year retired	Ref.
71	Michael Roos	OT	2001–2004	2009	
84	Bob Picard	WR	1968–1969, 1971–1972	2003	

== Future non-conference opponents ==
Scheduled opponents as of June 19, 2025.

2026	2027	2028	2029	2030
Northern Iowa	at Oregon	at Washington		at Washington State
at South Dakota	South Dakota			
at Washington	Incarnate Word			
