= Eastern Washington Eagles =

Intercollegiate sports teams of Eastern Washington University

- University: Eastern Washington University
- Nickname: Eagles
- NCAA: Division I (FCS)
- Conference: Big Sky
- Athletic director: Tim Collins
- Location: Cheney, Washington
- Varsity teams: 12
- Football stadium: Roos Field
- Basketball arena: Reese Court
- Colors: Red and white
- Mascot: Swoop
- Fight song: Go, Eagles, Go
- Website: goeags.com

The Eastern Washington Eagles are the intercollegiate varsity athletic teams that represent Eastern Washington University, located in Cheney, southwest of Spokane. A member of the Big Sky Conference, EWU's athletic program comprises five men's sports: basketball, cross country, football, tennis, and track and field, and seven women's sports: basketball, cross country, golf, soccer, tennis, track and field, and volleyball.

== Varsity athletics ==
Men's sports	Women's sports
Basketball	Basketball
Cross Country	Cross Country
Football	Golf
Tennis	Soccer
Track and field^{†}	Tennis
	Track and field^{†}
	Volleyball
† – Track and field includes both indoor and outdoor

Big Sky logo in Black And Red colors

Eastern has been a member of NCAA Division I since the summer of 1983, moving up from Division II. For most of its history, Eastern was a member of the NAIA (National Association of Intercollegiate Athletics) before upgrading its programs and joining the NCAA in the late 1970s. EWU has been a member of the Big Sky athletic conference since 1987; the school's mascot is Swoop and the school colors are red and white.

In 2010, EWU won the NCAA Division I FCS national championship, EWU's first at the Division I level for any sport.

In 1973, the student body voted to make Eastern's mascot the Eagles. Shortly before that, the board of trustees declared "Savages", its mascot through its first 92 years, no longer acceptable.

=== Football ===
Eastern football is currently coached by Aaron Best and competes at the Football Championship Subdivision (FCS) level of Division I. Eastern claimed its first national championship in 2010, defeating Delaware 20–19 in the title game.

=== Men's basketball ===
Eastern men's basketball is currently coached by David Riley. Eastern has claimed two Big Sky regular season championships and two Big Sky conference tournament championships. Eastern advanced to the 2004 NCAA tournament and the 2015 NCAA tournament. Eastern lost to Oklahoma State in the first round in 2004 and Georgetown in the opening round in 2015.

=== Former sports ===
Eastern formerly had varsity programs in baseball, wrestling, and gymnastics (men's & women's).

Baseball joined the Northern Pacific Conference in 1980 as its eighth team, but after the next season, half of those programs had disbanded, and Oregon dropped the sport as well. The NorPac merged into the northern division of the Pac-10 for the 1982 baseball season, bringing the total up to seven schools.

Baseball and wrestling were discontinued 36 years ago, following the 1990 seasons. The EWU wrestling team won NAIA tournament in 1977 scoring 95.5 points. Lanny Davidson is one of only 18 wrestlers in the history of the tournament to win three national NAIA wrestling championships.

== National championships ==
The Eagles have won two team NCAA national championships.

=== Team ===
Sport	Association	Division	Year	Opponent/Runner-up	Score
Men's cross country (1)	NCAA	Division II	1982	South Dakota State	84–123 (-39)
Football (1)	NCAA	Division I FCS	2010	Delaware	20–19

== Facilities ==
=== Roos Field ===
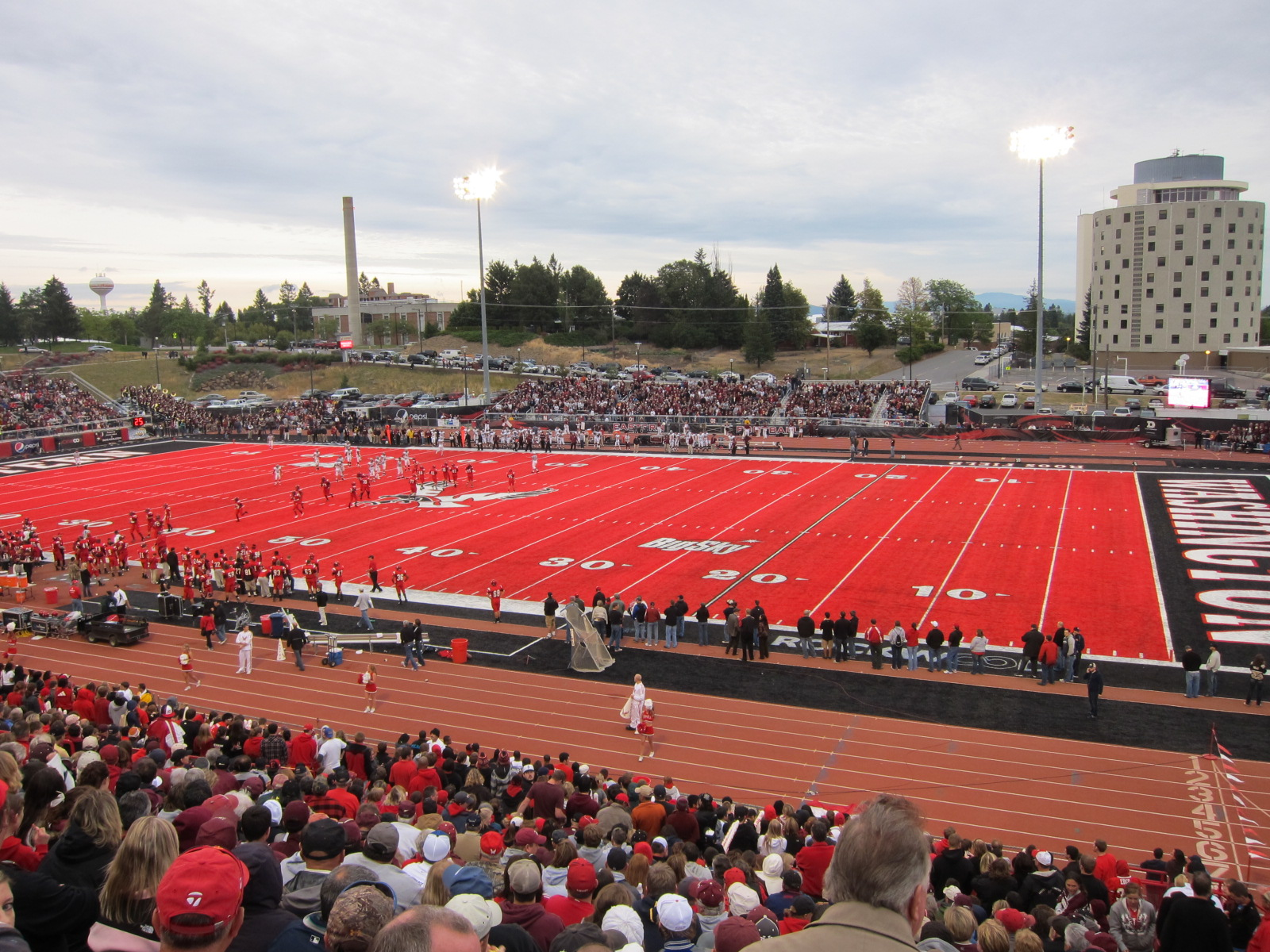
Roos Field in 2010, with new red turf

The EWU football team plays at Roos Field, opened in 1967; expanded and renovated in 2004 and 2010 to increase capacity to 11,702. The stadium was originally named 'Woodward Field' in honor of former Eagles head football and basketball coach Arthur C. Woodward. It replaced the original Woodward Field, which was located near the present JFK Library. The introduction of red artificial turf and name change to Roos Field occurred in 2010.

=== Reese Court ===
Reese Court is a 6,000-seat multi-purpose arena that is home to the Eastern Washington University women's volleyball and men's and women's basketball teams. It replaced the Eastern Washington Fieldhouse when it opened in 1975. It was named for William B. "Red" Reese (1899–1974), the athletic director and head coach in multiple sports.

== Rivalries ==
=== Montana Grizzlies ===
The EWU–UM Governors Cup is the annual college football game between the Montana Grizzlies and the Eastern Eagles. Traditionally, it is in the middle of the regular season, played on the Saturday alternating between Roos Field and Washington–Grizzly Stadium each year. The Eagles currently trail in the series with 11 wins and 25 losses.

== Mascot ==
In 1973, the student body voted to make Eastern's mascot the Eagles. Shortly before that, the Eastern Board of Trustees declared "Savages", its mascot through its first 92 years, no longer acceptable. Eagles are native to eastern Washington and thus a logical choice for a replacement.
