= Tri-Normal Conference =

Defunct college athletic conference

The Tri-Normal Conference (also known as the Tri-Normal League) was an intercollegiate athletic conference composed of member schools located in the state of Washington that operated from 1922 to 1938. The conference's three members were Washington State Normal School in Ellensburg (now known as Central Washington University), the State Normal School at Cheney (now known as Eastern Washington University), and Western Washington College of Education in Bellingham (now known as Western Washington University). When the conference disbanded in 1938, the three members joined Pacific Lutheran College—now known as Pacific Lutheran University—to form the Washington Intercollegiate Conference (WINCO).

== Football champions ==
- 1922: Unknown
- 1923: Bellingham Normal
- 1924: Bellingham Normal
- 1925: Cheney Normal
- 1926: Ellensburg Normal
- 1927: Ellensburg Normal
- 1928: Ellensburg Normal
- 1929: Ellensburg Normal
- 1930: Ellensburg Normal
- 1931: Ellensburg Normal
- 1932: Cheney Normal & Ellensburg Normal
- 1933: Ellensburg Normal
- 1934: Cheney Normal
- 1935: Cheney Normal
- 1936: Cheney Normal
- 1937: Eastern Washington

== Yearly football standings ==
1923 Tri-Normal Conference football standings
	Conf.					Overall
Team	W		L		T	W		L		T
Bellingham Normal $	2	–	0	–	0	3	–	0	–	2
Cheney Normal	1	–	1	–	0	5	–	2	–	0
Ellensburg Normal	0	–	2	–	0	0	–	3	–	0
$ – Conference champion

1924 Tri-Normal Conference football standings
	Conf.					Overall
Team	W		L		T	W		L		T
Bellingham Normal $	2	–	0	–	0	4	–	2	–	0
Cheney Normal	1	–	1	–	0	3	–	4	–	1
Ellensburg Normal	0	–	2	–	0	1	–	4	–	0
$ – Conference champion

1925 Tri-Normal Conference football standings
	Conf.					Overall
Team	W		L		T	W		L		T
Cheney Normal $	2	–	0	–	0	6	–	3	–	0
Bellingham Normal	1	–	1	–	0	5	–	2	–	0
Ellensburg Normal	0	–	2	–	0	2	–	4	–	0
$ – Conference champion

1934 Tri-Normal Conference football standings
	Conf.					Overall
Team	W		L		T	W		L		T
Cheney Normal $	2	–	0	–	0	6	–	1	–	0
Bellingham Normal	0	–	1	–	1	2	–	2	–	3
Ellensburg Normal	0	–	1	–	1	3	–	3	–	2
$ – Conference champion

1937 Tri-Normal Conference football standings
	Conf.					Overall
Team	W		L		T	W		L		T
Eastern Washington $	2	–	0	–	0	6	–	1	–	0
Western Washington	1	–	1	–	0	4	–	2	–	1
Central Washington	0	–	2	–	0	3	–	4	–	0
$ – Conference champion
