= Western Washington Vikings football =

Western Washington Vikings
- First season: 1903
- Last season: 2008
- Location: Bellingham, Washington
- Stadium: Civic Stadium (capacity: 4,000)
- Conference: Great Northwest Athletic Conference
- Colors: Navy blue, white, slate blue, and silver
- Rivalries: Central Washington Wildcats
- Website: WWUVikings.com

The Western Washington Vikings program represented Western Washington University in college football at the NCAA Division II level. The Vikings were members of the Great Northwest Athletic Conference until the program was eliminated in January 2009 due to budget cuts. Western Washington first fielded a football team in 1903; the team played 797 total games in 98 seasons with a final record of 383 wins, 380 losses, and 34 ties. The Vikings had five national Division II playoff appearances and finished as runners-up in the 1996 NAIA Division II season.

== History ==
=== Conference affiliations ===
- 1903–1921: Independent
- 1922–1937: Tri-Normal Conference
- 1938–1947: Washington Intercollegiate Conference
- 1948–1984: Evergreen Conference
- 1985–1987: Columbia Football League
- 1988–2000: Columbia Football Association
- 2001–2005: Great Northwest Athletic Conference
- 2006–2007: North Central Intercollegiate Athletic Conference
- 2008–2008: Great Northwest Athletic Conference

== Postseason appearances ==
=== NCAA Division II ===
The Vikings have made one appearance in the NCAA Division II playoffs, with an overall record of 0–1.

| Year | Round | Opponent | Result |
|---|---|---|---|
| 1999 | First Round | Northeastern State (OK) | L, 24–27 ^{OT} |

=== NAIA Division II ===
The Vikings have made four appearances in the NAIA Division II playoffs, with an overall record of 4–4.

| Year | Round | Opponent | Result |
|---|---|---|---|
| 1992 | First Round | Linfield | L, 0–26 |
| 1994 | First Round; Quarterfinals | Linfield; Pacific Lutheran | W, 21–2; L, 20–25 |
| 1995 | First Round | Central Washington | L, 21–28 |
| 1996 | First Round; Quarterfinals; Semifinals; National Championship | Pacific Lutheran; Willamette; Findlay; Sioux Falls | W, 21–20 ^{OT} W, 13–12; W, 28–21; L, 25–47 |
