= Spokane University =

Defunct liberal-arts college in Spokane, Washington, United States (1913–1933)

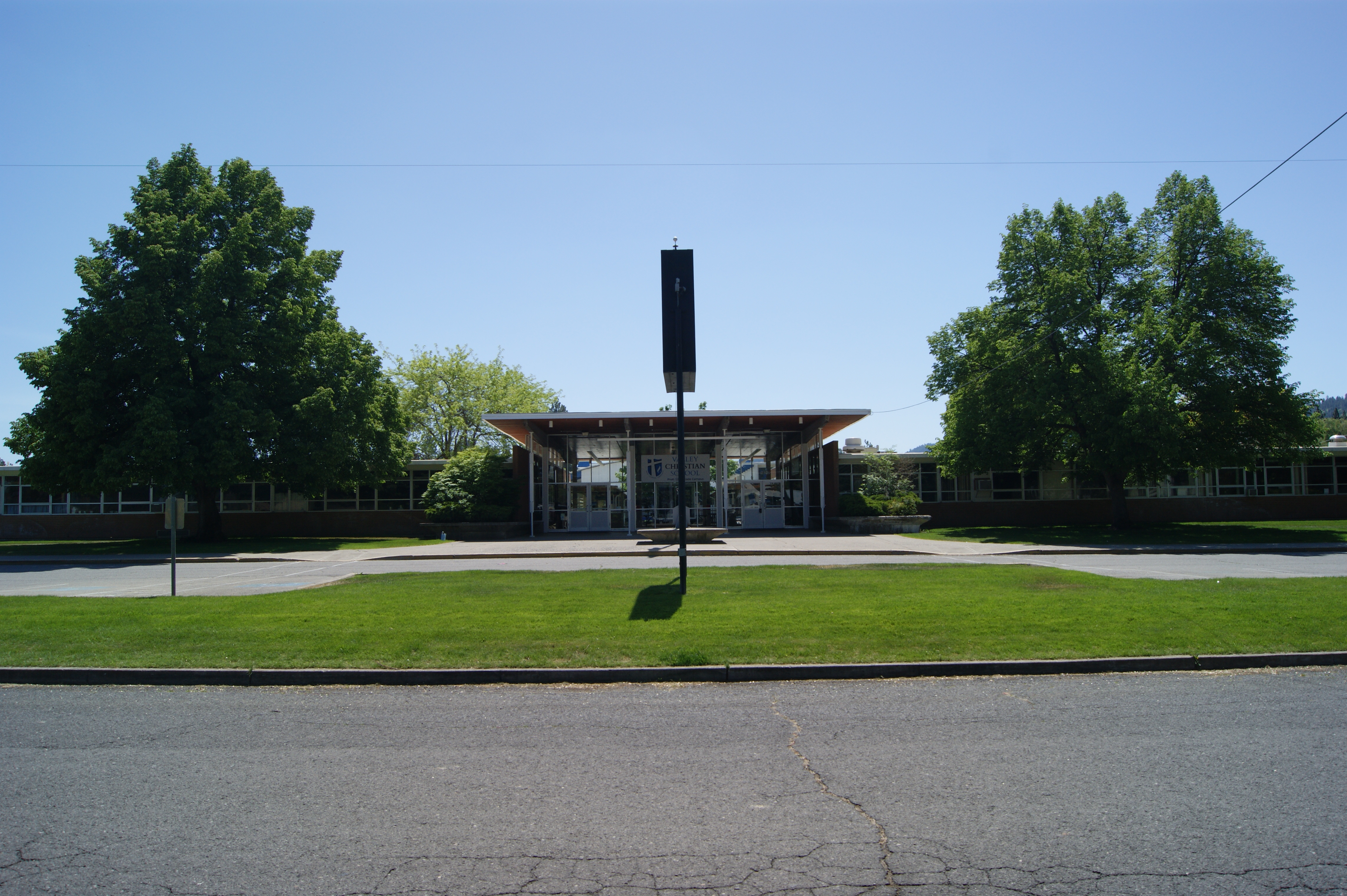
A private high school now occupies the former site of Spokane University

Spokane University was a four-year liberal arts college that operated from 1913 to 1933. It was founded in 1912 by Mr. B. E. Utz and Mr. W. D. Willoughby as Spokane Bible College. Mr. Utz worked at Eugene Bible University in Eugene, Oregon from 1909 to 1911 before moving back to Spokane. Spokane University was created to train ministers for the Christian Churches in Washington State. Because of financial difficulties during the Great Depression, in 1934 it merged with Eugene Bible College to become Northwest Christian College in Eugene, Oregon, now known as Bushnell University.

During its existence, Spokane University conferred degrees on 112 men and 100 women. Forty-six of the men were ordained. It was organized as three colleges: Bible, Liberal Arts, and Fine Arts.

Spokane University's sports teams were known as the Crusaders. The school's colors were purple and white. The school was a member of the Columbia Valley Conference.

The facilities were sold to Spokane Junior College which moved into the city of Spokane from its original location in the Spokane Valley to the former site of Spokane College on Spokane's South Hill. The former site of the university, twenty-three acres at Ninth and Herald Streets, was the home of University High School from 1963 to 2002. The former site of Spokane University is now owned and occupied by Valley Christian School, as University High School has moved to a new location on 32nd Avenue.

== Presidents ==
- B. E. Utz, 1912–1914
- Isaac N. McCash, 1914–1916
- Andrew M. Meldrum, 1916–1922
- Chester V. Dunn, 1922–1924
- Roy K. Roadruck, 1924–1932
- A. G. Sater, 1932–1933

== Notable alumni ==
- Clyfford Still, class of 1933, American painter, one of the leading figures in abstract expressionism
- Don Magnuson, attended 1926 to 1928, five-term U.S. representative from Washington
- George B. Thomas, professor of mathematics at MIT and author of a classic calculus textbook
