= Columbia Valley Conference =

Defunct college athletic conference

The Columbia Valley Conference (also known as the Columbia Valley Intercollegiate Conference) was an intercollegiate athletic conference composed of member schools located in the states of Idaho, Oregon, and Washington that operated from 1920 to 1929. Originally called the Spokane Intercollegiate Conference, the conference was founded in 1920 with four charter members: Eastern Washington College of Education (now known as Eastern Washington University), Spokane College, Spokane University, and Whitworth College (now known as Whitworth University. The conference changed its name to Columbia Valley Intercollegiate Conference in October 1923. In December 1923, the conference admitted two new members: Columbia College of Milton, Oregon, and Lewiston State Normal School—now known as Lewis–Clark State College.

== Football champions ==
- 1920: Spokane University
- 1921: Cheney Normal
- 1922: Whitworth
- 1923: Cheney Normal
- 1924: Cheney Normal and Spokane College
- 1925: Cheney Normal
- 1926: Spokane University
- 1927: Spokane University

== Yearly football standings ==
1920 Spokane Intercollegiate Conference football standings
| | Conf. | | | | | Overall |
| Team | W | | L | | T | W | | L | | T |
|---|---|---|---|---|---|---|---|---|---|---|
| Spokane University $ | 6 | – | 1 | – | 0 | ? | – | ? | – | ? |
| Cheney Normal | 5 | – | 2 | – | 0 | 5 | – | 2 | – | 0 |
| Spokane College | 2 | – | 4 | – | 0 | ? | – | ? | – | ? |
| Whitworth | 0 | – | 6 | – | 0 | ? | – | ? | – | ? |
$ – Conference champion

1923 Spokane Intercollegiate Conference football standings
| | Conf. | | | | | Overall |
| Team | W | | L | | T | W | | L | | T |
|---|---|---|---|---|---|---|---|---|---|---|
| Cheney Normal $ | 3 | – | 0 | – | 0 | 5 | – | 2 | – | 0 |
| Spokane College | 2 | – | 1 | – | 0 | ? | – | ? | – | ? |
| Whitworth | 1 | – | 2 | – | 0 | ? | – | ? | – | ? |
| Spokane University | 0 | – | 3 | – | 0 | ? | – | ? | – | ? |
$ – Conference champion

1921 Spokane Intercollegiate Conference football standings
| | Conf. | | | | | Overall |
| Team | W | | L | | T | W | | L | | T |
|---|---|---|---|---|---|---|---|---|---|---|
| Cheney Normal $ | 3 | – | 0 | – | 0 | 3 | – | 3 | – | 0 |
| Whitworth | 4 | – | 1 | – | 0 | 5 | – | 1 | – | 0 |
| Spokane College | 1 | – | 3 | – | 1 | ? | – | ? | – | ? |
| Spokane University | 0 | – | 4 | – | 1 | ? | – | ? | – | ? |
$ – Conference champion

1924 Columbia Valley Conference football standings
| | Conf. | | | | | Overall |
| Team | W | | L | | T | W | | L | | T |
|---|---|---|---|---|---|---|---|---|---|---|
| Cheney Normal + | 2 | – | 0 | – | 1 | 3 | – | 4 | – | 1 |
| Spokane College + | 2 | – | 0 | – | 1 | ? | – | ? | – | ? |
| Whitworth | 1 | – | 2 | – | 0 | ? | – | ? | – | ? |
| Lewiston Normal | 0 | – | 3 | – | 0 | ? | – | ? | – | ? |
+ – Conference co-champions

1922 Spokane Intercollegiate Conference football standings
| | Conf. | | | | | Overall |
| Team | W | | L | | T | W | | L | | T |
|---|---|---|---|---|---|---|---|---|---|---|
| Whitworth $ | 5 | – | 0 | – | 0 | ? | – | ? | – | ? |
| Spokane College | 3 | – | 2 | – | 0 | ? | – | ? | – | ? |
| Cheney Normal | 1 | – | 2 | – | 0 | 1 | – | 5 | – | 0 |
| Spokane University | 0 | – | 5 | – | 0 | ? | – | ? | – | ? |
$ – Conference champion

1925 Columbia Valley Conference football standings
| | Conf. | | | | | Overall |
| Team | W | | L | | T | W | | L | | T |
|---|---|---|---|---|---|---|---|---|---|---|
| Cheney Normal $ | 3 | – | 0 | – | 0 | 6 | – | 3 | – | 0 |
| Spokane College | 2 | – | 1 | – | 0 | ? | – | ? | – | ? |
| Whitworth | 1 | – | 2 | – | 0 | ? | – | ? | – | ? |
| Spokane University | 0 | – | 3 | – | 0 | ? | – | ? | – | ? |
$ – Conference champion
