= Spokane College =

Private college in Medford and Spokane, Washington, U.S.

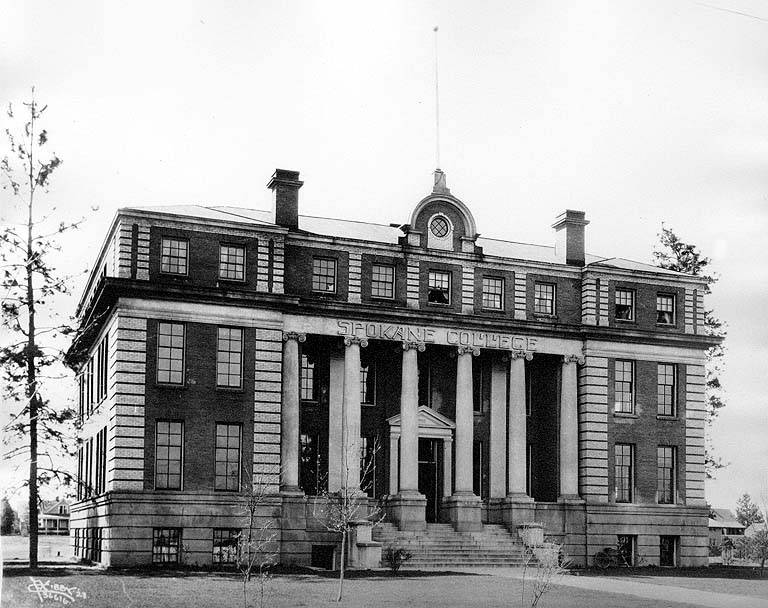
- Spokane College, c. 1928
- Type: Private college
- Active: 1906–1929
- Affiliations: United Norwegian Lutheran Church of America
- Location: Spokane, Washington, United States; 47.627705°N 117.399327°W

Spokane College was the name of two colleges in Spokane, Washington. The first operated from 1882 to 1891, and the second operated from 1906 to 1929.

The first Spokane College operated from October 1882 to October 1891 on 157 acres just north of the Spokane River. It was founded by Colonel David Jenkins, a Civil War veteran, who later founded Jenkins College in December 1891. When it opened, tuition at Spokane College was $15. Enrollment peaked at 200 students in 1890, but Spokane College couldn't compete with other nearby institutions: Gonzaga University, the Washington Agricultural College and School of Science (now Washington State University), and the State Normal School (now Eastern Washington University).

The second Spokane College was founded in 1906 by the United Norwegian Lutheran Church of America on Spokane's South Hill, and operated until 1929. The four-year liberal arts college also operated a law school. The college closed in 1929 when it was merged into Pacific Lutheran College (now Pacific Lutheran University). Spokane College's sports teams were known as the Chieftains. The school was a member of the Columbia Valley Conference.

Spokane Junior College operated on the site from 1935 to 1942. Spokane Junior College was a reorganization of Spokane University, which operated in the Spokane Valley from 1913 to 1933. The junior college closed in 1942 when it merged with Whitworth College (now Whitworth University).

During World War II, the building was used as housing for soldiers stationed at Fort George Wright. The building was turned into apartments after the war, and was torn down in 1969 to make way for the Manito Shopping Center, which presently occupies the site.
