= 2024–25 Summit League women's basketball season =

- League: NCAA Division I
- Sport: Basketball
- Teams: 9
- TV partner(s): Summit League Network, CBS Sports Network

Regular season
- Regular season champion: South Dakota State
- Season MVP: Grace Larkins, South Dakota

Summit League tournament
- Champions: South Dakota State
- Runners-up: Oral Roberts
- Tournament MVP: Paige Meyer, South Dakota State

Summit League women's basketball seasons
- ← 2023–24 2025–26 →

2024–25 Summit League women's basketball standings
	Conf.				Overall
Team	W		L	PCT	W		L	PCT
No. 24 South Dakota State †	16	–	0	1.000	30	–	4	.882
Oral Roberts	12	–	4	.750	24	–	9	.727
North Dakota State	11	–	5	.688	21	–	12	.636
St. Thomas*	9	–	7	.563	16	–	14	.533
North Dakota	6	–	10	.375	12	–	19	.387
Kansas City	6	–	10	.375	12	–	21	.364
South Dakota	5	–	11	.313	11	–	20	.355
Omaha	5	–	11	.313	14	–	17	.452
Denver	2	–	14	.125	9	–	21	.300
† 2025 Summit League tournament winner * Ineligible for the 2025 NCAA tournament due to transition from Division III; Rankings from AP poll

The 2024–25 Summit League women's basketball season began non-conference play on November 4, 2024. Conference play began on January 2, 2025 and ended on March 1, 2025. This was the eighteenth season of women's basketball play under the Summit League name and forty-third overall for the conference.
The Summit League tournament took place from March 5–9, 2025. South Dakota State won the tournament, defeating Oral Roberts in the tournament final, and advanced to the NCAA tournament. Oral Roberts played in the 2025 Women's Basketball Invitation Tournament (WBIT). North Dakota State played in the 2025 Women's National Invitation Tournament (WNIT).

== Preseason ==
The preseason Summit League women's basketball poll was released on October 8, 2024.

=== Preseason poll ===
First place votes in parentheses

1. South Dakota State (34) – 562
2. Oral Roberts (1) – 479
3. North Dakota State (1) – 427
4. South Dakota – 363
5. St. Thomas – 336
6. Denver – 220
7. North Dakota – 188
8. Kansas City – 144
9. Omaha – 116

=== Preseason awards ===
Honor	Recipient
Preseason Player of the Year	Brooklyn Meyer, South Dakota State
Preseason All-Summit League First Team	Jordan Jones, Denver
Preseason All-Summit League First Team	Taleyah Jones, Oral Roberts
Preseason All-Summit League First Team	Grace Larkins, South Dakota
Preseason All-Summit League First Team	Brooklyn Meyer, South Dakota State
Preseason All-Summit League First Team	Paige Meyer, South Dakota State
Preseason All-Summit League First Team	Ruthie Udoumoh, Oral Roberts
Preseason All-Summit League Second Team	Grace Cave, Omaha
Preseason All-Summit League Second Team	Jade Hill, St. Thomas
Preseason All-Summit League Second Team	Jalei Oglesby, Oral Roberts
Preseason All-Summit League Second Team	Amber Scalia, St. Thomas
Preseason All-Summit League Second Team	Haleigh Timmer, South Dakota State

== Regular season ==
=== Records against other conferences ===
2024–25 records against non-conference foes as of December 30, 2024:

Major 6 Conferences	Record	Major 6 Conferences	Record
ACC	0–2	American	2–4
Big East	1–1	Big Ten	2–5
Big 12	0–5	SEC	2–3
Major 6 Total			7–20
Other Division I Conferences	Record	Other Division I Conferences	Record
Atlantic 10	1–1	ASUN	1–0
America East	1–0	Big Sky	11–9
Big South	0–2	Big West	2–0
CAA	1–0	Conference USA	0–1
Horizon League	2–1	Ivy League	None
Independents	None	MAAC	0–1
MAC	3–0	MEAC	1–0
MVC	2–5	MWC	3–3
NEC	None	OVC	5–3
Patriot League	None	SoCon	None
Southland	1–2	SWAC	0–1
Sun Belt	0–2	WAC	1–1
WCC	1–2		
Other Division I Total			36–34
NCAA Division I Total			43–54
NCAA Division II Total			5–1
NCAA Division III Total			5–0
NAIA Total			12–0
NCCAA Total			0–0
Total Non-Conference Record			65–53

=== Record against ranked non-conference opponents ===
This will be a list of games against ranked opponents only (rankings from the AP Poll):
Summit League teams in bold

Date	Visitor	Home	Site	Score	Conference record	Ref
November 4, 2024	**Omaha**	No. 23 Nebraska	Pinnacle Bank Arena ● Lincoln, NE	**L 48**–88	0–1	
November 8, 2024	No. 21 Creighton	**South Dakota State**	First Bank and Trust Arena ● Brookings, SD	**W 76**–71	1–1	
November 14, 2024	**St. Thomas**	No. 8 Iowa State	Hilton Coliseum ● Ames, IA	**L 47**–80	1–2	
November 16, 2024	No. 21 Nebraska	**South Dakota**†	Sanford Pentagon ● Sioux Falls, SD	**L 70**–113	1–3	
November 17, 2024	No. 16 Duke	**South Dakota State**	First Bank and Trust Arena ● Brookings, SD	**L 71**–75	1–4	
November 26, 2024	No. 21 Oregon	**South Dakota State**†	George Q. Cannon Activities Center ● Laie, HI	**W 75**–70	2–4	
November 26, 2024	**Kansas City**	No. 25 Nebraska	Pinnacle Bank Arena ● Lincoln, NE	**L 38**–84	2–5	
December 15, 2024	**Oral Roberts**	No. 10 Oklahoma	Lloyd Noble Center ● Norman, OK	**L 54**–94	2–6	
December 22, 2024	**South Dakota State**	No. 6 Texas	Moody Center ● Austin, TX	**L 57**–103	2–7	
December 22, 2024	**Omaha**	No. 10 Oklahoma	Lloyd Noble Center ● Norman, OK	**L 65**–111	2–8	
March 22, 2025	No. 24 **South Dakota State**	No. 17 Oklahoma State†^	Harry A. Gampel Pavilion ● Storrs, CT	**W 74**–68	3–8	
March 25, 2025	No. 24 **South Dakota State**	No. 3 UConn^	Harry A. Gampel Pavilion ● Storrs, CT	**L 57**–91	3–9	

Team rankings are reflective of AP poll

† denotes game was played at neutral site
^ denotes NCAA tournament game

=== Conference matrix ===
	Denver	Kansas City	North Dakota	North Dakota State	Omaha	Oral Roberts	St. Thomas	South Dakota	South Dakota State
vs. Denver	–	2–0	2–0	2–0	1–1	2–0	2–0	1–1	2–0
vs. Kansas City	0–2	–	2–0	1–1	1–1	2–0	1–1	1–1	2–0
vs. North Dakota	0–2	0–2	–	1–1	2–0	2–0	2–0	1–1	2–0
vs. North Dakota State	0–2	1–1	1–1	–	0–2	1–1	0–2	0–2	2–0
vs. Omaha	1–1	1–1	0–2	2–0	–	2–0	2–0	1–1	2–0
vs. Oral Roberts	0–2	0–2	0–2	1–1	0–2	–	1–1	0–2	2–0
vs. St. Thomas	0–2	1–1	0–2	2–0	0–2	1–1	–	1–1	2–0
vs. South Dakota	1–1	1–1	1–1	2–0	1–1	2–0	1–1	–	2–0
vs. South Dakota State	0–2	0–2	0–2	0–2	0–2	0–2	0–2	0–2	–
Total	2–14	6–10	6–10	11–5	5–11	12–4	9–7	5–11	16–0

Through March 1, 2025

=== Points scored ===
Team	For	Against	Difference
Denver	1914	2024	–110
Kansas City	2165	2317	–152
North Dakota	2056	2173	–117
North Dakota State	2087	1942	+145
Omaha	2099	2279	–180
Oral Roberts	2661	2329	+332
St. Thomas	2140	2075	+65
South Dakota	2041	2239	–198
South Dakota State	2443	1964	+479

Through March 17, 2025

=== National Television Games ===
Any games that league members will play on National Television, including the Summit League's media contract with CBS Sports Network, are listed here.

Summit League members in bold

Date Time (CT)	Road Team	Home team	Final Score	Network
November 17, 2024; 2:30 PM	Duke	**South Dakota State**	**L 71**–75	CBSSN
February 8, 2025; 11 AM	**Oral Roberts**	**South Dakota State**	71–89	CBSSN

=== Home attendance ===
Team	Arena	Capacity	Total Games	Average Attendance	Attendance High	Total Attendance	% of Capacity
Denver	Hamilton Gymnasium	2,500	16	393	947; Dec 7 vs. Portland St	6,303	15.8%
Kansas City	Swinney Recreation Center	1,500	11	409	998; Nov 22 vs. Lindenwood	4,505	27.3%
North Dakota	Betty Engelstad Sioux Center	3,300	13	1,490	1,964; Feb 15 vs. North Dakota St	19,382	45.2%
North Dakota State	Scheels Center	5,460	13	956	2,210; Jan 25 vs. North Dakota	12,428	17.5%
Omaha	Baxter Arena	7,898	13	876	4,866; Nov 7 vs. College of Saint Mary	11,397	11.1%
Oral Roberts	Mabee Center	10,154	13	2,028	4,836; Nov 4 vs. Northeastern State	26,376	20.0%
St. Thomas	Schoenecker Arena	1,800	14	417	733; Jan 22 vs. South Dakota St	5,838	23.2%
South Dakota	Sanford Coyote Sports Center	6,000	16	1,617	2,956; Jan 25 vs. South Dakota St	25,872	27.0%
South Dakota State	First Bank and Trust Arena	6,500	15	2,942	4,582; Nov 17 vs. No. 16 Duke	44,141	45.3%

Bold - Exceed capacity
As of March 1, 2025
Does not include exhibition games

== Head coaches ==
=== Coaching changes ===
==== South Dakota ====
On April 23, 2024, Kayla Karius left South Dakota after two seasons to return to Green Bay as head coach. Soon after, on April 30, 2024, former Idaho head coach Carrie Eighmey was named as the Coyotes' new head coach.

=== Coaches ===
Note: Stats shown are before the beginning of the season. Overall and Summit League records are from time at current school.

Team	Head coach	Previous job	Seasons at school	Overall record	Summit record	Summit titles	NCAA tournaments	NCAA Sweet Sixteen	NCAA Championships
Denver	Doshia Woods	Tulane (recruiting coordinator)	5th	37–76 (.327)	23–43 (.348)	0	0	0	0
Kansas City	Dionnah Jackson-Durrett	Texas (Associate head coach)	3rd	21–53 (.284)	6–28 (.176)	0	0	0	0
North Dakota	Mallory Bernhard	North Dakota (assistant)	5th	45–68 (.398)	27–40 (.403)	0	0	0	0
North Dakota State	Jory Collins	Kansas (assistant)	6th	77–70 (.524)	48-36 (.571)	0	0	0	0
Omaha	Carrie Banks	Ohio State (assistant)	5th	37–72 (.339)	18–45 (.286)	0	0	0	0
Oral Roberts	Kelsi Musick	Southwestern Oklahoma State	3rd	33–30 (.524)	19–15 (.559)	0	0	0	0
St. Thomas	Ruth Sinn	Apple Valley HS	20th	391–142 (.734)	18–34 (.346) †	0	0	0	0
South Dakota	Carrie Eighmey	Idaho	1st	0–0 (–)	0–0 (–)	0	0	0	0
South Dakota State	Aaron Johnston	South Dakota State (assistant)	25th	598–191 (.758)	244–34 (.878)	11	12	1	0

Notes:

- † St. Thomas joined the Summit League in the summer of 2021.
- Overall and Summit League records, conference titles, etc. are from time at current school and are through the end the 2023–24 season.
- NCAA tournament appearances are from time at current school only.

== Awards and honors ==
=== Players of the week ===
Throughout the regular season, the Summit League offices will name one or two players of the week each Monday.

Week	Player(s) of the Week	School
Nov. 11	Jade Hill	St. Thomas
Nov. 18	Ruthie Udoumoh	Oral Roberts
Nov. 25	Jalei Oglesby	Oral Roberts (2)
Dec. 2	Grace Larkins	South Dakota
Dec. 9	Marisa Frost	North Dakota State
Dec. 16	Jade Hill (2)	St. Thomas (2)
Dec. 23	Taleyah Jones	Oral Roberts (3)
Dec. 30	Amber Scalia	St. Thomas (3)
Jan. 6	Grace Larkins (2)	South Dakota (2)
Jan. 13	Grace Larkins (3)	South Dakota (3)
Jan. 20	Alayna Contreras	Kansas City
Jan. 20	Brooklyn Meyer	South Dakota State
Jan. 27	Abbie Draper	North Dakota State (2)
Feb. 3	Grace Larkins (4)	South Dakota (4)
Feb. 10	Grace Larkins (5)	South Dakota (5)
Feb. 24	Ja Harvey	Omaha
Feb. 24	Brooklyn Meyer (2)	South Dakota State (2)
Mar. 3	Avery Koenen	North Dakota State (3)

=== All–League Honors ===
The All-Summit League teams and individual awards were announced on March 4, ahead of the Summit League tournament.

2025 Summit League Women's Basketball Individual Awards
Award	Recipient(s)
Player of the Year	Grace Larkins – South Dakota
Newcomer of the Year	Ja Harvey – Omaha
Freshman of the Year	Jocelyn Schiller – North Dakota
Sixth Woman of the Year	Jalei Oglesby – Oral Roberts
Defensive Player of the Year	Fatima Ibrahim – North Dakota
Coach of the Year	Aaron Johnston – South Dakota State

Honor	Recipient
All-Summit League First Team	Grace Larkins, South Dakota
All-Summit League First Team	Taleyah Jones, Oral Roberts
All-Summit League First Team	Avery Koenen, North Dakota State
All-Summit League First Team	Brooklyn Meyer, South Dakota State
All-Summit League First Team	Paige Meyer, South Dakota State
All-Summit League First Team	Jalei Oglesby, Oral Roberts
All-Summit League Second Team	Grace Cave, Omaha
All-Summit League Second Team	Alayna Contreras, Kansas City
All-Summit League Second Team	Abbie Draper, North Dakota State
All-Summit League Second Team	Jordan Jones, Denver
All-Summit League Second Team	Kiera Pemberton, North Dakota
All-Summit League Honorable Mention	Ja Harvey, Omaha,
All-Summit League Honorable Mention	Jade Hill, St. Thomas
All-Summit League Honorable Mention	Jo Langbehn, St. Thomas
All-Summit League Honorable Mention	Amber Scalia, St. Thomas
All-Summit League Honorable Mention	Haleigh Timmer, South Dakota State
All-Defensive Team	Mesa Byom, South Dakota State
All-Defensive Team	Fatima Ibrahim, North Dakota
All-Defensive Team	Grace Larkins, South Dakota
All-Defensive Team	Brooklyn Meyer, South Dakota State
All-Defensive Team	Paige Meyer, South Dakota State
All-Newcomer Team	Ja Harvey, Omaha
All-Newcomer Team	Molly Lenz, North Dakota State
All-Newcomer Team	Ana Oliveria, Kansas City
All-Newcomer Team	Aaliyah Moore, Omaha
All-Newcomer Team	Laia Monclova, Denver
All-Freshman Team	Marisa Frost, North Dakota State
All-Freshman Team	Alyssa Sand, St. Thomas
All-Freshman Team	Jocelyn Schiller, North Dakota
All-Freshman Team	Katie Vasecka, South Dakota State
All-Freshman Team	Harriet Ford, Omaha

== Postseason ==
=== Summit League tournament ===
All 9 teams qualified for the Summit League tournament. It was held at the Denny Sanford Premier Center in Sioux Falls, South Dakota. The tournament was held from March 5 to March 9, 2025.

First Round; March 5 Summit League Network
8	Omaha	76
9	Denver	68

Quarterfinals; March 6 & 7 Summit League Network
1	South Dakota State	87
8	Omaha	67
4	St. Thomas	67
5	North Dakota	80
2	Oral Roberts	70
7	South Dakota	50
3	North Dakota State	58
6	Kansas City	68

Semifinals; March 8 Summit League Network
1	South Dakota State	84
5	North Dakota	55
2	Oral Roberts	95
6	Kansas City	73

Championship; March 9 CBS Sports Network
1	South Dakota State	84
2	Oral Roberts	68

=== NCAA tournament ===
Only South Dakota State was selected to participate in the tournament as the conference's automatic bid.

Seed	Region	School	First round	Second round	Sweet Sixteen	Elite Eight	Final Four	Championship
No. 10	Spokane Regional 4	South Dakota State	defeated No. 7 Oklahoma State	lost to No. 2 UConn	—	—	—	
	1 Bid	W-L (%):	1–0 (1.000)	0–1 (.000)	0–0 (–)	0–0 (–)	0–0 (–)	TOTAL: 1–1 (.500)

=== WBIT ===
Oral Roberts was selected to participate in the tournament as an at-large bid.

School	First round	Second round	Quarterfinal	Semifinal	Championship
Oral Roberts	lost to No. 3 Missouri State	—	—	—	
1 Bid W-L (%):	0–1 (.000)	0–0 (–)	0–0 (–)	0–0 (–)	TOTAL: 0–1 (.000)

=== WNIT ===
North Dakota State was selected to participate in the tournament as an at-large bid.

School	First round	Second round	Super 16	Great 8	Fab Four	Championship
North Dakota State	Bye	defeated New Mexico State	defeated Washington State	lost to Troy	—	
1 Bid W-L (%):	0–0 (–)	1–0 (1.000)	1–0 (1.000)	0–1 (.000)	0–0 (–)	TOTAL: 2–1 (.667)
