= 2024–25 South Dakota State Jackrabbits women's basketball team =

Intercollegiate basketball season

2024–25 South Dakota State Jackrabbits women's basketball

Summit League regular season and tournament champions

NCAA tournament, Second Round
- Conference: Summit League

Ranking
- Coaches: No. 23
- AP: No. 24
- Record: 30–4 (16–0 Summit)
- Head coach: Aaron Johnston (25th full, 26th overall season)
- Assistant coaches: Sadie Thramer (4th season); Macy Miller (1st season); Kacie Jones (1st season); Shelby Selland (4th season); Erika Sage (4th season)
- Home arena: First Bank and Trust Arena

2024–25 Summit League women's basketball standings
	Conf.				Overall
Team	W		L	PCT	W		L	PCT
No. 24 South Dakota State †	16	–	0	1.000	30	–	4	.882
Oral Roberts	12	–	4	.750	24	–	9	.727
North Dakota State	11	–	5	.688	21	–	12	.636
St. Thomas*	9	–	7	.563	16	–	14	.533
North Dakota	6	–	10	.375	12	–	19	.387
Kansas City	6	–	10	.375	12	–	21	.364
South Dakota	5	–	11	.313	11	–	20	.355
Omaha	5	–	11	.313	14	–	17	.452
Denver	2	–	14	.125	9	–	21	.300
† 2025 Summit League tournament winner * Ineligible for the 2025 NCAA tournament due to transition from Division III; Rankings from AP poll

The 2024–25 South Dakota State Jackrabbits women's basketball team represented South Dakota State University in the 2024–25 NCAA Division I women's basketball season. The Jackrabbits were led by twenty-fifth-year head coach Aaron Johnston, and competed in the Summit League. They played their home games in First Bank and Trust Arena in Brookings, South Dakota.

== Previous season ==
The Jackrabbits went 27–6 overall and 16–0 in conference play. They finished in first place in the conference during the season, and were the first overall seed for the Summit League tournament. After a bye in the first round, their second round matchup was against ninth seed Omaha. The Jackrabbits made quick work, winning 66–53. The semi-finals matchup was against in-state rival and fourth seed South Dakota with the Jackrabbits winning 76–63. The Jackrabbits reached the Summit League tournament finals for the third year in a row and six of the past seven years, this year against second seed North Dakota State. The Jackrabbits won the championship 67–54, winning all the Summit League Tournament games by 13 points.

With the win in the Summit League tournament, the Jackrabbits received an automatic bid to the NCAA tournament. During the selection show, it was announced the that Jackrabbits would be placed in the Portland regional 4 as the 12 seed with a first round matchup against Pac-12 opponent Utah. The Utes finished the Jackrabbits' season, winning 68–54.

=== Departures ===
Name	Number	Pos.	Height	Year	Hometown	Reason for departure
Isabel Aesoph	4	G	5'6"	Sophomore	Orient, South Dakota	Left the team
Tori Tollefson	15	G	5'7"	Senior	Chanhassen, Minnesota	Graduated
Tori Nelson	20	F	6'1"	Senior	Mendota Heights, Minnesota	Graduated
Natalie Nielsen	34	F	6'3"	RS freshman	Akron, Iowa	Transferred to Southwest Minnesota State

=== 2024 recruiting class ===
College recruiting
Name	Hometown	School	Height	Weight	Commit date
Mahli Abdouch; G	Sioux Falls, South Dakota	O'Gorman Catholic High School	5 ft 7 in (1.70 m)	N/A	Oct 4, 2021
Mahli Abdouch; G	Recruit ratings: Scout: Rivals: 247Sports: ESPN: (0)				
Jaidyn Dunn; F	Sioux Falls, South Dakota	Thomas Jefferson High School	6 ft 1 in (1.85 m)	N/A	May 14, 2022
Jaidyn Dunn; F	Recruit ratings: Scout: Rivals: 247Sports: ESPN: (0)				
Emilee Fox; G	Mount Vernon, South Dakota	Mount Vernon High School	5 ft 8 in (1.73 m)	N/A	Oct 7, 2021
Emilee Fox; G	Recruit ratings: Scout: Rivals: 247Sports: ESPN: (0)				
Claire Sheppard; G/F	Egan, South Dakota	Flandreau High School	6 ft 1 in (1.85 m)	N/A	Jun 24, 2022
Claire Sheppard; G/F	Recruit ratings: Scout: Rivals: 247Sports: ESPN: (0)				
Katie Vasecka; G	Tea, South Dakota	Tea Area High School	6 ft 2 in (1.88 m)	N/A	Nov 28, 2021
Katie Vasecka; G	Recruit ratings: Scout: Rivals: 247Sports: ESPN: (92)				
Overall recruit ranking:
Note: In many cases, Scout, Rivals, 247Sports, On3, and ESPN may conflict in their listings of height and weight.; In these cases, the average was taken. ESPN grades are on a 100-point scale.; Sources: "2024 Team Ranking". Rivals.

== Roster ==
2024–25 South Dakota State Jackrabbits women's basketball team
Players
Coaches

Pos.	#	Name	Height	Year	Previous school	Hometown
G	2	Jenna Hopp	5 ft 11 in (1.8 m)	So	Glenwood Senior High School	Glenwood, IA
G	3	Madison Mathiowetz	5 ft 10 in (1.78 m)	Jr	St. Mary's High School	Sleepy Eye, MN
G	4	Emilee Fox	5 ft 8 in (1.73 m)	Fr	Mount Vernon High School	Mount Vernon SD
G	5	Ellie Colbeck	5 ft 10 in (1.78 m)	Jr	Kennedy Secondary School	Fergus Falls, MN
F	12	Kallie Theisen	6 ft 1 in (1.85 m)	RS Sr	Wayzata High School	Plymouth, MN
G	13	Haleigh Timmer	5 ft 11 in (1.8 m)	RS Jr	St. Thomas More High School	Rapid City, SD
G	15	Mahli Abdouch	5 ft 7 in (1.7 m)	Fr	O'Gorman Catholic High School	Sioux Falls, SD
G	21	Paige Meyer	5 ft 6 in (1.68 m)	Sr	Albany High School	Albany, MN
F	22	Madysen Vlastuin	6 ft 1 in (1.85 m)	Sr	Lennox High School	Lennox, SD
G	23	Katie Vasecka	6 ft 2 in (1.88 m)	Fr	Tea Area High School	Tea, SD
F	24	Mesa Byom	6 ft 2 in (1.88 m)	Sr	Melrose-Mindoro High School	Melrose, WI
G	30	Hilary Behrens	6 ft 0 in (1.83 m)	RS Fr	Brandon Valley High School	Brandon, SD
F	31	Brooklyn Meyer	6 ft 2 in (1.88 m)	Jr	West Lyon Community School	Larchwood, IA
G/F	32	Claire Sheppard	6 ft 1 in (1.85 m)	Fr	Flandreau High School	Egan, SD
F	45	Jaidyn Dunn	6 ft 1 in (1.85 m)	Fr	Thomas Jefferson High School	Sioux Falls, SD

Head coach

- Aaron Johnston (Gustavus Adolphus)

Assistant coach(es)

- Sadie Thramer (Wayne State (NE))
- Macy Miller (South Dakota State)
- Kacie Jones (Wayne State)
- Shelby Selland (South Dakota State)
- Erika Sage (Northwestern College (IA))

Legend

- (C) Team captain
- (S) Suspended
- (I) Ineligible
- (W) Walk-on
- Injured
- Current redshirt

Roster

== Schedule and results ==
Date time, TV	Rank^{#}	Opponent^{#}	Result	Record	Site (attendance) city, state
Exhibition
October 30, 2024*; 6:00 pm		St. Cloud State	W 77–44	–	First Bank and Trust Arena; Brookings, SD
Non-conference regular season
November 4, 2024*; 7:00 pm, ESPN+		at Rice	W 65–63	1–0	Tudor Fieldhouse (603); Houston, TX
November 8, 2024*; 6:00 pm, Summit League Network		No. 21 Creighton	W 76–71	2–0	First Bank and Trust Arena (3,208); Brookings, SD
November 13, 2024*; 7:00 pm, SLN		Wisconsin	W 79–57	3–0	First Bank and Trust Arena (3,167); Brookings, SD
November 17, 2024*; 2:30 pm, CBSSN		No. 16 Duke	L 71–75	3–1	First Bank and Trust Arena (4,582); Brookings, SD
November 23, 2024*; 7:00 pm, BallerTV		vs. Georgia Tech; Hawaii North Shore Showcase	L 57–71	3–2	George Q. Cannon Activities Center (425); Lāʻie, HI
November 26, 2024*; 7:00 pm, BallerTV		vs. No. 21 Oregon; Hawaii North Shore Showcase	W 75–70	4–2	George Q. Cannon Activities Center; Lāʻie, HI
December 1, 2024*; 12:00 pm, ESPN+		Ball State	W 63–55	5–2	First Bank and Trust Arena (1,200); Brookings, SD
December 4, 2024*; 7:00 pm, SLN		Eastern Washington; Big Sky–Summit Challenge	W 81–58	6–2	First Bank and Trust Arena (2,124); Brookings, SD
December 7, 2024*; 3:00 pm, ESPN+		at Montana; Big Sky–Summit Challenge	W 78–70	7–2	Dahlberg Arena (2,031); Missoula, MT
December 11, 2024*; 7:00 pm, SLN		Dakota Wesleyan	W 76–48	8–2	First Bank and Trust Arena (1,555); Brookings, SD
December 14, 2024*; 2:00 pm, Midco Sports 2/SLN		Northern Iowa	W 68–53	9–2	First Bank and Trust Arena (2,156); Brookings, SD
December 17, 2024*; 7:00 pm, SLN		Dakota State	W 84–47	10–2	First Bank and Trust Arena (1,431); Brookings, SD
December 22, 2024*; 2:00 pm, SECN+/ESPN+		at No. 6 Texas	L 57–103	10–3	Moody Center (7,020); Austin, TX
Summit League regular season
January 2, 2025; 7:00 pm, SLN		at Oral Roberts	W 81–76	11–3 (1–0)	Mabee Center (2,891); Tulsa, OK
January 4, 2025; 2:00 pm, SLN		at Denver	W 79–42	12–3 (2–0)	Hamilton Gymnasium (553); Denver, CO
January 9, 2025; 7:00 pm, SLN		Omaha	W 93–55	13–3 (3–0)	First Bank and Trust Arena (2,074); Brookings, SD
January 11, 2025; 2:00 pm, SLN		Kansas City	W 78–61	14–3 (4–0)	First Bank and Trust Arena (2,848); Brookings, SD
January 18, 2025; 2:00 pm, SLN		North Dakota	W 87–73	15–3 (5–0)	First Bank and Trust Arena (3,129); Brookings, SD
January 22, 2025; 7:00 pm, SLN		at St. Thomas	W 83–76	16–3 (6–0)	Schoenecker Arena (733); St. Paul, MN
January 25, 2025; 1:00 pm, SLN		at South Dakota	W 77–59	17–3 (7–0)	Sanford Coyote Sports Center (2,956); Vermillion, SD
January 29, 2025; 7:00 pm, SLN		North Dakota State	W 63–55	18–3 (8–0)	First Bank and Trust Arena (4,156); Brookings, SD
February 1, 2025; 2:00 pm, SLN		at Omaha	W 93–63	19–3 (9–0)	Baxter Arena (930); Omaha, NE
February 5, 2025; 7:00 pm, SLN		at North Dakota	W 66–45	20–3 (10–0)	Betty Engelstad Sioux Center (1,529); Grand Forks, ND
February 8, 2025; 11:00 am, CBSSN		Oral Roberts	W 89–71	21–3 (11–0)	First Bank and Trust Arena (2,631); Brookings, SD
February 12, 2025; 7:00 pm, SLN		at North Dakota State	W 68–53	22–3 (12–0)	Scheels Center (1,158); Fargo, ND
February 15, 2025; 2:00 pm, SLN		South Dakota	W 71–61	23–3 (13–0)	First Bank and Trust Arena (4,214); Brookings, SD
February 22, 2025; 2:00 pm, SLN		at Kansas City	W 80–60	24–3 (14–0)	Swinney Recreation Center (714); Kansas City, MO
February 27, 2025; 7:00 pm, SLN		Denver	W 71–37	25–3 (15–0)	First Bank and Trust Arena (2,784); Brookings, SD
March 1, 2025; 2:00 pm, SLN		St. Thomas	W 79–46	26–3 (16–0)	Frost Arena (4,082); Brookings, SD
Summit League tournament
March 6, 2025*; 2:30 pm, SLN	(1) No. 25	vs. (8) Omaha; Quarterfinals	W 87–67	27–3	Denny Sanford Premier Center (7,195); Sioux Falls, SD
March 8, 2025*; 12:00 pm, SLN	(1) No. 25	vs. (5) North Dakota; Semifinals	W 84–55	28–3	Denny Sanford Premier Center; Sioux Falls, SD
March 9, 2025*; 3:00 pm, CBSSN	(1) No. 25	vs. (2) Oral Roberts; Championship	W 84–68	29–3	Denny Sanford Premier Center; Sioux Falls, SD
NCAA tournament
March 21, 2025*; 2:30 pm, ESPN2	(10 S4) No. 24	vs. (7 S4) No. 17 Oklahoma State; First round	W 74–68	30–3	Harry A. Gampel Pavilion; Storrs, CT
March 23, 2025*; 7:00 pm, ESPN	(10 S4) No. 24	at (2 S4) No. 3 UConn; Second round	L 57–91	30–4	Harry A. Gampel Pavilion (10,299); Storrs, CT
*Non-conference game. ^{#}Rankings from AP Poll. (#) Tournament seedings in parentheses. S4=Spokane 4. All times are in Central Time Zone.

== Rankings ==
Ranking movements Legend: ██ Increase in ranking ██ Decrease in ranking — = Not ranked RV = Received votes т = Tied with team above or below
	Week																				
Poll	Pre	1	2	3	4	5	6	7	8	9	10	11	12	13	14	15	16	17	18	19	Final
AP	RV	RV	RV	—	RV	RV	RV	—	—	—	—	RV	RV	RV	RV	RV	RV	25	24	24	
Coaches	RV	25	RV	—	RV	RV	RV	—	—	RV	RV	RV	RV	25	24	24	25	24т	23	23	
