= 2024–25 Kansas City Roos women's basketball team =

American college basketball season

2024–25 Kansas City Roos women's basketball
- Conference: Summit League
- Record: 10–21 (6–10 Summit)
- Head coach: Dionnah Jackson-Durrett (3rd season)
- Associate head coach: Wanika Owsley
- Assistant coaches: Stacy Stephens; Alexis Lawrence; Sammy Smith
- Home arena: Swinney Recreation Center

2024–25 Summit League women's basketball standings
	Conf.				Overall
Team	W		L	PCT	W		L	PCT
No. 24 South Dakota State †	16	–	0	1.000	30	–	4	.882
Oral Roberts	12	–	4	.750	24	–	9	.727
North Dakota State	11	–	5	.688	21	–	12	.636
St. Thomas*	9	–	7	.563	16	–	14	.533
North Dakota	6	–	10	.375	12	–	19	.387
Kansas City	6	–	10	.375	12	–	21	.364
South Dakota	5	–	11	.313	11	–	20	.355
Omaha	5	–	11	.313	14	–	17	.452
Denver	2	–	14	.125	9	–	21	.300
† 2025 Summit League tournament winner * Ineligible for the 2025 NCAA tournament due to transition from Division III; Rankings from AP poll

The 2024–25 Kansas City Roos women's basketball team represented the University of Missouri–Kansas City during the 2024–25 NCAA Division I women's basketball season. The Roos, led by third-year head coach Dionnah Jackson-Durrett, played their home games at the Swinney Recreation Center in Kansas City, Missouri as members of the Summit League.

== Previous season ==
The Roos finished the 2023–24 season 12–20, 3–13 in Summit League play, to finish in a tie for last place. They were defeated by Omaha in the first round of the Summit League tournament.

== Preseason ==
On October 8, 2024, the Summit League released the preseason coaches poll. Kansas City was picked to finish eighth in the Summit League regular season.

=== Preseason rankings ===
Summit League preseason poll
Predicted finish	Team	Votes (1st place)
1	South Dakota State	562 (34)
2	Oral Roberts	479 (1)
3	North Dakota State	427 (1)
4	South Dakota	363
5	St. Thomas	336
6	Denver	220
7	North Dakota	188
8	Kansas City	144
9	Omaha	116

=== Preseason All-Summit League ===
No Roos were named to the first or second Preseason All-Summit League teams.

== Roster ==
2024–25 Kansas City Roos women's basketball team
Players
Coaches

Pos.	#	Name	Height	Year	Previous school	Hometown
G	0	Emani Bennett	5 ft 11 in (1.8 m)	So	Lee's Summit North High School	Lee's Summit, Missouri
G	1	Nikole Thomas	5 ft 9 in (1.75 m)	So	Memphis	Memphis, Tennessee
G	2	Elauni Bennett	5 ft 9 in (1.75 m)	So	Lee's Summit North High School	Lee's Summit, Missouri
G	3	Alayna Contreras	5 ft 6 in (1.68 m)	Jr	Cochise College	Minneapolis, Minnesota
F	5	Tamia Ugass	6 ft 3 in (1.91 m)	Sr	Roseville Area High School	Saint Paul, Minnesota
F	10	Funmi Amode	6 ft 0 in (1.83 m)	Jr	Salt Lake Community College	London, United Kingdom
F	11	Kelby Bannerman	6 ft 1 in (1.85 m)	Sr	Davidson	Hampshire, Illinois
G	12	Dea Pushkolli	5 ft 11 in (1.8 m)	So	Duquesne	Pristina, Kosovo
F	15	Kaia Ponder	6 ft 0 in (1.83 m)	Jr	Morgan State	Dallas, Texas
F/C	20	Chloe Dallas	6 ft 3 in (1.91 m)	Jr	Wabash Valley College	Milwaukee, Wisconsin
G	21	Lisa Thomas	5 ft 5 in (1.65 m)	Sr	Johnson County Community College	Kansas City, Missouri
G	22	Ana Oliveira Dias	5 ft 6 in (1.68 m)	So	Salt Lake Community College	Porto Feliz, Brazil
G	23	Alyssa Febres	5 ft 5 in (1.65 m)	Fr	Monsignor Scanlan High School	Yonkers, New York
G	24	Zaire Harrell	5 ft 8 in (1.73 m)	Jr	Mary Institute and St. Louis Country Day School	St. Louis, Missouri
F/C	44	Zanaa Cordis	6 ft 3 in (1.91 m)	Sr	New Orleans	Junction City, Kansas

Head coach

- Dionnah Jackson-Durrett (Oklahoma)

Assistant coach(es)

- Wanika Owsley (Southeast Missouri State)
- Stacy Stephens (Texas)
- Alexis Lawrence (Missouri–St. Louis)
- Sammy Smith (Texas A&M)

Legend

- (C) Team captain
- (S) Suspended
- (I) Ineligible
- (W) Walk-on
- Injured
- Current redshirt

Roster
Last update: March 6, 2025

== Schedule and results ==
Date time, TV	Rank^{#}	Opponent^{#}	Result	Record	High points	High rebounds	High assists	Site (attendance) city, state
Exhibition
October 27, 2024*; 2:00 pm		Saint Mary	W 98–21	–	–	–	–	Swinney Recreation Center; Kansas City, MO
Non-conference regular season
November 4, 2024*; 7:00 pm		at Utah State	W 80–77	1–0	29 – Contreras	12 – Ugass	2 – Tied	Smith Spectrum (502); Logan, UT
November 6, 2024*; 7:00 pm, ESPN+		at Utah Valley	L 48–72	1–1	11 – Ugass	7 – Ugass	3 – Oliveira Dias	UCCU Center (539); Orem, UT
November 9, 2024*; 7:00 pm, SLN		William Jewell	W 74–32	2–1	13 – Em. Bennett	8 – Em. Bennett	4 – Febres	Swinney Recreation Center (355); Kansas City, MO
November 12, 2024*; 7:00 pm, ESPN+		at Western Illinois	L 43–62	2–2	12 – Tied	7 – Em. Bennett	6 – Oliveira Dias	Western Hall (623); Macomb, IL
November 19, 2024*; 11:00 am, Bulldogs All-Access		at Alabama A&M	L 52–57	2–3	11 – Tied	7 – El. Bennett	3 – Oliveira Dias	AAMU Event Center (4,237); Huntsville, AL
November 22, 2024*; 7:00 pm, SLN		Lindenwood	L 62–67	2–4	20 – Em. Bennett	8 – Ugass	3 – Oliveira Dias	Swinney Recreation Center (643); Kansas City, MO
November 26, 2024*; 7:00 pm, B1G+		at No. 25 Nebraska	L 38–84	2–5	11 – Em. Bennett	7 – Tied	1 – Tied	Pinnacle Bank Arena (4,753); Lincoln, NE
November 30, 2024*; 2:00 pm, SLN		UT Dallas	W 94–60	3–5	15 – Em. Bennett	7 – Em. Bennett	7 – Thomas	Swinney Recreation Center (141); Kansas City, MO
December 4, 2024*; 8:30 pm, ESPN+		at Sacramento State; Big Sky–Summit Challenge	L 57–74	3–6	15 – Contreras	13 – El. Bennett	3 – Oliveira Dias	Hornets Nest (329); Sacramento, CA
December 7, 2024*; 2:00 pm, SLN		Idaho State; Big Sky–Summit Challenge	L 50–67	3–7	23 – Em. Bennett	10 – Harrell	3 – Tied	Swinney Recreation Center (212); Kansas City, MO
December 11, 2024*; 6:00 pm, ESPN+		at Kansas	L 49–79	3–8	15 – Em. Bennett	8 – Bannerman	2 – Tied	Allen Fieldhouse (3,004); Lawrence, KS
December 15, 2024*; 2:00 pm, ESPN+		at Tulsa	L 61–89	3–9	22 – Contreras	8 – Bannerman	5 – Oliveira Dias	Reynolds Center (1,471); Tulsa, OK
December 19, 2024*; 4:00 pm, ESPN+		vs. Texas A&M–Corpus Christi; UTRGV Holiday Classic	L 59–64	3–10	27 – Em. Bennett	10 – Bannerman	5 – Thomas	UTRGV Fieldhouse (85); Edinburg, TX
December 20, 2024*; 6:30 pm, ESPN+		at UT Rio Grande Valley; UTRGV Holiday Classic	L 54–71	3–11	20 – Contreras	9 – El. Bennett	6 – Thomas	UTRGV Fieldhouse (258); Edinburg, TX
December 29, 2024*; 2:00 pm, SLN		Westminster (MO)	W 103–49	4–11	22 – Em. Bennett	21 – El. Bennett	7 – Thomas	Swinney Recreation Center (225); Kansas City, MO
Summit League regular season
January 2, 2025; 2:00 pm, SLN		at St. Thomas	L 0–2 Forfeit (Note: The game was originally won by Kansas City 76–69. However, on January 7, Kansas City self-reported a rules violation, resulting in a St. Thomas forfeit win. Despite this, the stats from the game will still be counted.)	4–12 (0–1)	26 – Tied	9 – Harrell	6 – Thomas	Schoenecker Arena (274); St. Paul, MN
January 4, 2025; 1:00 pm, SLN		North Dakota	L 60–63	4–13 (0–2)	16 – Contreras	7 – El. Bennett	3 – Tied	Swinney Recreation Center (345); Kansas City, MO
January 11, 2025; 2:00 pm, SLN		at South Dakota State	L 61–78	4–14 (0–3)	24 – Contreras	5 – Tied	1 – Tied	First Bank and Trust Arena (2,848); Brookings, SD
January 15, 2025; 7:00 pm, SLN		Denver	W 73–66 ^{OT}	5–14 (1–3)	31 – Contreras	8 – Tied	5 – Oliveira Dias	Swinney Recreation Center (392); Kansas City, MO
January 18, 2025; 2:00 pm, SLN		North Dakota State	W 56–51	6–14 (2–3)	16 – Em. Bennett	8 – Ugass	4 – Contreras	Swinney Recreation Center (313); Kansas City, MO
January 22, 2025; 7:00 pm, SLN		Oral Roberts	L 61–74	6–15 (2–4)	20 – Contreras	10 – Ugass	3 – Tied	Swinney Recreation Center (372); Kansas City, MO
January 25, 2025; 1:00 pm, SLN		at Omaha	W 66–65	7–15 (3–4)	32 – Contreras	12 – Ugass	4 – Tied	Baxter Arena (475); Omaha, NE
January 30, 2025; 7:00 pm, SLN		South Dakota	W 77–54	8–15 (4–4)	24 – Em. Bennett	10 – Thomas	9 – Thomas	Swinney Recreation Center (365); Kansas City, MO
February 5, 2025; 7:00 pm, SLN		at Denver	W 73–65	9–15 (5–4)	30 – Em. Bennett	9 – El. Bennett	4 – Thomas	Hamilton Gymnasium (351); Denver, CO
February 8, 2025; 1:00 pm, SLN		Omaha	L 56–65	9–16 (5–5)	15 – El. Bennett	8 – El. Bennett	6 – Oliveira Dias	Swinney Recreation Center (566); Kansas City, MO
February 12, 2025; 7:00 pm, SLN		at South Dakota	L 56–63	9–17 (5–6)	22 – Contreras	10 – El. Bennett	3 – Oliveira Dias	Sanford Coyote Sports Center (1,419); Vermillion, SD
February 15, 2025; 5:00 pm, SLN		at Oral Roberts	L 88–109	9–18 (5–7)	33 – Contreras	14 – El. Bennett	3 – Contreras	Mabee Center (1,311); Tulsa, OK
February 20, 2025; 1:00 pm, SLN		St. Thomas	W 91–82	10–18 (6–7)	22 – Tied	11 – Ugass	6 – Contreras	Swinney Recreation Center (419); Kansas City, MO
February 22, 2025; 2:00 pm, SLN		South Dakota State	L 60–80	10–19 (6–8)	24 – Contreras	7 – Harrell	4 – Thomas	Swinney Recreation Center (714); Kansas City, MO
February 27, 2025; 7:00 pm, SLN		at North Dakota State	L 67–93	10–20 (6–9)	16 – Contreras	6 – El. Bennett	5 – Oliveira Dias	Scheels Center (685); Fargo, ND
March 1, 2025; 7:00 pm, SLN		at North Dakota	L 79–83	10–21 (6–10)	35 – Contreras	12 – El. Bennett	3 – Thomas	Betty Engelstad Sioux Center (1,713); Grand Forks, ND
Summit League tournament
March 7, 2025; 2:30 pm, SLN	(6)	vs. (3) North Dakota State; Quarterfinals						Denny Sanford Premier Center; Sioux Falls, SD
*Non-conference game. ^{#}Rankings from AP poll. (#) Tournament seedings in parentheses. All times are in Central.
