= 2024–25 South Dakota Coyotes women's basketball team =

American college basketball season

2024–25 South Dakota Coyotes women's basketball
- Conference: Summit League
- Record: 11–19 (5–11 Summit)
- Head coach: Carrie Eighmey (1st season)
- Assistant coaches: Amber Cunningham; Chris Guess; Devin Eighmey
- Home arena: Sanford Coyote Sports Center

2024–25 Summit League women's basketball standings
	Conf.				Overall
Team	W		L	PCT	W		L	PCT
No. 24 South Dakota State †	16	–	0	1.000	30	–	4	.882
Oral Roberts	12	–	4	.750	24	–	9	.727
North Dakota State	11	–	5	.688	21	–	12	.636
St. Thomas*	9	–	7	.563	16	–	14	.533
North Dakota	6	–	10	.375	12	–	19	.387
Kansas City	6	–	10	.375	12	–	21	.364
South Dakota	5	–	11	.313	11	–	20	.355
Omaha	5	–	11	.313	14	–	17	.452
Denver	2	–	14	.125	9	–	21	.300
† 2025 Summit League tournament winner * Ineligible for the 2025 NCAA tournament due to transition from Division III; Rankings from AP poll

The 2024–25 South Dakota Coyotes women's basketball team represented the University of South Dakota in the 2024–25 NCAA Division I women's basketball season. The Coyotes were led by first-year head coach Carrie Eighmey, who was hired in April 2024 after former coach Kayla Karius left for the head coaching job at Green Bay. The Coyotes compete in the Summit League and play home games at the Sanford Coyote Sports Center in Vermillion, South Dakota.

== Previous season ==
The Coyotes finished the 2023–24 season 23–13, 9–7 in Summit League play to finish in fourth place. In the Summit League tournament, the Coyotes defeated St. Thomas in the quarterfinals but fell to South Dakota State in the semifinals. After the conference tournament, South Dakota was invited to the 2024 Women's National Invitation Tournament and hosted two games. The Coyotes defeated UC Riverside in the first round, and Northern Arizona in the second round, before falling to Wyoming in the Super 16.

== Roster ==
2024–25 South Dakota Coyotes women's basketball team
Players
Coaches

Pos.	#	Name	Height	Year	Previous school	Hometown
G	0	Olivia Kieffer	5 ft 10 in (1.78 m)	So	Rapid City Christian High School	Rapid City, SD
F	1	Gabby Wilke	6 ft 2 in (1.88 m)	Fr	Beaver Dam High School	Beaver Dam, WI
G	3	Coral Mason	5 ft 10 in (1.78 m)	So	Viborg-Hurley High School	Hurley, SD
G	5	Viki Matulevicius	5 ft 8 in (1.73 m)	Fr	Montini Catholic High School	Willowbrook, IL
G	10	Adara Groman	5 ft 8 in (1.73 m)	Sr	New Hampshire	Scituate, MA
G	11	Addison Klosterbuer	5 ft 11 in (1.8 m)	RS Fr	Central Lyon High School	Little Rock, IA
F	12	Karly Jasczak	6 ft 1 in (1.85 m)	Fr	Pine City High School	Pine City, MN
F	14	Hannah Coons	6 ft 1 in (1.85 m)	Fr	Kiefer High School	Kiefer, OK
F	20	Carley Duffney	5 ft 10 in (1.78 m)	Jr	Preble High School	Green Bay, WI
G	21	Grace Larkins	5 ft 9 in (1.75 m)	Sr	Southeast Polk High School	Altoona, IA
G	24	Ava Cossette	5 ft 10 in (1.78 m)	Fr	Maple Grove Senior High School	Maple Grove, MN
G	25	Cassidy Carson	6 ft 1 in (1.85 m)	Jr	Eastview High School	Eagan, MN
C	32	Ruthie Loomis-Goltl	6 ft 3 in (1.91 m)	RS Fr	Colorado	Bridgeport, NE
F	33	Sophie Haydon	6 ft 1 in (1.85 m)	Sr	George Washington	Shorewood, MN
F	41	Alexi Hempe	6 ft 0 in (1.83 m)	Sr	TPLS Christian Academy	Fredericksburg, VA

Head coach

- Carrie Eighmey (Hastings)

Assistant coach(es)

- Amber Cunningham (South Dakota)
- Chris Guess (Graceland)
- Devin Eighmey (Missouri State)

Legend

- (C) Team captain
- (S) Suspended
- (I) Ineligible
- (W) Walk-on
- Injured
- Current redshirt

Roster
Last update: October 22, 2024

== Schedule and results ==
Date time, TV	Rank^{#}	Opponent^{#}	Result	Record	High points	High rebounds	High assists	Site (attendance) city, state
Non-conference regular season
November 4, 2024*; 5:30 pm, Summit League Network		Saint Louis	L 83–85 ^{OT}	0–1	27 – Larkins	13 – Larkins	6 – Larkins	Sanford Coyote Sports Center (1,953); Vermillion, SD
November 8, 2024*; 5:00 pm, Mountain West Network		at Air Force	L 66–73	0–2	15 – Larkins	9 – Larkins	6 – Larkins	Clune Arena (252); Colorado Springs, CO
November 13, 2024*; 7:00 pm, SLN		Loyola Marymount	L 67–71 ^{OT}	0–3	29 – Larkins	9 – Larkins	6 – Larkins	Sanford Coyote Sports Center (1,394); Vermillion, SD
November 16, 2024*; 7:00 pm, B1G+		vs. No. 21 Nebraska	L 70–113	0–4	28 – Larkins	5 – Larkins	6 – Larkins	Sanford Pentagon (3,297); Sioux Falls, SD
November 18, 2024*; 11:00 am, SLN		Bellevue	W 74–50	1–4	23 – Duffney	13 – Larkins	6 – Duffney	Sanford Coyote Sports Center (1,468); Vermillion, SD
November 21, 2024*; 7:00 pm, SLN		North Carolina Central	W 61–54	2–4	24 – Larkins	9 – Duffney	5 – Larkins	Sanford Coyote Sports Center (1,362); Vermillion, SD
November 26, 2024*; 11:00 am		vs. Dayton; Music City Classic	W 79–69	3–4	32 – Larkins	8 – Hempe	6 – Duffney	Trevecca Trojan Fieldhouse (221); Nashville, TN
November 27, 2024*; 11:00 am		vs. Arizona State; Music City Classic	L 88–95	3–5	30 – Larkins	7 – Larkins	11 – Larkins	Trevecca Trojan Fieldhouse (218); Nashville, TN
December 4, 2024*; 8:00 pm, ESPN+		at Montana State; Big Sky–Summit Challenge	L 46–77	3–6	14 – Hempe	9 – Duffney	3 – Mason	Brick Breeden Fieldhouse (1,527); Bozeman, MT
December 7, 2024*; 1:00 pm, SLN		Northern Arizona; Big Sky–Summit Challenge	W 84–79	4–6	21 – Larkins	9 – Duffney	5 – Larkins	Sanford Coyote Sports Center (1,423); Vermillion, SD
December 10, 2024*; 6:00 pm, ESPN+		at Northern Iowa	L 59–78	4–7	17 – Larkins	10 – Larkins	9 – Larkins	McLeod Center (2,360); Cedar Falls, IA
December 15, 2024*; 1:00 pm, SLN		Wyoming	L 45–79	4–8	12 – Larkins	12 – Larkins	3 – Larkins	Sanford Coyote Sports Center (1,485); Vermillion, SD
December 18, 2024*; 7:00 pm, SLN		Mount Marty	W 78–74	5–8	18 – Larkins	10 – Larkins	9 – Larkins	Sanford Coyote Sports Center (1,256); Vermillion, SD
December 20, 2024*; 7:00 pm, SLN		South Dakota Mines	W 75–31	6–8	27 – Larkins	8 – Larkins	3 – Larkins	Sanford Coyote Sports Center (1,151); Vermillion, SD
Summit League regular season
January 2, 2025; 7:00 pm, SLN		at Denver	W 77–71	7–8 (1–0)	29 – Larkins	13 – Larkins	7 – Larkins	Hamilton Gymnasium (390); Denver, CO
January 4, 2025; 2:00 pm		at Oral Roberts	L 70–82	7–9 (1–1)	29 – Larkins	12 – Larkins	3 – Tied	Mabee Center (1,633); Tulsa, OK
January 9, 2025; 7:00 pm, SLN		at St. Thomas	W 77–60	8–9 (2–1)	34 – Larkins	12 – Larkins	8 – Larkins	Sanford Coyote Sports Center (1,225); Vermillion, SD
January 11, 2025; 1:00 pm, SLN		Omaha	W 71–67	9–9 (3–1)	45 – Larkins	13 – Larkins	6 – Larkins	Sanford Coyote Sports Center (1,518); Vermillion, SD
January 15, 2025; 7:00 pm, SLN		at North Dakota	L 54–80	9–10 (3–2)	14 – Larkins	13 – Larkins	6 – Larkins	Betty Engelstad Sioux Center (1,841); Grand Forks, ND
January 22, 2025; 7:00 pm, SLN		North Dakota State	L 53–72	9–11 (3–3)	23 – Larkins	7 – Larkins	1 – Tied	Sanford Coyote Sports Center (1,442); Vermillion, SD
January 25, 2025; 1:00 pm, SLN		South Dakota State	L 59–77	9–12 (3–4)	27 – Larkins	7 – Larkins	8 – Larkins	Sanford Coyote Sports Center (2,956); Vermillion, SD
January 30, 2025; 7:00 pm, SLN		at Kansas City	L 54–77	9–13 (3–5)	17 – Duffney	8 – Larkins	7 – Larkins	Swinney Recreation Center (365); Kansas City, MO
February 1, 2025; 2:00 pm, SLN		North Dakota	W 76–66	10–13 (4–5)	39 – Larkins	12 – Larkins	4 – Larkins	Sanford Coyote Sports Center (2,042); Vermillion, SD
February 6, 2025; 7:00 pm, SLN		Oral Roberts	L 62–88	10–14 (4–6)	24 – Duffney	11 – Larkins	4 – Larkins	Sanford Coyote Sports Center (1,349); Vermillion, SD
February 8, 2025; 1:00 pm, SLN		at North Dakota State	L 65–75	10–15 (4–7)	47 – Larkins	8 – Larkins	2 – Tied	Scheels Center (1,037); Fargo, ND
February 12, 2025; 7:00 pm, SLN		Kansas City	W 63–56	11–15 (5–7)	21 – Wilke	10 – Larkins	4 – Duffney	Sanford Coyote Sports Center (1,419); Vermillion, SD
February 15, 2025; 2:00 pm, SLN		at No. RV South Dakota State	L 61–71	11–16 (5–8)	23 – Larkins	10 – Larkins	9 – Larkins	First Bank and Trust Arena (4,214); Brookings, SD
February 20, 2025; 7:00 pm, SLN		at Omaha	L 57–71	11–17 (5–9)	20 – Hempe	7 – Larkins	7 – Larkins	Baxter Arena (475); Omaha, NE
February 22, 2025; 1:00 pm, SLN		at St. Thomas	L 57–66	11–18 (5–10)	21 – Larkins	8 – Tied	9 – Larkins	Shoenecker Arena (413); St. Paul, MN
March 1, 2025; 1:00 pm, SLN		Denver	L 60–63	11–19 (5–11)	25 – Larkins	11 – Larkins	5 – Larkins	Sanford Coyote Sports Center (2,429); Vermillion, SD
Summit League tournament
March 6, 2025; 12:00 pm, SLN	(7)	vs. (2) Oral Roberts; Quarterfinal	L 50–70	11–20	24 – Larkins	13 – Larkins	5 – Larkins	Denny Sanford Premier Center; Sioux Falls, SD
*Non-conference game. ^{#}Rankings from AP poll. (#) Tournament seedings in parentheses. All times are in Central.
