= 2024–25 St. Thomas (Minnesota) Tommies women's basketball team =

American college basketball season

2024–25 St. Thomas (Minnesota) Tommies women's basketball
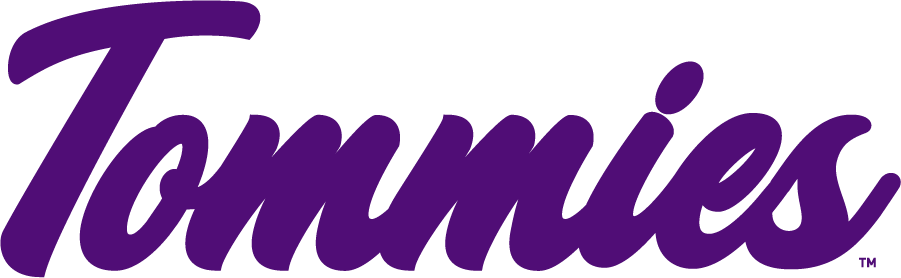
- Conference: Summit League
- Record: 17–13 (9–7 Summit)
- Head coach: Ruth Sinn (20th season)
- Assistant coaches: Madison McKeever; Tiana Jones
- Home arena: Schoenecker Arena

2024–25 Summit League women's basketball standings
	Conf.				Overall
Team	W		L	PCT	W		L	PCT
No. 24 South Dakota State †	16	–	0	1.000	30	–	4	.882
Oral Roberts	12	–	4	.750	24	–	9	.727
North Dakota State	11	–	5	.688	21	–	12	.636
St. Thomas*	9	–	7	.563	16	–	14	.533
North Dakota	6	–	10	.375	12	–	19	.387
Kansas City	6	–	10	.375	12	–	21	.364
South Dakota	5	–	11	.313	11	–	20	.355
Omaha	5	–	11	.313	14	–	17	.452
Denver	2	–	14	.125	9	–	21	.300
† 2025 Summit League tournament winner * Ineligible for the 2025 NCAA tournament due to transition from Division III; Rankings from AP poll

The 2024–25 St. Thomas Tommies women's basketball team represented the University of St. Thomas during the 2024–25 NCAA Division I women's basketball season. The Tommies, led by 20th-year head coach Ruth Sinn, played their home games at Schoenecker Arena in Saint Paul, Minnesota as members of the Summit League.

This season originally marked St. Thomas's fourth year of a five-year transition period from Division III to Division I, an incredibly rare and historic jump that bypasses Division II altogether. However, on January 15, 2025, the NCAA voted to amend the reclassification timeline for transitioning Division I institutions, reducing the Division III to Division I transition period from five years to four. With the transition period timeline amended, St. Thomas would be eligible for NCAA postseason play in the 2025–26 season as long as the university is able to meet the new standards set (such as academic requirements).

Additionally, this season marked the final year the Tommies played their home games in Schoenecker Arena, as their new on-campus arena, the Lee and Penny Anderson Arena is set to open in time for the start of the 2025–26 season.

== Previous season ==
The Tommies finished the 2023–24 season 15–16, 7–9 in Summit League play, to finish in fifth place. They were defeated by South Dakota in the quarterfinals of the Summit League tournament.

== Roster ==
2024–25 St. Thomas (Minnesota) Tommies women's basketball team
Players
Coaches

Pos.	#	Name	Height	Year	Previous school	Hometown
G	2	Lizzie Steingraber	5 ft 9 in (1.75 m)	So	New London High School	New London, Wisconsin
G	3	Riley Wright	5 ft 11 in (1.8 m)	Jr	Northern Iowa	Marion, Iowa
G	4	Jade Hill	5 ft 7 in (1.7 m)	Sr	South High School	Minneapolis, Minnesota
G	5	Faith Feuerbach	6 ft 0 in (1.83 m)	Jr	Sycamore High School	Sycamore, Illinois
G	11	Zoey Washington	5 ft 8 in (1.73 m)	So	St. Croix Lutheran Academy	Mahtomedi, Minnesota
G	12	Mikayla Werner	6 ft 0 in (1.83 m)	Fr	Hortonville High School	Hortonville, Wisconsin
G	13	Gabby Johnson	5 ft 8 in (1.73 m)	Sr	Freedom High School	Freedom, Wisconsin
F	14	Jordyn Lamker	6 ft 0 in (1.83 m)	Sr	Maple Grove High School	Maple Grove, Minnesota
G	15	Phoebe Frentzel	5 ft 9 in (1.75 m)	Sr	Arrowhead High School	Pewaukee, Wisconsin
F	20	Sammy Opichka	6 ft 0 in (1.83 m)	Sr	Notre Dame Academy	Green Bay, Wisconsin
G	21	Amber Scalia	5 ft 9 in (1.75 m)	Jr	Stillwater High School	Stillwater, Minnesota
G	22	Abbey Vallance	5 ft 8 in (1.73 m)	Fr	Tara Anglican School	Sydney, Australia
F	24	Alyssa Sand	6 ft 3 in (1.91 m)	Fr	Albany High School	Albany, Minnesota
G	30	Laura Hauge	5 ft 9 in (1.75 m)	Fr	St. Croix Lutheran Academy	West St. Paul, Minnesota
F	32	Savanah Gardner	5 ft 10 in (1.78 m)	Fr	Eastview High School	Apple Valley, Minnesota
G	33	Kammie Ludwig	5 ft 10 in (1.78 m)	Jr	Providence	Geneseo, Illinois
C	34	Jo Langbehn	6 ft 2 in (1.88 m)	Sr	Elk River High School	Elk River, Minnesota

Head coach

- Ruth Sinn (St. Thomas)

Assistant coach(es)

- Madison McKeever (South Dakota)
- Tiana Jones (Drexel)

Legend

- (C) Team captain
- (S) Suspended
- (I) Ineligible
- (W) Walk-on
- Injured
- Current redshirt

Roster
Last update: March 4, 2025

== Schedule and results ==
Date time, TV	Rank^{#}	Opponent^{#}	Result	Record	High points	High rebounds	High assists	Site (attendance) city, state
Non-conference regular season
November 4, 2024*; 5:00 pm, SLN		Milwaukee	W 84–81 ^{OT}	1–0	35 – Hill	13 – Opichka	4 – Langbehn	Schoenecker Arena (538); St. Paul, MN
November 7, 2024*; 7:00 pm, SLN		Crown	W 99–33	2–0	15 – Langbehn	8 – Werner	5 – Hill	Schoenecker Arena (307); St. Paul, MN
November 10, 2024*; 1:00 pm, ESPN+		at Northern Illinois	W 75–68	3–0	21 – Hill	8 – Opichka	9 – Scalia	Convocation Center (1,005); DeKalb, IL
November 14, 2024*; 6:30 pm, ESPN+		at No. 8 Iowa State	L 47–80	3–1	11 – Scalia	7 – Langbehn	2 – Hill	Hilton Coliseum (9,951); Ames, IA
November 16, 2024*; 2:00 pm, ESPN+		at Wichita State	L 64–69	3–2	30 – Langbehn	7 – Langbehn	6 – Scalia	Charles Koch Arena (986); Wichita, KS
November 21, 2024*; 3:00 pm, ESPN+		at Oakland	W 73–62	4–2	22 – Tied	8 – Tied	4 – Opichka	OU Credit Union O'rena (244); Auburn Hills, MI
November 25, 2024*; 7:00 pm, SLN		Macalester	W 84–43	5–2	16 – Hill	7 – Sand	4 – Tied	Schoenecker Arena (323); St. Paul, MN
December 1, 2024*; 12:00 pm, SLN		UIC	W 75–71	6–2	22 – Opichka	7 – Opichka	11 – Hill	Schoenecker Arena (411); St. Paul, MN
December 4, 2024*; 7:00 pm, SLN		Northern Colorado; Big Sky–Summit Challenge	L 54–62	6–3	19 – Tied	6 – Opichka	4 – Hill	Schoenecker Arena (327); St. Paul, MN
December 7, 2024*; 2:00 pm, ESPN+		at Idaho; Big Sky–Summit Challenge	L 54–76	6–4	14 – Lamker	8 – Opichka	3 – Opichka	Memorial Gym (1,199); Moscow, ID
December 14, 2024*; 1:00 pm, SLN		Western Illinois	W 69–56	7–4	26 – Hill	8 – Opichka	5 – Scalia	Schoenecker Arena (421); St. Paul, MN
December 21, 2024*; 1:00 pm, SLN/Fox 9+		Drake	L 81–92	7–5	24 – Hill	5 – Opichka	5 – Opichka	Schoenecker Arena (653); St. Paul, MN
December 28, 2024*; 1:00 pm, ESPN+		at Eastern Michigan	W 81–65	8–5	21 – Scalia	8 – Tied	6 – Hill	George Gervin GameAbove Center (1,127); Ypsilanti, MI
Summit League regular season
January 2, 2025; 2:00 pm, SLN		Kansas City	W 2–0 Forfeit (Note: The game was originally won by Kansas City 76–69. However, on January 7, Kansas City self-reported a rules violation, resulting in a St. Thomas forfeit win. Despite this, the stats from the game will still be counted.)	9–5 (1–0)	23 – Scalia	6 – Langbehn	6 – Hill	Schoenecker Arena (274); St. Paul, MN
January 4, 2025; 1:00 pm, SLN/Fox 9+		North Dakota State	L 59–73	9–6 (1–1)	20 – Langbehn	4 – Tied	7 – Hill	Schoenecker Arena (773); St. Paul, MN
January 9, 2025; 7:00 pm, SLN		at South Dakota	L 60–77	9–7 (1–2)	22 – Scalia	9 – Sand	4 – Hill	Sanford Coyote Sports Center (1,225); Vermillion, SD
January 16, 2025; 7:00 pm, SLN		at Oral Roberts	L 68–71	9–8 (1–3)	15 – Hill	12 – Langbehn	4 – Hill	Mabee Center (1,478); Tulsa, OK
January 18, 2025; 2:00 pm, SLN		at Omaha	W 67–53	10–8 (2–3)	18 – Langbehn	8 – Lamker	4 – Tied	Baxter Arena (416); Omaha, NE
January 22, 2025; 7:00 pm, SLN		South Dakota State	L 76–83	10–9 (2–4)	23 – Scalia	7 – Sand	8 – Scalia	Schoenecker Arena (733); St. Paul, MN
January 25, 2025; 12:00 pm, SLN		Denver	W 78–65	11–9 (3–4)	21 – Scalia	6 – Tied	9 – Hill	Schoenecker Arena (413); St. Paul, MN
January 30, 2025; 7:00 pm, SLN		at North Dakota	W 76–71	12–9 (4–4)	23 – Langbehn	8 – Frentzel	7 – Hill	Betty Engelstad Sioux Center (1,624); Grand Forks, ND
February 1, 2025; 1:00 pm, SLN		at North Dakota State	L 74–81	12–10 (4–5)	26 – Scalia	6 – Opichka	6 – Hill	Scheels Center (895); Fargo, ND
February 5, 2025; 7:00 pm, SLN		Omaha	W 75–62	13–10 (5–5)	20 – Scalia	7 – Opichka	8 – Hill	Schoenecker Arena (309); St. Paul, MN
February 8, 2025; 12:00 pm, SLN		at Denver	W 81–68	14–10 (6–5)	18 – Tied	9 – Langbehn	6 – Scalia	Hamilton Gymnasium (493); Denver, CO
February 12, 2025; 7:00 pm, SLN		North Dakota	W 77–54	15–10 (7–5)	20 – Hill	6 – Langbehn	5 – Tied	Schoenecker Arena (402); St. Paul, MN
February 20, 2025; 1:00 pm, SLN		at Kansas City	L 82–91	15–11 (7–6)	23 – Opichka	6 – Tied	7 – Hill	Swinney Recreation Center (419); Kansas City, MO
February 22, 2025; 1:00 pm, SLN		South Dakota	W 66–57	16–11 (8–6)	22 – Hill	13 – Scalia	6 – Hill	Schoenecker Arena (413); St. Paul, MN
February 26, 2025; 7:00 pm, SLN		Oral Roberts	W 79–76	17–11 (9–6)	28 – Langbehn	7 – Langbehn	4 – Opichka	Schoenecker Arena (314); St. Paul, MN
March 1, 2025; 2:00 pm, SLN		at South Dakota State	L 46–79	17–12 (9–7)	16 – Scalia	6 – Opichka	4 – Scalia	First Bank and Trust Arena (4,082); Brookings, SD
Summit League tournament
March 7, 2025; 12:00 pm, SLN	(4)	vs. (5) North Dakota; Quarterfinals	L 67–80	17–13	26 – Langbehn	10 – Opichka	5 – Hill	Denny Sanford Premier Center; Sioux Falls, SD
*Non-conference game. ^{#}Rankings from AP poll. (#) Tournament seedings in parentheses. All times are in Central.
