= 2024–25 North Dakota State Bison women's basketball team =

College women's basketball season

2024–25 North Dakota State Bison women's basketball

WNIT, Great 8
- Conference: Summit League
- Record: 21–12 (11–5 Summit)
- Head coach: Jory Collins (6th season)
- Associate head coach: Dylan Geissert
- Assistant coaches: Jaime Adams; Michaela Crall
- Home arena: Scheels Center

2024–25 Summit League women's basketball standings
	Conf.				Overall
Team	W		L	PCT	W		L	PCT
No. 24 South Dakota State †	16	–	0	1.000	30	–	4	.882
Oral Roberts	12	–	4	.750	24	–	9	.727
North Dakota State	11	–	5	.688	21	–	12	.636
St. Thomas*	9	–	7	.563	16	–	14	.533
North Dakota	6	–	10	.375	12	–	19	.387
Kansas City	6	–	10	.375	12	–	21	.364
South Dakota	5	–	11	.313	11	–	20	.355
Omaha	5	–	11	.313	14	–	17	.452
Denver	2	–	14	.125	9	–	21	.300
† 2025 Summit League tournament winner * Ineligible for the 2025 NCAA tournament due to transition from Division III; Rankings from AP poll

The 2024–25 North Dakota State Bison women's basketball team represented North Dakota State University during the 2024–25 NCAA Division I women's basketball season. The Bison, who were led by sixth year head coach Jory Collins, played their home games at the Scheels Center, as members of the Summit League.
NDSU made the 2025 Summit League women's basketball tournament as the 3 seed, but fell to Kansas City for second time in three years in the quarterfinal round. They then were awarded an at-large bid to the 2025 Women's National Invitation Tournament, and received a first-round bye for the second season in a row. In the second round, the Bison defeated New Mexico State and advanced to the Super 16 where they would defeat Washington State to advance to the program's first Great 8 berth. However, in the Great 8, they would fall at home to Troy in overtime.

== Previous season ==
The Bison finished the 2023–24 season 22–12, 13–3 in Summit League play to finish in second place. This is currently NDSU's best finish since entering Division I. In the Summit League tournament the Bison defeated Denver and Oral Roberts in the quarterfinals and semifinals to reach their first ever championship game. They fell to South Dakota State in the title game to miss out on a berth to the NCAA tournament. However, they did earn an automatic bid to the 2024 Women's National Invitation Tournament, and even received a first round bye. In their first tournament game, they defeated Montana at home for the program's first postseason win in the Division I era. After that though, they would lose to Minnesota in the Super 16.

== Offseason ==
=== Departures ===
Name	Number	Pos.	Height	Year	Hometown	Reason for departure
Heaven Hamling	11	F	5'8"	Senior	Grand Rapids, MN	Graduated
Elle Evans	21	G	6'3"	Sophomore	Edwardsville, IL	Transferred to Kansas

=== Incoming transfers ===
Name	Number	Pos.	Height	Year	Hometown	Previous school
Molly Lenz	1	G	5'7"	Sophomore	Victoria, MN	Illinois State
Sacia Vanderpool	20	F	6'5"	Senior	Byron, MN	Wisconsin

=== 2024 recruiting class ===
College recruiting information
Name	Hometown	School	Height	Weight	Commit date
Amelia Hobson; G	Parkdale, Australia	Parkdale Secondary College	6 ft 1 in (1.85 m)	N/A	Apr 18, 2024
Amelia Hobson; G	Recruit ratings: Scout: Rivals: 247Sports: ESPN: (0)				
Claire Stern; F	Maple Grove, MN	Maple Grove High School	6 ft 0 in (1.83 m)	N/A	Aug 2, 2022
Claire Stern; F	Recruit ratings: Scout: Rivals: 247Sports: ESPN: (0)				
Marisa Frost; G	Lino Lakes, MN	Centennial High School	5 ft 8 in (1.73 m)	N/A	Aug 2, 2022
Marisa Frost; G	Recruit ratings: Scout: Rivals: 247Sports: ESPN: (0)				
Overall recruit ranking:
Note: In many cases, Scout, Rivals, 247Sports, On3, and ESPN may conflict in their listings of height and weight.; In these cases, the average was taken. ESPN grades are on a 100-point scale.; Sources: "2024 Team Ranking". Rivals.

== Roster ==
2024–25 North Dakota State Bison women's basketball team
Players
Coaches

Pos.	#	Name	Height	Year	Hometown
G	1	Molly Lenz	5 ft 7 in (1.7 m)	So	Victoria, MN
F	2	Abbie Draper	6 ft 2 in (1.88 m)	Sr	Waverly, IA
G	8	Amelia Hobson	6 ft 1 in (1.85 m)	Fr	Parkdale, AUS
G	10	Abby Graham	5 ft 10 in (1.78 m)	Jr	Portland, OR
F	11	Claire Stern	6 ft 0 in (1.83 m)	Fr	Maple Grove, MN
G	12	Marisa Frost	5 ft 8 in (1.73 m)	Fr	Lino Lakes, MN
F	15	Karrington Asp	6 ft 2 in (1.88 m)	Fr	Epworth, IA
F	20	Sacia Vanderpool	6 ft 5 in (1.96 m)	Sr	Byron, MN
F	22	Avery Koenen	6 ft 2 in (1.88 m)	So	Montevideo, MN
G	24	Abby Schulte	5 ft 10 in (1.78 m)	Sr	Maple Grove, MN
F	32	Miriley Simon	6 ft 1 in (1.85 m)	So	West Fargo, ND
G	40	Abby Krzewinski	5 ft 11 in (1.8 m)	So	Wayzata, MN

Head coach

- Jory Collins (Emporia State)

Assistant coach(es)

- Dylan Geissert (Emporia State)
- Jaime Adams (North Dakota State)
- Michaela Everett (Wisconsin)

Legend

- (C) Team captain
- (S) Suspended
- (I) Ineligible
- (W) Walk-on
- Injured
- Current redshirt

Roster
Last update: March 26, 2025

== Schedule and results ==
Date time, TV	Rank^{#}	Opponent^{#}	Result	Record	High points	High rebounds	High assists	Site (attendance) city, state
Non-conference regular season
November 4, 2024; 11:00 am, WDAY Xtra/Summit League Network		Drake	L 78–84	0–1	13 – Koenen	9 – Koenen	4 – Graham	Scheels Center (1,073); Fargo, ND
November 10, 2024; 2:00 pm, WDAY Xtra/SLN		Eastern Illinois	W 65–56	1–1	15 – Koenen	11 – Koenen	3 – Koenen	Scheels Center (752); Fargo, ND
November 15, 2024; 7:00 pm, WDAY Xtra/SLN		Jamestown	W 88–50	2–1	15 – Krzewinski	7 – Simon	4 – Lenz	Scheels Center (785); Fargo, ND
November 22, 2024; 8:15 pm, YouTube		vs. Vermont; ASRC/ConocoPhillips Great Alaska Shootout	W 58–50	3–1	15 – Lenz	7 – Koenen	4 – Lenz	Alaska Airlines Center (550); Anchorage, AK
November 23, 2024; 11:30 pm, YouTube		vs. Troy; ASRC/ConocoPhillips Great Alaska Shootout	L 69–86	3–2	15 – Koenen	10 – Koenen	4 – Tied	Alaska Airlines Center (1,001); Anchorage, AK
November 29, 2024; 5:00 pm, ESPN+		at Charleston Southern	L 60–67	3–3	11 – Schulte	7 – Simon	3 – Lenz	Buccaneer Field House (225); Charleston, SC
December 1, 2024; 11:00 am, FloSports		at Charleston	W 72–59	4–3	17 – Lenz	13 – Draper	5 – Frost	TD Arena (422); Charleston, SC
December 4, 2024; 7:00 pm, WDAY Xtra/SLN		Montana; Big Sky–Summit Challenge	W 83–74	5–3	27 – Frost	7 – Koenen	3 – Tied	Scheels Center (624); Fargo, ND
December 7, 2024; 4:00 pm, ESPN+		at Eastern Washington; Big Sky–Summit Challenge	W 74–47	6–3	14 – Koenen	6 – Simon	4 – Draper	Reese Court (536); Cheney, WA
December 10, 2024; 4:00 pm, ESPN+		at Tulane	L 61–67	6–4	16 – Frost	8 – Draper	3 – Tied	Devlin Fieldhouse (1,076); New Orleans, LA
December 18, 2024; 4:00 pm		at Washington; Husky Classic	L 51–64	6–5	13 – Draper	12 – Koenen	2 – Draper	Alaska Airlines Arena (1,738); Seattle, WA
December 19, 2024; 2:00 pm		vs. Boise State; Husky Classic	W 70–66	7–5	15 – Draper	7 – Lenz	3 – Schulte	Alaska Airlines Arena; Seattle, WA
December 29, 2024; 1:00 pm, WDAY Xtra/SLN		Dakota Wesleyan	W 64–55	8–5	13 – Krzewinski	8 – Tied	4 – Tied	Scheels Center (835); Fargo, ND
Summit League regular season
January 4, 2025; 1:00 pm, SLN		at St. Thomas	W 73–59	9–5 (1–0)	13 – Koenen	11 – Koenen	5 – Schulte	Schoenecker Arena (773); St. Paul, MN
January 9, 2025; 7:00 pm, WDAY Xtra/SLN		Denver	W 69–59	10–5 (2–0)	14 – Koenen	5 – Koenen	3 – Graham	Scheels Center (570); Fargo, ND
January 11, 2025; 12:00 pm, WDAY Xtra/SLN		Oral Roberts	W 79–69	11–5 (3–0)	22 – Koenen	10 – Koenen	4 – Schulte	Scheels Center (745); Fargo, ND
January 16, 2025; 7:00 pm, SLN		at Omaha	W 81–67	12–5 (4–0)	23 – Frost	8 – Draper	3 – Tied	Baxter Arena (693); Omaha, NE
January 18, 2025; 2:00 pm, SLN		at Kansas City	L 51–56	12–6 (4–1)	11 – Krzewinski	10 – Draper	5 – Koenen	Swinney Recreation Center (313); Kansas City, MO
January 22, 2025; 7:00 pm, SLN		at South Dakota	W 72–53	13–6 (5–1)	29 – Draper	12 – Draper	3 – Koenen	Sanford Coyote Sports Center (1,442); Vermillion, SD
January 25, 2025; 1:00 pm, WDAY Xtra/SLN		North Dakota	W 70–66	14–6 (6–1)	21 – Koenen	9 – Draper	3 – Tied	Scheels Center (2,210); Fargo, ND
January 29, 2025; 7:00 pm, SLN		at South Dakota State	L 55–63	14–7 (6–2)	14 – Schulte	8 – Draper	5 – Frost	First Bank and Trust Arena (4,156); Brookings, SD
February 1, 2025; 1:00 pm, WDAY Xtra/SLN		St. Thomas	W 81–74	15–7 (7–2)	22 – Koenen	7 – Koenen	5 – Schulte	Scheels Center (895); Fargo, ND
February 8, 2025; 1:00 pm, WDAY Xtra/SLN		South Dakota	W 75–65	16–7 (8–2)	25 – Koenen	7 – Stern	3 – Simon	Scheels Center (1,037); Fargo, ND
February 12, 2025; 7:00 pm, WDAY Xtra/SLN		South Dakota State	L 53–68	16–8 (8–3)	13 – Koenen	11 – Koenen	3 – Frost	Scheels Center (1,158); Fargo, ND
February 15, 2025; 7:00 pm, SLN		at North Dakota	L 60–65	16–9 (8–4)	29 – Koenen	14 – Koenen	4 – Stern	Betty Engelstad Sioux Center (1,964); Grand Forks, ND
February 20, 2025; 7:00 pm, SLN		at Denver	W 64–59	17–9 (9–4)	28 – Draper	14 – Draper	3 – Simon	Hamilton Gymnasium (357); Denver, CO
February 22, 2025; 2:00 pm, SLN		at Oral Roberts	L 84–100	17–10 (9–5)	20 – Koenen	12 – Koenen	2 – Tied	Mabee Center (1,114); Tulsa, OK
February 27, 2025; 7:00 pm, WDAY Xtra/SLN		Kansas City	W 93–67	18–10 (10–5)	20 – Koenen	9 – Koenen	4 – Koenen	Scheels Center (685); Fargo, ND
March 1, 2025; 1:00 pm, WDAY Xtra/SLN		Omaha	W 76–59	19–10 (11–5)	30 – Koenen	14 – Koenen	3 – Koenen	Scheels Center (1,059); Fargo, ND
Summit League tournament
March 7, 2025*; 2:30 pm, SLN	(3)	vs. (6) Kansas City; Quarterfinals	L 58–68	19–11	14 – Lenz	9 – Stern	3 – Tied	Denny Sanford Premier Center (4,825); Sioux Falls, SD
Women's National Invitation Tournament (WNIT)
March 24, 2025*; 7:00 pm, WDAY Xtra		New Mexico State; Second Round	W 68–65	20–11	17 – Koenen	12 – Koenen	3 – Schulte	Scheels Center (1,016); Fargo, ND
March 27, 2025*; 7:00 pm, WDAY Xtra		Washington State; Super 16	W 59–51	21–11	21 – Koenen	8 – Tied	3 – Tied	Scheels Center (1,239); Fargo, ND
March 31, 2025*; 7:00 pm, WDAY Xtra		Troy; Great 8	L 88–97 ^{OT}	21–12	23 – Koenen	14 – Koenen	5 – Tied	Scheels Center (2,462); Fargo, ND
*Non-conference game. ^{#}Rankings from AP Poll. (#) Tournament seedings in parentheses. All times are in Central.

== Awards and accolades ==
=== Summit League Player of the Week ===
Week	Player(s) of the Week	School
Dec. 9	Marisa Frost	North Dakota State
Jan. 27	Abbie Draper	North Dakota State (2)
Mar. 3	Avery Koenen	North Dakota State (3)

=== Summit League Regular Season Awards ===
==== All–Summit League First Team ====
- Avery Koenen

==== All–Summit League Second Team ====
- Abbie Draper

==== All–Newcomer Team ====
- Molly Lenz

==== All–Freshman Team ====
- Marisa Frost
