= 2025 Summit League women's basketball tournament =

American college basketball postseason tournament

- Classification: Division I
- Season: 2024–25
- Teams: 9
- Site: Denny Sanford Premier Center; Sioux Falls, South Dakota
- Champions: South Dakota State (12th title)
- Winning coach: Aaron Johnston (12th title)
- MVP: Paige Meyer (South Dakota State)
- Attendance: 32,458 (overall); 8,417 (championship)
- Television: Summit League Network, CBSSN

2024–25 Summit League women's basketball standings
	Conf.				Overall
Team	W		L	PCT	W		L	PCT
No. 24 South Dakota State †	16	–	0	1.000	30	–	4	.882
Oral Roberts	12	–	4	.750	24	–	9	.727
North Dakota State	11	–	5	.688	21	–	12	.636
St. Thomas*	9	–	7	.563	16	–	14	.533
North Dakota	6	–	10	.375	12	–	19	.387
Kansas City	6	–	10	.375	12	–	21	.364
South Dakota	5	–	11	.313	11	–	20	.355
Omaha	5	–	11	.313	14	–	17	.452
Denver	2	–	14	.125	9	–	21	.300
† 2025 Summit League tournament winner * Ineligible for the 2025 NCAA tournament due to transition from Division III; Rankings from AP poll

The 2025 Summit League women's basketball tournament was the postseason women's college basketball tournament for the Summit League for the 2024–25 season. All tournament games were played at the Denny Sanford Premier Center in Sioux Falls, South Dakota, from March 5–9, 2025.

== Seeds ==
All nine conference teams participated in the tournament. Teams were seeded by conference record. If teams were tied at the conclusion of conference play, the following tiebreakers were used in this order:

1. Head-to-head record
2. Record against the highest-seeded team not involved in the tie, going down through the standings until the tie is broken

If St. Thomas were to win the tournament (since the Tommies are ineligible for the NCAA tournament until 2026), the NCAA tournament berth would go to the highest seeded team that is eligible for postseason play which would be South Dakota State.

Seed	School	Conf. record	Tiebreaker(s)
1	South Dakota State	16–0	
2	Oral Roberts	12–4	
3	North Dakota State	11–5	
4	St. Thomas	9–7	
5	North Dakota	6–10	2–0 vs. Kansas City
6	Kansas City	6–10	0–2 vs. North Dakota
7	South Dakota	5–11	1–1 vs. St. Thomas
8	Omaha	5–11	0–2 vs. St. Thomas
9	Denver	2–14	

== Schedule and results ==
Game	Time	Matchup	Score	Attendance	Television
First Round – Wednesday, March 5
1	4:30 pm	No. 8 Omaha vs. No. 9 Denver	76–68	3,917	MidcoSN/Summit League Network
Quarterfinals – Thursday, March 6
2	12:00 pm	No. 2 Oral Roberts vs. No. 7 South Dakota	70–50	7,195	MidcoSN/Summit League Network
3	2:30 pm	No. 1 South Dakota State vs. No. 8 Omaha	87–67	7,195	MidcoSN/Summit League Network
Quarterfinals – Friday, March 7
4	12:00 pm	No. 4 St. Thomas vs. No. 5 North Dakota	67–80	4,825	MidcoSN/Summit League Network
5	2:30 pm	No. 3 North Dakota State vs. No. 6 Kansas City	58–68	4,825	MidcoSN/Summit League Network
Semifinals – Saturday, March 8
6	12:00 pm	No. 1 South Dakota State vs. No. 5 North Dakota	84–55	8,104	MidcoSN/Summit League Network
7	2:30 pm	No. 2 Oral Roberts vs. No. 6 Kansas City	95–73	8,104	MidcoSN/Summit League Network
Final – Sunday, March 9
8	3:00 pm	No. 1 South Dakota State vs. No. 2 Oral Roberts	84–68	8,417	CBSSN
*Game times in CST through the semifinals and CDT for the championship. Rankings denote tournament seed. Reference:

== Bracket ==
First Round; March 5 Summit League Network
8	Omaha	76
9	Denver	68

Quarterfinals; March 6 & 7 Summit League Network
1	South Dakota State	87
8	Omaha	67
4	St. Thomas	67
5	North Dakota	80
2	Oral Roberts	70
7	South Dakota	50
3	North Dakota State	58
6	Kansas City	68

Semifinals; March 8 Summit League Network
1	South Dakota State	84
5	North Dakota	55
2	Oral Roberts	95
6	Kansas City	73

Championship; March 9 CBS Sports Network
1	South Dakota State	84
2	Oral Roberts	68

== All-Tournament Team ==
The following players were named to the All-Tournament Team:

Player	School
Paige Meyer (MVP)	South Dakota State
Brooklyn Meyer	South Dakota State
Haleigh Timmer	South Dakota State
Emily Robinson	Oral Roberts
Taleyah Jones	Oral Roberts

== See also ==
- 2025 Summit League men's basketball tournament
