= 2024–25 Oral Roberts Golden Eagles women's basketball team =

Women's basketball season

2024–25 Oral Roberts Golden Eagles women's basketball

WBIT First Round
- Conference: Summit League
- Record: 24–9 (12–4 Summit)
- Head coach: Kelsi Musick (3rd season)
- Assistant coaches: Cophie Anderson; Bill Annan; Hayden Priddy
- Home arena: Mabee Center

2024–25 Summit League women's basketball standings
	Conf.				Overall
Team	W		L	PCT	W		L	PCT
No. 24 South Dakota State †	16	–	0	1.000	30	–	4	.882
Oral Roberts	12	–	4	.750	24	–	9	.727
North Dakota State	11	–	5	.688	21	–	12	.636
St. Thomas*	9	–	7	.563	16	–	14	.533
North Dakota	6	–	10	.375	12	–	19	.387
Kansas City	6	–	10	.375	12	–	21	.364
South Dakota	5	–	11	.313	11	–	20	.355
Omaha	5	–	11	.313	14	–	17	.452
Denver	2	–	14	.125	9	–	21	.300
† 2025 Summit League tournament winner * Ineligible for the 2025 NCAA tournament due to transition from Division III; Rankings from AP poll

The 2024–25 Oral Roberts Golden Eagles women's basketball team represented Oral Roberts University in the 2024–25 NCAA Division I women's basketball season. The Golden Eagles, who were led by third-year head coach Kelsi Musick, compete in the Summit League. They played home games at the Mabee Center in Tulsa, Oklahoma.

== Previous season ==
The Golden Eagles finished the 2023–24 season 21–11, 11–5 in Summit League play, to finish in third place. Oral Roberts entered the Summit League tournament as the number three seed, and they defeated North Dakota in the quarterfinals before falling to North Dakota State in the semifinals. The Golden Eagles obtained an at-large bid to the 2024 Women's National Invitation Tournament, and hosted a first-round game. They fell to Grambling State in that first-round game.

== Roster ==
2024–25 Oral Roberts Golden Eagles women's basketball team
Players
Coaches

Pos.	#	Name	Height	Year	Previous school	Hometown
G	1	Annyka Hellendrung	5 ft 9 in (1.75 m)	So	Waukesha West High School	Waukesha, WI
G	2	Gentry Baldwin	5 ft 5 in (1.65 m)	So	Bixby High School	Bixby, OK
G	3	Alayna Kraus	5 ft 8 in (1.73 m)	Fr	Okawville High School	Okawville, IL
G/F	5	Alana Shetlar	6 ft 3 in (1.91 m)	Fr	Andover High School	Andover, KS
G	10	Taleyah Jones	5 ft 10 in (1.78 m)	Jr	UT Arlington	Broken Arrow, OK
G	11	Jalei Ogelsby	5 ft 8 in (1.73 m)	RS Jr	Arkansas Tech	Howe, OK
G	15	Azailah Funches	6 ft 1 in (1.85 m)	Fr	Shawnee Mission South High School	Leawood, KS
G	20	Meghan Weinrich	5 ft 10 in (1.78 m)	Sr	Butte College	Willows, CA
G	22	Ruthie Udoumoh	6 ft 1 in (1.85 m)	GS	Oklahoma State	Broken Arrow, OK
F	23	Emily Robinson	5 ft 10 in (1.78 m)	So	Caddo High School	Bokchito, OK
G/F	33	Tyla Heard	5 ft 11 in (1.8 m)	Fr	Sapulpa High School	Sapulpa, OK
F	34	Makyra Tramble	5 ft 10 in (1.78 m)	GS	Oklahoma State	Shawnee, OK
C	42	Mary Carden	6 ft 6 in (1.98 m)	Fr	Idabel High School	Idabel, OK

Head coach

- Kelsi Musick (Cameron)

Assistant coach(es)

- Cophie Anderson (Fresno State)
- Bill Annan (Kansas State)
- Hayden Priddy (Southwestern Oklahoma State)

Legend

- (C) Team captain
- (S) Suspended
- (I) Ineligible
- (W) Walk-on
- Injured
- Current redshirt

Roster
Last update: October 22, 2024

== Schedule and results ==
Date time, TV	Rank^{#}	Opponent^{#}	Result	Record	High points	High rebounds	High assists	Site (attendance) city, state
Exhibition
October 29, 2024*; 7:00 p.m.		Rogers State	W 104–51	–	–	–	–	Mabee Center; Tulsa, OK
Non-conference regular season
November 4, 2024*; 11:00 a.m., Summit League Network		Northeastern State	W 99–74	1–0	26 – Jones	7 – Oglesby	4 – Robinson	Mabee Center (4,836); Tulsa, OK
November 7, 2024*; 6:30 p.m., ESPN+		at Oklahoma State	L 68–89	1–1	18 – Udoumoh	8 – Udoumoh	3 – Robinson	Gallagher-Iba Arena (1,991); Stillwater, OK
November 11, 2024*; 7:00 p.m., SLN		UTRGV	W 65–58	2–1	18 – Oglesby	14 – Udoumoh	3 – Robinson	Mabee Center (1,817); Tulsa, OK
November 17, 2024*; 2:00 p.m., ESPN+		at Tulsa	W 67–56	3–1	19 – Udoumoh	16 – Udoumoh	3 – Tied	Reynolds Center (1,880); Tulsa, OK
November 21, 2024*; 6:00 p.m., SECN+		at Arkansas	W 94–73	4–1	23 – Jones	13 – Udoumoh	5 – Robinson	Bud Walton Arena (2,277); Fayetteville, AR
November 25, 2024*; 5:00 p.m., SLN		Lindenwood	W 99–79	5–1	21 – Tied	7 – Robinson	6 – Tramble	Mabee Center; Tulsa, OK
December 4, 2024*; 12:00 p.m., ESPN+		at Northern Arizona; Big Sky–Summit Challenge	L 80–87	5–2	26 – Jones	8 – Udoumoh	5 – Robinson	Walkup Skydome (902); Flagstaff, AZ
December 7, 2024*; 5:00 p.m., GEB/SLN		Montana State; Big Sky–Summit Challenge	W 82–80 ^{OT}	6–2	22 – Tied	11 – Udoumoh	5 – Oglesby	Mabee Center (2,111); Tulsa, OK
December 13, 2024*; 7:00 p.m., SLN		Oklahoma City	W 99–55	7–2	29 – Oglesby	10 – Udoumoh	7 – Robinson	Mabee Center (1,776); Tulsa, OK
December 15, 2024*; 1:30 p.m., SECN+		at No. 10 Oklahoma	L 54–94	7–3	15 – Udoumoh	5 – Jones	3 – Tramble	Lloyd Noble Center (3,460); Norman, OK
December 18, 2024*; 6:30 p.m., SECN+		at Missouri	W 76–63	8–3	24 – Tramble	10 – Robinson	8 – Robinson	Mizzou Arena (3,194); Columbia, MO
December 21, 2024*; 2:00 p.m., SLN		Wichita State	W 77–65	9–3	19 – Tied	9 – Udoumoh	4 – Tied	Mabee Center (2,727); Tulsa, OK
December 28, 2024*; 2:00 p.m., SLN		Haskell	W 124–47	10–3	22 – Oglesby	8 – Heard	7 – Heard	Mabee Center (2,017); Tulsa, OK
Summit League regular season
January 2, 2025; 7:00 p.m., SLN		South Dakota State	L 76–81	10–4 (0–1)	28 – Jones	9 – Udoumoh	2 – Tied	Mabee Center (2,891); Tulsa, OK
January 4, 2025; 2:00 p.m., SLN		South Dakota	W 82–70	11–4 (1–1)	20 – Jones	11 – Udoumoh	4 – Tied	Mabee Center (1,633); Tulsa, OK
January 9, 2025; 7:00 p.m., SLN		at North Dakota	W 98–91 ^{2OT}	12–4 (2–1)	29 – Jones	8 – Tied	9 – Tramble	Betty Engelstad Sioux Center (1,489); Grand Forks, ND
January 11, 2025; 12:00 p.m., SLN		at North Dakota State	L 69–79	12–5 (2–2)	26 – Jones	8 – Tied	2 – Robinson	Scheels Center (745); Fargo, ND
January 16, 2025; 7:00 p.m., SLN		St. Thomas	W 71–68	13–5 (3–2)	21 – Oglesby	12 – Udoumoh	2 – Tied	Mabee Center (1,479); Tulsa, OK
January 18, 2025; 1:00 p.m., SLN		at Denver	W 79–72	14–5 (4–2)	17 – Tramble	8 – Jones	6 – Robinson	Hamilton Gymnasium (450); Denver, CO
January 22, 2025; 7:00 p.m., SLN		at Kansas City	W 74–61	15–5 (5–2)	21 – Jones	9 – Oglesby	4 – Jones	Swinney Recreation Center (372); Kansas City, MO
January 29, 2025; 7:00 p.m., SLN		Omaha	W 95–57	16–5 (6–2)	26 – Oglesby	8 – Udoumoh	8 – Tramble	Mabee Center (1,588); Tulsa, OK
February 1, 2025; 1:00 p.m., SLN		Denver	W 68–67	17–5 (7–2)	14 – Tramble	8 – Tied	3 – Tied	Mabee Center (1,191); Tulsa, OK
February 5, 2025; 7:00 p.m., SLN		at South Dakota	W 88–62	18–5 (8–2)	23 – Oglesby	8 – Weinrich	5 – Weinrich	Sanford Coyote Sports Center (1,349); Vermillion, SD
February 8, 2025; 11:00 a.m., CBSSN		at South Dakota State	L 71–89	18–6 (8–3)	21 – Tied	7 – Oglesby	4 – Jones	First Bank and Trust Arena (2,631); Brookings, SD
February 13, 2025; 7:00 p.m., SLN		at Omaha	W 105–74	19–6 (9–3)	30 – Jones	9 – Udoumoh	6 – Robinson	Baxter Arena (410); Omaha, NE
February 15, 2025; 2:00 p.m., SLN		Kansas City	W 109–88	20–6 (10–3)	28 – Jones	8 – Udoumoh	7 – Tramble	Mabee Center (1,311); Tulsa, OK
February 20, 2025; 7:00 p.m., SLN		North Dakota	W 83–80	21–6 (11–3)	23 – Robinson	7 – Jones	2 – Tied	Mabee Center (1,519); Tulsa, OK
February 22, 2025; 12:00 p.m., SLN		North Dakota State	W 100–84	22–6 (12–3)	28 – Tied	7 – Weinrich	7 – Tramble	Mabee Center (1,114); Tulsa, OK
February 26, 2025; 7:00 p.m., SLN		at St. Thomas	L 76–79	22–7 (12–4)	25 – Jones	11 – Udoumoh	7 – Robinson	Shoenecker Arena (314); St. Paul, MN
Summit League tournament
March 6, 2025; 12:00 p.m., SLN	(2)	vs. (7) South Dakota; Quarterfinals	W 70–50	23–7	18 – Oglesby	10 – Weinrich	4 – Tramble	Denny Sanford Premier Center; Sioux Falls, SD
March 8, 2025; 12:00 p.m., SLN	(2)	vs. (6) Kansas City; Semifinals	W 95–73	24–7	20 – Udoumoh	15 – Udoumoh	5 – Robinson	Denny Sanford Premier Center (8,104); Sioux Falls, SD
March 9, 2025; 3:00 p.m., CBSSN	(2)	vs. (1) No. 25 South Dakota State; Championship	L 68–84	24–8	17 – Tied	8 – Udoumoh	6 – Robinson	Denny Sanford Premier Center; Sioux Falls, SD
Women's Basketball Invitation Tournament (WBIT)
March 20, 2025; 6:30 p.m., ESPN+		at (3) Missouri State; First Round	L 76–107	24–9	18 – Oglesby	8 – Tied	2 – Tied	Great Southern Bank Arena (2,032); Springfield, MO
*Non-conference game. ^{#}Rankings from AP poll. (#) Tournament seedings in parentheses. All times are in Central.
