= 2024–25 Denver Pioneers women's basketball team =

American college basketball season

2024–25 Denver Pioneers women's basketball
- Conference: Summit League
- Record: 9–21 (2–14 Summit)
- Head coach: Doshia Woods (5th season)
- Associate head coach: Lindsay Werntz
- Assistant coaches: Sarah Miles; Marquelle Dent
- Home arena: Hamilton Gymnasium

2024–25 Summit League women's basketball standings
	Conf.				Overall
Team	W		L	PCT	W		L	PCT
No. 24 South Dakota State †	16	–	0	1.000	30	–	4	.882
Oral Roberts	12	–	4	.750	24	–	9	.727
North Dakota State	11	–	5	.688	21	–	12	.636
St. Thomas*	9	–	7	.563	16	–	14	.533
North Dakota	6	–	10	.375	12	–	19	.387
Kansas City	6	–	10	.375	12	–	21	.364
South Dakota	5	–	11	.313	11	–	20	.355
Omaha	5	–	11	.313	14	–	17	.452
Denver	2	–	14	.125	9	–	21	.300
† 2025 Summit League tournament winner * Ineligible for the 2025 NCAA tournament due to transition from Division III; Rankings from AP poll

The 2024–25 Denver Pioneers women's basketball team represented the University of Denver during the 2024–25 NCAA Division I women's basketball season. The Pioneers, who were led by fifth-year head coach Doshia Woods, played their home games at Hamilton Gymnasium in Denver, Colorado as members of the Summit League.

The Pioneers finished the season 9–21, 2–14 in Summit League play, to finish in ninth (last) place. They lost in the first round of the Summit League tournament to Omaha.

== Previous season ==
The Pioneers finished the 2023–24 season 8–22, 5–11 in Summit League play, to finish in a tie for sixth place. They were defeated by North Dakota State in the quarterfinals of the Summit League tournament.

== Preseason ==
On October 8, 2024, the Summit League released their preseason coaches poll. Denver was picked to finish sixth in the Summit League regular season.

=== Preseason rankings ===
Summit League preseason poll
Predicted finish	Team	Votes (1st place)
1	South Dakota State	562 (34)
2	Oral Roberts	479 (1)
3	North Dakota State	427 (1)
4	South Dakota	363
5	St. Thomas	336
6	Denver	220
7	North Dakota	188
8	Kansas City	144
9	Omaha	116

=== Preseason All-Summit League ===
Preseason All-Summit League teams
Team	Player	Position	Year
1st	Jordan Jones	Guard	Junior

== Roster ==
2024–25 Denver Pioneers women's basketball team
Players
Coaches

Pos.	#	Name	Height	Year	Previous school	Hometown
F	0	Brooke Murrell	6 ft 3 in (1.91 m)	RS Fr	Hawaii	Aurora, CO
F	1	Laila McLeod	6 ft 0 in (1.83 m)	Jr	Grand Canyon	Dallas, TX
G	2	Angelina Robles	5 ft 5 in (1.65 m)	Jr	The Bishop's School	San Diego, CA
G	3	Emma Smith	5 ft 7 in (1.7 m)	Jr	Vestavia Hills High School	Vestavia Hills, AL
G	4	Jordan Jones	6 ft 0 in (1.83 m)	Jr	Cheyenne East High School	Cheyenne, WY
C	5	Anna Rosenberger	6 ft 3 in (1.91 m)	Fr	Glenbrook South High School	Glenview, IL
G/F	7	Brittney-Shania Etuka	6 ft 1 in (1.85 m)	GS	Wagner	Brampton, ON
G	10	Coryn Watts	5 ft 7 in (1.7 m)	Fr	Regis Jesuit High School	Aurora, CO
G/F	11	Emily Counsel	6 ft 3 in (1.91 m)	GS	Willetton Senior High School	Perth, Australia
G	12	Laia Monclova	6 ft 1 in (1.85 m)	So	La Salle	Mallorca, Spain
G	15	Alaisha Brown	5 ft 10 in (1.78 m)	So	James Bowie High School	Arlington, TX
G	22	Macy Hanzlick	5 ft 10 in (1.78 m)	Jr	Pratt Community College	Hoisington, KS
G/F	24	Iman Addison	6 ft 0 in (1.83 m)	Jr	Stanislaus State	San Jose, CA
C	32	Lily Esparza	6 ft 2 in (1.88 m)	Fr	Boylan Catholic High School	Rockford, IL
G	33	Mary Wilson	5 ft 10 in (1.78 m)	Sr	Center Grove High School	Greenwood, IN

Head coach

- Doshia Woods (Western Illinois)

Assistant coach(es)

- Lindsay Werntz (Purdue Fort Wayne)
- Sarah Miles (West Virginia)
- Marquelle Dent (Wyoming)

Legend

- (C) Team captain
- (S) Suspended
- (I) Ineligible
- (W) Walk-on
- Injured
- Current redshirt

Roster
Last update: March 6, 2025

== Schedule and results ==
Date time, TV	Rank^{#}	Opponent^{#}	Result	Record	High points	High rebounds	High assists	Site (attendance) city, state
Non-conference regular season
November 4, 2024*; 6:00 p.m., SLN		Colorado Christian	L 66–73	0–1	24 – Jones	8 – Jones	3 – Robles	Hamilton Gymnasium (328); Denver, CO
November 9, 2024*; 2:00 p.m., ESPN+		at Saint Mary's	L 64–69	0–2	19 – 2 tied	6 – Jones	4 – 2 tied	University Credit Union Pavilion (425); Moraga, CA
November 17, 2024*; 10:00 a.m., ESPN+		at High Point	L 55–63	0–3	20 – Jones	8 – Jones	3 – Jones	Qubein Center (783); High Point, NC
November 22, 2024*; 1:00 p.m., SLN		Christian Brothers	W 78–48	1–3	15 – Jones	10 – 2 tied	6 – Smith	Hamilton Gymnasium (301); Denver, CO
November 24, 2024*; 1:00 p.m., SLN		UC San Diego	W 67–59 ^{OT}	2–3	28 – Jones	13 – Jones	8 – Smith	Hamilton Gymnasium (413); Denver, CO
November 30, 2024*; 1:00 p.m., SLN		UC Irvine	W 60–50	3–3	18 – Jones	7 – Jones	5 – Jones	Hamilton Gymnasium (339); Denver, CO
December 4, 2024*; 7:00 p.m., ESPN+		at Idaho State; Big Sky–Summit Challenge	L 61–73	3–4	15 – Wilson	8 – Jones	2 – Jones	Reed Gym (687); Pocatello, ID
December 7, 2024*; 1:00 p.m., SLN		Portland State; Big Sky–Summit Challenge	W 57–41	4–4	23 – Jones	10 – Smith	7 – Smith	Hamilton Gymnasium (947); Denver, CO
December 10, 2024*; 7:00 p.m., ESPN+		at Colorado	L 61–78	4–5	15 – Jones	6 – 2 tied	5 – Jones	CU Events Center (2,036); Boulder, CO
December 13, 2024*; 6:00 p.m., Altitude 2/SLN		Northern Colorado	W 64–53	5–5	22 – Jones	7 – Jones	6 – Jones	Hamilton Gymnasium (318); Denver, CO
December 15, 2024*; 1:00 p.m., SLN		Texas State	L 60–63	5–6	22 – Jones	7 – Smith	4 – Smith	Hamilton Gymnasium (259); Denver, CO
December 18, 2024*; 6:00 p.m., SLN		Western Colorado	W 64–58	6–6	27 – Jones	10 – Jones	8 – Smith	Hamilton Gymnasium (392); Denver, CO
December 21, 2024*; 12:00 p.m., Altitude/SLN		North Alabama	W 78–70	7–6	19 – Watts	6 – 2 tied	8 – Jones	Hamilton Gymnasium (217); Denver, CO
Summit League regular season
January 2, 2025; 6:00 p.m., SLN		South Dakota	L 71–77	7–7 (0–1)	27 – Jones	6 – 2 tied	7 – Smith	Hamilton Gymnasium (390); Denver, CO
January 4, 2025; 1:00 p.m., SLN		South Dakota State	L 42–79	7–8 (0–2)	13 – Jones	5 – Jones	4 – Jones	Hamilton Gymnasium (553); Denver, CO
January 9, 2025; 6:00 p.m., SLN		at North Dakota State	L 59–69	7–9 (0–3)	23 – Jones	4 – Monclova	5 – Jones	Scheels Center (570); Fargo, ND
January 11, 2025; 12:00 p.m., SLN		at North Dakota	L 61–69	7–10 (0–4)	30 – Jones	7 – Jones	2 – Jones	Betty Engelstad Sioux Center (1,673); Grand Forks, ND
January 15, 2025; 6:00 p.m., SLN		at Kansas City	L 66–73 ^{OT}	7–11 (0–5)	24 – Jones	11 – Murrell	2 – 2 tied	Swinney Recreation Center (392); Kansas City, MO
January 18, 2025; 3:00 p.m., SLN		Oral Roberts	L 72–79	7–12 (0–6)	21 – 2 tied	7 – 2 tied	7 – Smith	Hamilton Gymnasium (450); Denver, CO
January 22, 2025; 6:00 p.m., SLN		Omaha	W 71–56	8–12 (1–6)	24 – Jones	9 – Jones	3 – 2 tied	Hamilton Gymnasium (283); Denver, CO
January 25, 2025; 11:00 a.m., SLN		at St. Thomas	L 65–78	8–13 (1–7)	30 – Jones	4 – 2 tied	4 – Smith	Schoenecker Arena (413); St. Paul, MN
February 1, 2025; 12:00 p.m., SLN		at Oral Roberts	L 67–68	8–14 (1–8)	15 – Jones	11 – Murrell	9 – Smith	Mabee Center (1,191); Tulsa, OK
February 5, 2025; 6:00 p.m., SLN		Kansas City	L 65–73	8–15 (1–9)	23 – Robles	6 – Jones	4 – 2 tied	Hamilton Gymnasium (351); Denver, CO
February 8, 2025; 11:00 a.m., SLN		St. Thomas	L 68–81	8–16 (1–10)	22 – Jones	6 – Jones	3 – Smith	Hamilton Gymnasium (493); Denver, CO
February 15, 2025; 1:00 p.m., SLN		at Omaha	L 77–80 ^{OT}	8–17 (1–11)	20 – Watts	9 – Murrell	5 – Jones	Baxter Arena (470); Omaha, NE
February 20, 2025; 6:00 p.m., SLN		North Dakota State	L 59–64	8–18 (1–12)	16 – Jones	7 – Smith	5 – Smith	Hamilton Gymnasium (357); Denver, CO
February 22, 2025; 1:00 p.m., SLN		North Dakota	L 68–73	8–19 (1–13)	21 – Robles	9 – Murrell	3 – Smith	Hamilton Gymnasium (465); Denver, CO
February 27, 2025; 6:00 p.m., SLN		at South Dakota State	L 37–71	8–20 (1–14)	13 – Jones	6 – Jones	3 – Watts	First Bank and Trust Arena (2,784); Brookings, SD
March 1, 2025; 12:00 p.m., SLN		at South Dakota	W 63–60	9–20 (2–14)	26 – Jones	7 – 2 tied	4 – Smith	Sanford Coyote Sports Center (2,429); Vermillion, SD
Summit League tournament
March 5, 2025; 4:30 p.m., SLN	(9)	vs. (8) Omaha; First round	L 68–76	9–21	22 – Jones	8 – Murrell	3 – Jones	Denny Sanford Premier Center; Sioux Falls, SD
*Non-conference game. ^{#}Rankings from AP poll. (#) Tournament seedings in parentheses. All times are in Mountain.
