= Tea Area School District (South Dakota) =

School district in South Dakota, United States

Address
- 131 N Poplar Ave Tea, South Dakota, 57064; United States

District information
- Grades: Pre-school - 12
- Established: 2003; 22 years ago
- Superintendent: Dr. Tonia Warzecha
- NCES District ID: 4600052

Students and staff
- Enrollment: 2,061 (2020-2021)
- Staff: 124.22 (on an FTE basis)
- Student–teacher ratio: 16.59
- District mascot: Titans

Other information
- Telephone: (605) 498-2700
- Website: www.teaarea.k12.sd.us

The Tea Area School District is a public school district in Lincoln County, based in Tea, South Dakota.

== Schools ==
The Tea Area School District has three elementary schools, one middle school, one high school and a district education center.

=== Elementary schools ===
- Tea Area Frontier Elementary School
- Tea Area Legacy Elementary School
- Tea Area Venture Elementary

=== Middle school ===
- Tea Area Middle School

=== High school ===
- Tea Area High School
