= 2024–25 North Dakota Fighting Hawks women's basketball team =

American college basketball season

2024–25 North Dakota Fighting Hawks women's basketball
- Conference: Summit League
- Record: 12–19 (6–10 Summit)
- Head coach: Mallory Bernhard (5th season)
- Associate head coach: Dennis Hutter
- Assistant coaches: Alex Kladis; Andi Gayner
- Home arena: Betty Engelstad Sioux Center

2024–25 Summit League women's basketball standings
	Conf.				Overall
Team	W		L	PCT	W		L	PCT
No. 24 South Dakota State †	16	–	0	1.000	30	–	4	.882
Oral Roberts	12	–	4	.750	24	–	9	.727
North Dakota State	11	–	5	.688	21	–	12	.636
St. Thomas*	9	–	7	.563	16	–	14	.533
North Dakota	6	–	10	.375	12	–	19	.387
Kansas City	6	–	10	.375	12	–	21	.364
South Dakota	5	–	11	.313	11	–	20	.355
Omaha	5	–	11	.313	14	–	17	.452
Denver	2	–	14	.125	9	–	21	.300
† 2025 Summit League tournament winner * Ineligible for the 2025 NCAA tournament due to transition from Division III; Rankings from AP poll

The 2024–25 North Dakota Fighting Hawks women's basketball team represented the University of North Dakota during the 2024–25 NCAA Division I women's basketball season. The Fighting Hawks, led by fifth-year head coach Mallory Bernhard, played their home games at the Betty Engelstad Sioux Center in Grand Forks, North Dakota, as members of the Summit League.

== Previous season ==
The Fighting Hawks finished the 2023–24 season 9–21, 5–11 in Summit League play, to finish in a tie for sixth place. They were defeated by Oral Roberts in the quarterfinals of the Summit League tournament.

== Preseason ==
On October 8, 2024, the Summit League released the preseason coaches poll. North Dakota was picked to finish seventh in the Summit League regular season.

=== Preseason rankings ===
Summit League preseason poll
Predicted finish	Team	Votes (1st place)
1	South Dakota State	562 (34)
2	Oral Roberts	479 (1)
3	North Dakota State	427 (1)
4	South Dakota	363
5	St. Thomas	336
6	Denver	220
7	North Dakota	188
8	Kansas City	144
9	Omaha	116

=== Preseason All-Summit League ===
No Fighting Hawks were named to the first or second Preseason All-Summit League teams.

== Roster ==
2024–25 North Dakota Fighting Hawks women's basketball team
Players
Coaches

Pos.	#	Name	Height	Year	Previous school	Hometown
F	0	Paris Bass	5 ft 11 in (1.8 m)	RS Fr	Wayne Memorial High School	Detroit, Michigan
G	1	Skyler Volmer	5 ft 9 in (1.75 m)	Fr	Lyman High School	Presho, South Dakota
G	2	Mikayla Aumer	5 ft 9 in (1.75 m)	Jr	Cambridge-Isanti High School	Mora, Minnesota
F	5	Kiyah Hurst	5 ft 11 in (1.8 m)	Jr	Milwaukee Academy of Science	Milwaukee, Wisconsin
F	6	Anaiyah Fletcher	6 ft 0 in (1.83 m)	Fr	Bond Academy	Oshawa, Ontario
F	7	Nevaeh Ferrara Horne	6 ft 2 in (1.88 m)	So	Southwest Academy	Regina, Saskatchewan
F	9	Kiera Pemberton	6 ft 1 in (1.85 m)	So	Walnut Grove Secondary School	Langley, British Columbia
C	10	Fatima Ibrahim	6 ft 3 in (1.91 m)	So	Royal Crown Academy	Winnipeg, Manitoba
G	12	Mataeya Mathern	6 ft 0 in (1.83 m)	Fr	Edgeley High School	Edgeley, North Dakota
G	15	Sydney Piekny	5 ft 11 in (1.8 m)	Fr	Niagara Prep	Fenwick, Ontario
G	22	Rakiyah Beal	5 ft 11 in (1.8 m)	Jr	Hamtramck High School	Detroit, Michigan
C	24	Walker Demers	6 ft 1 in (1.85 m)	Jr	South Dakota	Grafton, North Dakota
G	30	Jocelyn Schiller	5 ft 7 in (1.7 m)	Fr	Grand Forks Red River High School	Grand Forks, North Dakota
C	33	Miranda VanderWal	6 ft 7 in (2.01 m)	Jr	Southwest Academy	Strathroy, Ontario
G	44	Jayla Owen	5 ft 6 in (1.68 m)	Jr	Western Nebraska Community College	Dorval, Quebec

Head coach

- Mallory Bernhard (North Dakota)

Assistant coach(es)

- Dennis Hutter (Bethel)
- Alex Kladis (South Carolina)
- Andi Gayner (Mayville State)

Legend

- (C) Team captain
- (S) Suspended
- (I) Ineligible
- (W) Walk-on
- Injured
- Current redshirt

Roster
Last update: March 5, 2025

== Schedule and results ==
Date time, TV	Rank^{#}	Opponent^{#}	Result	Record	High points	High rebounds	High assists	Site (attendance) city, state
Non-conference regular season
November 4, 2024*; 4:30 pm, ESPN+		at Youngstown State	Canceled due to a power outage					Beeghly Center; Youngstown, OH
November 8, 2024*; 7:00 pm, SLN		Eastern Illinois	W 66–63	1–0	21 – Pemberton	12 – Pemberton	3 – Schiller	Betty Engelstad Sioux Center (1,712); Grand Forks, ND
November 12, 2024*; 7:30 pm, MidcoSN/SLN		vs. Dickinson State; Capital City Classic	W 77–58	2–0	19 – Aumer	6 – Ferrara Horne	2 – Tied	Bismarck Event Center (1,200); Bismarck, ND
November 17, 2024*; 2:00 pm, MidcoSN/SLN		Green Bay	L 63–66	2–1	17 – Aumer	10 – Pemberton	5 – Schiller	Betty Engelstad Sioux Center (1,599); Grand Forks, ND
November 21, 2024*; 7:00 pm, MidcoSN/SLN		Montana	L 59–71	2–2	17 – Ibrahim	7 – Schiller	3 – Schiller	Betty Engelstad Sioux Center (1,548); Grand Forks, ND
November 24, 2024*; 1:00 pm, ESPN+		at Western Kentucky	L 69–74	2–3	15 – Aumer	12 – Demers	5 – Schiller	E. A. Diddle Arena (767); Bowling Green, KY
November 30, 2024*; 1:30 pm		vs. Valparaiso; Christmas City Classic	L 57–76	2–4	17 – Demers	6 – Demers	4 – Aumer	Stabler Arena (489); Bethlehem, PA
December 1, 2024*; 11:00 am		vs. Marist; Christmas City Classic	L 56–60	2–5	15 – Pemberton	12 – Demers	2 – Tied	Stabler Arena (348); Bethlehem, PA
December 4, 2024*; 7:00 pm, MidcoSN/SLN		Weber State; Big Sky–Summit Challenge	W 73–69	3–5	16 – Aumer	9 – Ibrahim	4 – Schiller	Betty Engelstad Sioux Center (1,414); Grand Forks, ND
December 7, 2024*; 3:00 pm, ESPN+		at Northern Colorado; Big Sky–Summit Challenge	L 47–65	3–6	13 – Pemberton	4 – Pemberton	4 – Schiller	Bank of Colorado Arena (519); Greeley, CO
December 12, 2024*; 5:00 pm, ESPN+		at Drake	L 63–82	3–7	13 – Pemberton	13 – Demers	2 – Schiller	Knapp Center (4,222); Des Moines, IA
December 14, 2024*; 1:00 pm, SLN		Bethel	W 62–42	4–7	15 – Pemberton	6 – Tied	4 – Tied	Betty Engelstad Sioux Center; Grand Forks, ND
December 17, 2024*; 7:00 pm, SLN		Mayville State	W 73–61	5–7	25 – Pemberton	16 – Demers	5 – Ferrara Horne	Betty Engelstad Sioux Center (1,588); Grand Forks, ND
December 21, 2024*; 2:00 pm		at Wyoming	L 41–73	5–8	13 – Demers	5 – Tied	2 – Ferrara Horne	Arena-Auditorium (2,311); Laramie, WY
Summit League regular season
January 2, 2025; 7:00 pm, SLN		at Omaha	L 66–71	5–9 (0–1)	22 – Pemberton	13 – Pemberton	2 – Tied	Baxter Arena (683); Omaha, NE
January 4, 2025; 1:00 pm, SLN		at Kansas City	W 63–60	6–9 (1–1)	28 – Schiller	8 – Tied	3 – Pemberton	Swinney Recreation Center (345); Kansas City, MO
January 9, 2025; 7:00 pm, MidcoSN2/SLN		Oral Roberts	L 91–98 ^{2OT}	6–10 (1–2)	34 – Pemberton	8 – Tied	4 – Schiller	Betty Engelstad Sioux Center (1,489); Grand Forks, ND
January 11, 2025; 1:00 pm, MidcoSN/SLN		Denver	W 69–61	7–10 (2–2)	16 – Pemberton	8 – Schiller	4 – Schiller	Betty Engelstad Sioux Center (1,673); Grand Forks, ND
January 15, 2025; 7:00 pm, MidcoSN/SLN		South Dakota	W 80–54	8–10 (3–2)	17 – Aumer	13 – Tied	3 – Tied	Betty Engelstad Sioux Center (1,841); Grand Forks, ND
January 18, 2025; 2:00 pm, MidcoSN2/SLN		at South Dakota State	L 73–87	8–11 (3–3)	19 – Schiller	6 – Pemberton	5 – Ferrara Horne	First Bank and Trust Arena (3,129); Brookings, SD
January 25, 2025; 1:00 pm, WDAY/SLN		at North Dakota State	L 66–70	8–12 (3–4)	20 – Schiller	7 – Tied	1 – Tied	Scheels Center (2,210); Fargo, ND
January 30, 2025; 7:00 pm, MidcoSN/SLN		St. Thomas	L 71–76	8–13 (3–5)	20 – Demers	15 – Demers	4 – Schiller	Betty Engelstad Sioux Center (1,624); Grand Forks, ND
February 1, 2025; 2:00 pm, SLN		at South Dakota	L 66–76	8–14 (3–6)	19 – Pemberton	17 – Pemberton	3 – Schiller	Sanford Coyote Sports Center (2,042); Vermillion, SD
February 5, 2025; 7:00 pm, SLN		South Dakota State	L 45–66	8–15 (3–7)	13 – Schiller	7 – Ibrahim	1 – Schiller	Betty Engelstad Sioux Center (1,529); Grand Forks, ND
February 12, 2025; 7:00 pm, SLN		at St. Thomas	L 54–77	8–16 (3–8)	13 – Aumer	11 – Demers	5 – Schiller	Schoenecker Arena (402); St. Paul, MN
February 15, 2025; 7:00 pm, MidcoSN/SLN		North Dakota State	W 65–60	9–16 (4–8)	22 – Pemberton	8 – Pemberton	2 – Tied	Betty Engelstad Sioux Center (1,964); Grand Forks, ND
February 20, 2025; 7:00 pm, SLN		at Oral Roberts	L 80–83	9–17 (4–9)	21 – Tied	10 – Tied	5 – Schiller	Mabee Center (1,519); Tulsa, OK
February 22, 2025; 2:00 pm, MidcoSN2/SLN		at Denver	W 73–68	10–17 (5–9)	21 – Pemberton	14 – Ibrahim	3 – Aumer	Hamilton Gymnasium (465); Denver, CO
February 27, 2025; 7:00 pm, MidcoSN/SLN		Omaha	L 70–76	10–18 (5–10)	26 – Pemberton	16 – Ibrahim	3 – Aumer	Betty Engelstad Sioux Center (1,544); Grand Forks, ND
March 1, 2025; 1:00 pm, MidcoSN2/SLN		Kansas City	W 83–79	11–18 (6–10)	22 – Schiller	11 – Pemberton	4 – Schiller	Betty Engelstad Sioux Center (1,713); Grand Forks, ND
Summit League tournament
March 7, 2025; 12:00 pm, SLN	(5)	vs. (4) St. Thomas; Quarterfinals	W 80–67	12–18	30 – Pemberton	10 – Ibrahim	8 – Schiller	Denny Sanford Premier Center (4,825); Sioux Falls, SD
March 8, 2025; 2:30 pm, SLN	(5)	vs. (1) No. 25 South Dakota State; Semifinals	L 55–84	12–19	23 – Pemberton	9 – Ibrahim	3 – Pemberton	Denny Sanford Premier Center; Sioux Falls, SD
*Non-conference game. ^{#}Rankings from AP poll. (#) Tournament seedings in parentheses. All times are in Central.
