= 2024–25 Omaha Mavericks women's basketball team =

American college basketball season

2024–25 Omaha Mavericks women's basketball
- Conference: Summit League
- Record: 14–17 (5–11 Summit)
- Head coach: Carrie Banks (5th season)
- Assistant coaches: Ansar Al-Ameen; Jaelyn Richard Harris; La'Karis Salter
- Home arena: Baxter Arena

2024–25 Summit League women's basketball standings
	Conf.				Overall
Team	W		L	PCT	W		L	PCT
No. 24 South Dakota State †	16	–	0	1.000	30	–	4	.882
Oral Roberts	12	–	4	.750	24	–	9	.727
North Dakota State	11	–	5	.688	21	–	12	.636
St. Thomas*	9	–	7	.563	16	–	14	.533
North Dakota	6	–	10	.375	12	–	19	.387
Kansas City	6	–	10	.375	12	–	21	.364
South Dakota	5	–	11	.313	11	–	20	.355
Omaha	5	–	11	.313	14	–	17	.452
Denver	2	–	14	.125	9	–	21	.300
† 2025 Summit League tournament winner * Ineligible for the 2025 NCAA tournament due to transition from Division III; Rankings from AP poll

The 2024–25 Omaha Mavericks women's basketball team represented the University of Nebraska Omaha during the 2024–25 NCAA Division I women's basketball season. The Mavericks, led by fifth-year head coach Carrie Banks, played their home games at Baxter Arena in Omaha, Nebraska as members of the Summit League.

The Mavericks finished the season 14–17, 5–11 in Summit League play, to finish in the tie for seventh place. They beat Denver in the first round of the Summit League tournament before being defeated by top-seeded South Dakota State in the quarterfinals.

== Previous season ==
The Mavericks finished the 2023–24 season 8–23, 3–13 in Summit League play, to finish in a tie for last place. They defeated Kansas City in the first round of the Summit League tournament before falling to top-seeded and eventual tournament champions South Dakota State in the quarterfinals.

== Preseason ==
On October 8, 2024, the Summit League released their preseason coaches poll. Omaha was picked to finish last in the Summit League regular season.

=== Preseason rankings ===
Summit League preseason poll
Predicted finish	Team	Votes (1st place)
1	South Dakota State	562 (34)
2	Oral Roberts	479 (1)
3	North Dakota State	427 (1)
4	South Dakota	363
5	St. Thomas	336
6	Denver	220
7	North Dakota	188
8	Kansas City	144
9	Omaha	116

=== Preseason All-Summit League ===
Preseason All-Summit League teams
Team	Player	Position	Year
2nd	Grace Cave	Guard	Senior

== Roster ==
2024–25 Omaha Mavericks women's basketball team
Players
Coaches

Pos.	#	Name	Height	Year	Previous school	Hometown
C	0	Harriet Ford	6 ft 3 in (1.91 m)	Fr	Cockburn Cougars	Perth, Australia
F	1	Aaliyah Moore	6 ft 1 in (1.85 m)	Sr	Loyola Chicago	Milwaukee, WI
G	2	Lauren Perry	5 ft 7 in (1.7 m)	Jr	Lakeland Community College	Sylvania, OH
G	4	Daria Shelby	5 ft 8 in (1.73 m)	Fr	Belleville High School	Canton, MI
G	10	Mar Vidal	5 ft 9 in (1.75 m)	Jr	Felician	Barcelona, Spain
F	11	Ali Stephens	5 ft 11 in (1.8 m)	So	Homestead High School	Fort Wayne, IN
G	13	Alana Powell	5 ft 8 in (1.73 m)	So	CCBC Essex	Haymarket, VA
G	14	Katie Keitges	5 ft 8 in (1.73 m)	GS	Knoxville High School	Knoxville, IA
F	15	Paige Horne	6 ft 0 in (1.83 m)	Fr	Scottsbluff High School	Scottsbluff, NE
G	20	Grace Cave	5 ft 7 in (1.7 m)	Sr	Weeping Water High School	Weeping Water, NE
F	22	Cora Olsen	5 ft 9 in (1.75 m)	So	Millard South High School	Omaha, NE
G	23	Kendyl Delimont	5 ft 6 in (1.68 m)	Fr	Ainsworth High School	Ainsworth, NE
F	24	Morgann Gardner	6 ft 2 in (1.88 m)	Sr	Racine Lutheran High School	Racine, WI
G	50	Ja Harvey	5 ft 6 in (1.68 m)	Sr	Fresno State	San Diego, CA

Head coach

- Carrie Banks (Detroit Mercy)

Assistant coach(es)

- Ansar Al-Ameen (Air Force)
- Jaelyn Richard Harris (LSU)
- La'Karis Salter (Mississippi)

Legend

- (C) Team captain
- (S) Suspended
- (I) Ineligible
- (W) Walk-on
- Injured
- Current redshirt

Roster
Last update: March 6, 2025

== Schedule and results ==
Date time, TV	Rank^{#}	Opponent^{#}	Result	Record	High points	High rebounds	High assists	Site (attendance) city, state
Exhibition
October 27, 2024*; 2:00 p.m.		at Drake	L 79–96	–	26 – Cave	7 – Moore	4 – Cave	Knapp Center (2,106); Des Moines, IA
Non-conference regular season
November 4, 2024*; 12:00 p.m., B1G+		at No. 23 Nebraska	L 48–88	0–1	15 – Powell	5 – Ford	1 – 5 tied	Pinnacle Bank Arena (8,106); Lincoln, NE
November 7, 2024*; 11:00 a.m., SLN		College of Saint Mary	W 108–45	1–1	21 – Moore	15 – Ford	7 – Powell	Baxter Arena (4,866); Omaha, NE
November 10, 2024*; 2:00 p.m., SLN		Western Illinois	L 83–89	1–2	20 – Cave	13 – Ford	6 – Harvey	Baxter Arena (306); Omaha, NE
November 14, 2024*; 6:30 p.m., ESPN+		at Kansas	L 56–75	1–3	21 – Cave	9 – Ford	5 – Cave	Allen Fieldhouse (2,794); Lawrence, KS
November 23, 2024*; 1:00 p.m., B1G+		at Wisconsin	L 65–67	1–4	14 – Harvey	6 – Ford	5 – Cave	Kohl Center (3,014); Madison, WI
November 26, 2024*; 7:00 p.m., SLN		Utah State	W 79–77 ^{OT}	2–4	16 – Olsen	10 – Ford	4 – 2 tied	Baxter Arena (440); Omaha, NE
November 29, 2024*; 4:00 p.m., ESPN+		at San Diego; USD Thanksgiving Classic	W 70–66	3–4	14 – 2 tied	7 – Cave	5 – Cave	Jenny Craig Pavilion (186); San Diego, CA
November 30, 2024*; 4:00 p.m.		vs. Utah Valley; USD Thanksgiving Classic	W 53–48	4–4	13 – Cave	5 – 2 tied	5 – 2 tied	Jenny Craig Pavilion (97); San Diego, CA
December 4, 2024*; 9:00 p.m., ESPN+		at Portland State; Big Sky–Summit Challenge	W 65–57	5–4	13 – Moore	5 – Moore	4 – Cave	Viking Pavilion (301); Portland, OR
December 7, 2024*; 2:00 p.m., SLN		Sacramento State; Big Sky–Summit Challenge	W 67–63	6–4	17 – Cave	8 – Gardner	6 – Cave	Baxter Arena (757); Omaha, NE
December 14, 2024*; 1:00 p.m., ESPN+		at Lindenwood	W 73–66	7–4	19 – Harvey	6 – 3 tied	3 – Cave	Hyland Performance Arena (267); St. Charles, MO
December 18, 2024*; 6:00 p.m., SLN		Bellevue	W 84–53	8–4	18 – Harvey	9 – Gardner	3 – 2 tied	Sapp Fieldhouse (476); Omaha, NE
December 22, 2024*; 3:00 p.m., SECN+		at No. 10 Oklahoma	L 65–111	8–5	21 – Harvey	7 – Olsen	2 – 2 tied	Lloyd Noble Center (6,244); Norman, OK
Summit League regular season
January 2, 2025; 7:00 p.m., SLN		North Dakota	W 71–66	9–5 (1–0)	24 – Harvey	4 – 4 tied	4 – Olsen	Baxter Arena (683); Omaha, NE
January 9, 2025; 7:00 p.m., SLN		at South Dakota State	L 55–93	9–6 (1–1)	12 – Ford	5 – Moore	5 – Cave	First Bank and Trust Arena (2,074); Brookings, SD
January 11, 2025; 1:00 p.m., SLN		at South Dakota	L 66–71	9–7 (1–2)	16 – 2 tied	9 – Ford	4 – Cave	Sanford Coyote Sports Center (1,518); Vermillion, SD
January 16, 2025; 7:00 p.m., SLN		North Dakota State	L 67–81	9–8 (1–3)	22 – Cave	6 – Harvey	2 – 3 tied	Baxter Arena (693); Omaha, NE
January 18, 2025; 2:00 p.m., SLN		St. Thomas	L 53–67	9–9 (1–4)	16 – Harvey	7 – Moore	3 – Cave	Baxter Arena (416); Omaha, NE
January 22, 2025; 7:00 p.m., SLN		at Denver	L 56–71	9–10 (1–5)	19 – Cave	7 – 2 tied	2 – 2 tied	Hamilton Gymnasium (283); Denver, CO
January 25, 2025; 1:00 p.m., SLN		Kansas City	L 65–66	9–11 (1–6)	21 – Cave	11 – Moore	6 – Cave	Baxter Arena (475); Omaha, NE
January 29, 2025; 7:00 p.m., SLN		at Oral Roberts	L 57–95	9–12 (1–7)	17 – Powell	8 – Ford	2 – Ford	Mabee Center (1,588); Tulsa, OK
February 1, 2025; 2:00 p.m., SLN		South Dakota State	L 63–93	9–13 (1–8)	18 – Cave	6 – Ford	6 – Cave	Baxter Arena (930); Omaha, NE
February 5, 2025; 7:00 p.m., SLN		at St. Thomas	L 62–75	9–14 (1–9)	15 – Cave	7 – Ford	7 – Harvey	Schoenecker Arena (309); St. Paul, MN
February 8, 2025; 1:00 p.m., SLN		at Kansas City	W 65–56	10–14 (2–9)	29 – Cave	17 – Ford	3 – Keitges	Swinney Recreation Center (566); Kansas City, MO
February 12, 2025; 7:00 p.m., SLN		Oral Roberts	L 74–105	10–15 (2–10)	19 – Cave	6 – Ford	4 – Cave	Baxter Arena (410); Omaha, NE
February 15, 2025; 2:00 p.m., SLN		Denver	W 80–77 ^{OT}	11–15 (3–10)	25 – Cave	18 – Ford	8 – Cave	Baxter Arena (470); Omaha, NE
February 20, 2025; 7:00 p.m., SLN		South Dakota	W 71–57	12–15 (4–10)	34 – Harvey	19 – Moore	5 – Cave	Baxter Arena (475); Omaha, NE
February 27, 2025; 7:00 p.m., SLN		at North Dakota	W 76–70	13–15 (5–10)	26 – Harvey	10 – Moore	3 – 3 tied	Betty Engelstad Sioux Center (1,544); Grand Forks, ND
March 1, 2025; 1:00 p.m., SLN		at North Dakota State	L 59–76	13–16 (5–11)	24 – Cave	4 – 2 tied	3 – Cave	Scheels Center (1,059); Fargo, ND
Summit League tournament
March 5, 2025; 4:30 p.m., SLN	(8)	vs. (9) Denver; First round	W 76–68	14–16	20 – Harvey	11 – Moore	4 – Powell	Denny Sanford Premier Center; Sioux Falls, SD
March 6, 2025; 2:00 p.m., SLN	(8)	vs. (1) No. 25 South Dakota State; Quarterfinals	L 67–87	14–17	20 – Cave	7 – 2 tied	4 – Harvey	Denny Sanford Premier Center (7,195); Sioux Falls, SD
*Non-conference game. ^{#}Rankings from AP poll. (#) Tournament seedings in parentheses. All times are in Central.
