= Tea Area High School =

Coordinates: 43.4548°N 96.8428°W

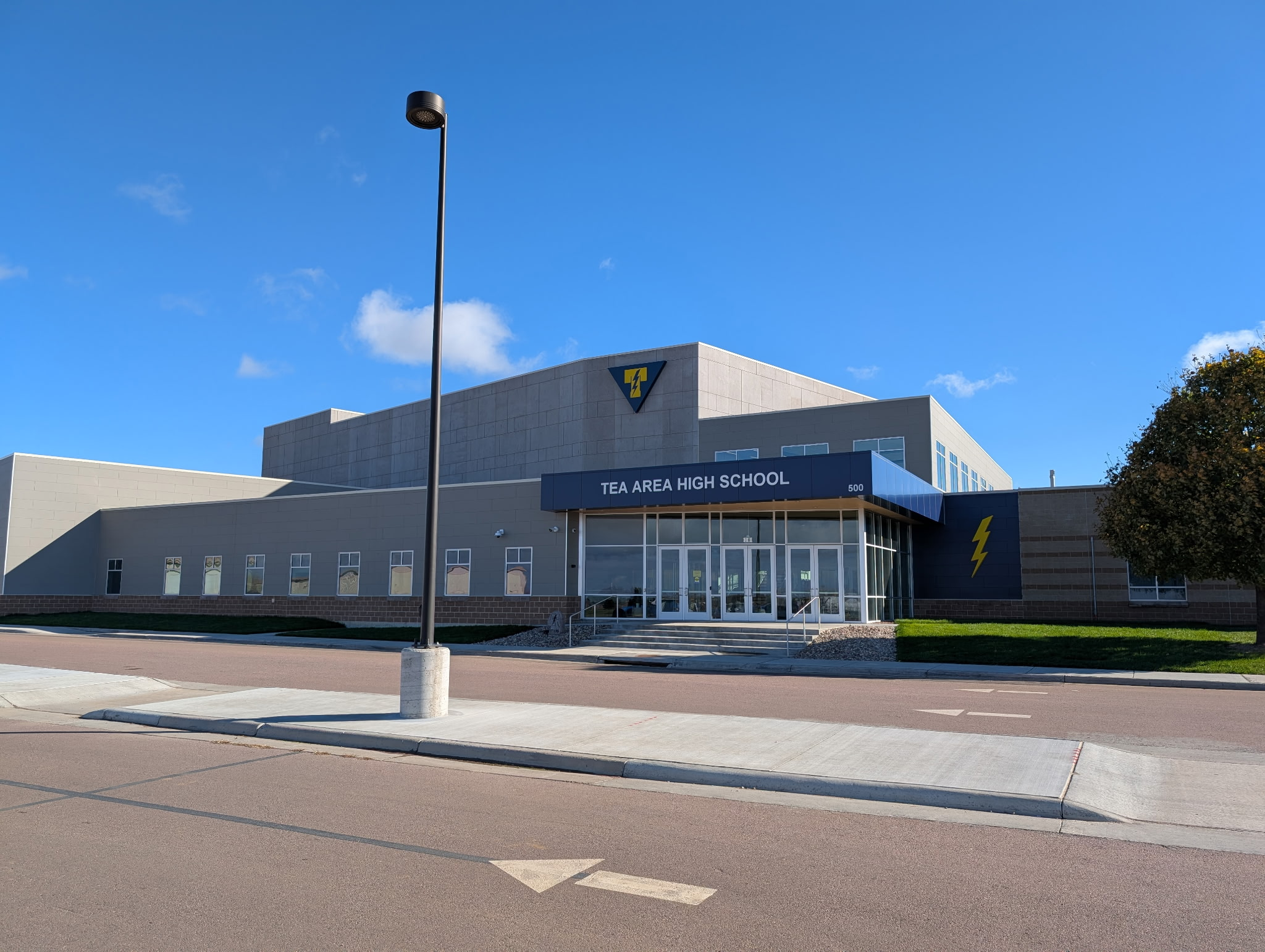
- 500 W Brian St.Tea, South Dakota

Information
- Funding type: Public
- School district: Tea Area School District
- Principal: Collin Knudson
- Teaching staff: 35.27 (FTE)
- Enrollment: 670 (2023-2024)
- Student to teacher ratio: 19.00
- Colors: Blue and Gold
- Mascot: Titan
- Website: www.teaarea.k12.sd.us/high-school-home

Tea Area High School is a high school located in Tea, South Dakota. Tea High School originated in 1879 with the building of the first schoolhouse (built 1 1/2 miles west of the present edifice). There was an enrollment of 11 pupils and first teacher was Mr. Mahor. A two-story schoolhouse was built in Tea in 1904 which was used until the present one was built in 1959.

In May 2002, the Tea Area School District was formed when district voters agreed to separate from the Lennox School District and form the Tea Area School District.

Tea Area became the state's 177th K-12 school district in July 2003.

Classes began at TAHS in fall of 2003.

In 2005, Tea Area High School was built ($7.5 million) and opened at its current location at 500 W. Brian Street.

In 2022, voters overwhelming (86%) agreed to fund a $39 million high school expansion that will double the size of the high school including a 1,100-seat performing arts center, additional gymnasium, wrestling room, renovated strength & conditioning room and 25 new classrooms.

In 2022, Tea Area High Schools twentieth anniversary, the Tea Area Hall of Fame was formed. Inductees include:

Academic Inductee: Winslow Burnette

Art Inductee: Leslie (Fylling) Nelson

Athletic Inductee: Tyler Edblom

Titan Pride Inductee(s): First Five School Board Members

== Athletics ==
As of 2025, the Titans moved up to compete in the AA division, making them the states 20th South Dakota school to compete in AA. Athletic teams for boys include football, basketball, track, cross-country, wrestling, golf, soccer and baseball, which is non-sanctioned (as of 2023).

Teams for girls include volleyball, basketball, track, cross country, golf, soccer, competitive cheer, competitive dance and softball (started in 2023).

State Championships (17 since 2011):

• Boys Baseball - 2023

- Boys Basketball - 2017, 2019
- Girls Basketball -
- Boys Cross country -
- Girls Cross country -
- Boys Football - 2018, 2020
- Boys Golf - 2016, 2018, 2021
- Girls Volleyball -
- Boys Soccer- 2013, 2017, 2018, 2019
- Girls Soccer- 2019, 2022, 2023
- Boys Track - 2011
- Girls Track -
- Girls Softball - 2024
