= Tea, South Dakota =

- City
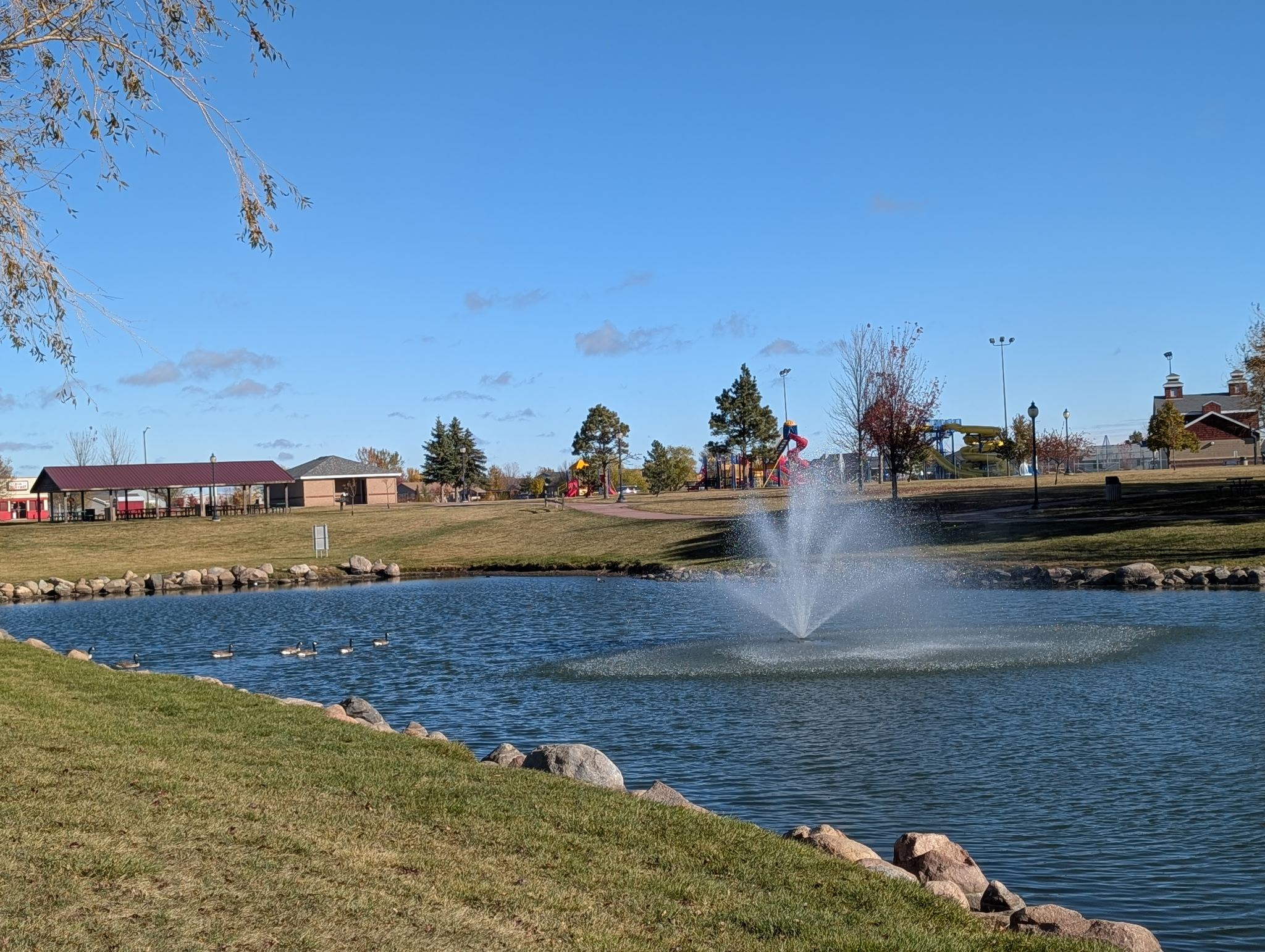
- A view of the Tea City Park facing northeast from the southwest side of the park.
- Motto: "Tea...A Growing Tradition"
- Location of Tea, South Dakota
- Coordinates: 43°27′20″N 96°49′26″W
- Country: United States
- State: South Dakota
- County: Lincoln
- Founded: 1894

Government
  - Type: Mayor–council
  - Mayor: Casey Voelker
  - Councilmembers: Ward I: Lynn DeYoung & Josh Chapman; Ward II: Aaron Otten & Jim Erck; Ward III: Terry Woessner & Ruby Zuraff
  - City Administrator: Justin Weiland
  - Finance Officer: Dawn Murphy
  - Planning & Zoning Administrator: Albert Schmidt

Area
  - Total: 3.859 sq mi (9.995 km^{2})
  - Land: 3.859 sq mi (9.995 km^{2})
  - Water: 0 sq mi (0.000 km^{2})
- Elevation: 1,490 ft (450 m)

Population (2020)
  - Total: 5,598
  - Density: 1,451/sq mi (560.1/km^{2})
- Time zone: UTC–6 (Central (CST))
  - Summer (DST): UTC–5 (CDT)
- ZIP Code: 57064
- Area codes: 605
- FIPS code: 46-63100
- GNIS feature ID: 1267599
- Website: teasd.com

Tea is an incorporated city in Lincoln County, South Dakota, United States and is a suburb of Sioux Falls. The population was 5,598 at the 2020 census, and was estimated at 7,699 in 2024.

Tea was laid out in 1894. The name "Tea" was selected on account of its brevity and is said to have no significance.

== Geography ==
According to the United States Census Bureau, the city has a total area of 3.859 square miles (9.99 km^{2}), all land.

== Demographics ==
Historical population
Census	Pop.	Note	%±
1910	134		—
1920	165		23.1%
1930	148		−10.3%
1940	165		11.5%
1950	151		−8.5%
1960	188		24.5%
1970	302		60.6%
1980	729		141.4%
1990	786		7.8%
2000	1,742		121.6%
2010	3,806		118.5%
2020	5,598		47.1%
2024 (est.)	7,699		37.5%
U.S. Decennial Census; 2020 Census

=== 2020 census ===
As of the 2020 census, Tea had a population of 5,598, 1,897 households, and 1,440 families; the population density was 1,646.96 people per square mile and there were 1,970 housing units at an average density of 579.58 per square mile.

The median age was 29.7 years; 36.1% of residents were under the age of 18 and 5.1% of residents were 65 years of age or older. For every 100 females there were 98.8 males, and for every 100 females age 18 and over there were 94.1 males age 18 and over.

99.6% of residents lived in urban areas, while 0.4% lived in rural areas.

There were 1,897 households in Tea, of which 52.8% had children under the age of 18 living in them; 55.1% were married-couple households, 14.0% were households with a male householder and no spouse or partner present, and 21.1% were households with a female householder and no spouse or partner present. About 17.2% of all households were made up of individuals and 3.9% had someone living alone who was 65 years of age or older.

Of the 1,970 housing units, 3.7% were vacant; the homeowner vacancy rate was 1.0% and the rental vacancy rate was 6.3%.

Racial composition as of the 2020 census
Race	Number	Percent
White	5,135	91.7%
Black or African American	68	1.2%
American Indian and Alaska Native	49	0.9%
Asian	20	0.4%
Native Hawaiian and Other Pacific Islander	1	0.0%
Some other race	35	0.6%
Two or more races	290	5.2%
Hispanic or Latino (of any race)	131	2.3%

=== 2010 census ===
As of the 2010 census, there were 3,806 people, 1,254 households, and 1,009 families residing in the city. The population density was 2,250.74 inhabitants per square mile (869.0/km^{2}). There were 1,354 housing units at an average density of 800.71 per square mile (309.2/km^{2}). The racial makeup of the city was 96.90% White, 0.66% African American, 0.13% Native American, 0.11% Asian, 0.00% Pacific Islander, 0.32% from some other races and 1.89% from two or more races. Hispanic or Latino people of any race were 1.26% of the population.

There were 1,254 households, of which 59.1% had children under the age of 18 living with them, 63.2% were married couples living together, 12.6% had a female householder with no husband present, 4.7% had a male householder with no wife present, and 19.5% were non-families. 14.0% of all households were made up of individuals, and 2.2% had someone living alone who was 65 years of age or older. The average household size was 3.04 and the average family size was 3.35.

The median age in the city was 27.7 years. 37.5% of residents were under the age of 18; 7.6% were between the ages of 18 and 24; 38.3% were from 25 to 44; 13.9% were from 45 to 64; and 3% were 65 years of age or older. The gender makeup of the city was 50.6% male and 49.4% female.

=== 2000 census ===
As of the 2000 census, there were 1,742 people, 590 households, and 489 families residing in the city. The population density was 2,877.8 inhabitants per square mile (1,111.1/km^{2}). There were 600 housing units at an average density of 991.2 per square mile (382.7/km^{2}). The racial makeup of the city was 96.67% White, 0.40% African American, 0.34% Native American, 0.34% Asian, 0.06% Pacific Islander, 0.40% from some other races and 1.78% from two or more races. Hispanic or Latino people of any race were 0.86% of the population.

There were 590 households, out of which 55.6% had children under the age of 18 living with them, 67.3% were married couples living together, 12.7% had a female householder with no husband present, and 17.1% were non-families. 13.1% of all households were made up of individuals, and 2.2% had someone living alone who was 65 years of age or older. The average household size was 2.95 and the average family size was 3.23.

In the city, the population was spread out, with 36.2% under the age of 18, 7.3% from 18 to 24, 40.8% from 25 to 44, 12.5% from 45 to 64, and 3.2% who were 65 years of age or older. The median age was 28 years. For every 100 females, there were 98.4 males. For every 100 females age 18 and over, there were 94.9 males.

The median household income was $50,671 and the median family income was $52,297. Males had a median income of $32,734 compared with $23,860 for females. The per capita income was $17,719. Approximately 2.1% of families and 3.1% of the population were below the poverty line, including 3.8% of those under age 18 and 5.8% of those age 65 or over.

== Education ==
Tea Public Schools are part of the Tea Area School District. The Tea Area School District has three elementary schools, one middle school, and one high school. Students attend Tea Area High School.

== Parks ==
Tea contains four recreational areas: Tea City Park, Tea Athletic Complex, Howling Ridge Park, and Prairie Trails Park.
