= Carrie Banks =

American basketball player and coach

Playing career
- 1996–2000: Detroit Mercy

Coaching career (HC unless noted)
- 2004–2006: Dublin Jerome HS (JV HC)
- 2008–2010: Detroit Mercy (assistant)
- 2010: South Florida (assistant)
- 2010–2013: Northwestern (assistant)
- 2016–2020: Ohio State (assistant)
- 2020–2025: Omaha

Head coaching record
- Overall: 51–89 (.364)

Accomplishments and honors

Awards
- First-team All-Horizon League (2000); 3x Horizon League All-Defensive Team (1998–2000)

Carrie Banks is an American basketball coach and former player who recently was the head coach of the Omaha Mavericks women's basketball team.

== Coaching career ==
On April 7, 2020, Banks was hired as the ninth head coach in University of Nebraska Omaha program history. Banks signed a contract extension after the 2023–24 season.

== Head coaching record ==
Statistics overview
Season	Coach	Overall	Conference	Standing	Postseason
Omaha (Summit League) (2020–2025)
2020–21	Omaha	7–13	4–8	7th	
2021–22	Omaha	7–19	3–14	10th	
2022–23	Omaha	15–17	8–10	6th	
2023–24	Omaha	8–23	3–13	9th	
2024–25	Omaha	14–17	5–11	8th	
Omaha:		51–89 (.364)	23–56 (.291)		
Total:		51–89 (.364)			
National champion Postseason invitational champion Conference regular season champion Conference regular season and conference tournament champion Division regular season champion Division regular season and conference tournament champion Conference tournament champion
