= Dionnah Jackson-Durrett =

American basketball coach and former player

Biographical details
- Born: August 15, 1982 (age 44); St. Louis, Missouri, United States

Playing career
- 2001–2005: Oklahoma

Coaching career (HC unless noted)
- 2010–2013: Southeast Missouri State (asst.)
- 2013–2015: George Mason (asst.)
- 2015–2019: Mississippi State (asst.)
- 2019–2020: Mississippi State (assoc. HC)
- 2020–2022: Texas (assoc. HC)
- 2022–2026: Kansas City

Dionnah Shawntee Jackson-Durrett (née Jackson; born August 15, 1982) is an American basketball coach and former player, who is the former head coach of the Kansas City Roos women's basketball team.

== Early life and playing career ==
A native of St. Louis, Missouri, Jackson-Durrett attended Parkway West High School where she was named the Missouri High School Player of the Year in 2001.

== Coaching career ==
On March 30, 2022, Jackson-Durrett was hired as the 11th head coach in Kansas City Roos program history. Her initial three-year contract, had a base salary of $275,000 per year.
