= 2023–24 Oral Roberts Golden Eagles women's basketball team =

Women's basketball season

2023–24 Oral Roberts Golden Eagles women's basketball

WNIT, First Round
- Conference: Summit League
- Record: 21–11 (11–5 The Summit)
- Head coach: Kelsi Musick (2nd season)
- Assistant coaches: Cophie Anderson; Bill Annan; Hayden Priddy
- Home arena: Mabee Center

2023–24 Summit League women's basketball standings
	Conf.				Overall
Team	W		L	PCT	W		L	PCT
South Dakota State †	16	–	0	1.000	27	–	6	.818
North Dakota State	13	–	3	.813	22	–	12	.647
Oral Roberts	11	–	5	.688	21	–	11	.656
South Dakota	9	–	7	.563	23	–	13	.639
St. Thomas*	7	–	9	.438	15	–	16	.484
North Dakota	5	–	11	.313	9	–	21	.300
Denver	5	–	11	.313	8	–	22	.267
Kansas City	3	–	13	.188	12	–	20	.375
Omaha	3	–	13	.188	8	–	23	.258
† 2024 Summit League tournament winner * Ineligible for the 2024 NCAA tournament due to transition from Division III

The 2023–24 Oral Roberts Golden Eagles women's basketball team represented Oral Roberts University in the 2023–24 NCAA Division I women's basketball season. The Golden Eagles, led by second year head coach Kelsi Musick, competed in the Summit League. They played their home games in Mabee Center in Tulsa, Oklahoma.

== Previous season ==
The Golden Eagles finished the 2022–23 season 12–19, 8–10 in Summit League play to finish in a 3-way tie for fifth place. As the No. 4 seed in the Summit League tournament, they defeated South Dakota in the quarterfinals before losing to the regular season champion South Dakota State by 60-87.

== Offseason ==
=== Departures ===
Oral Roberts Departures
Name	Num	Pos.	Height	Year	Hometown	Reason for Departure
Maggie Sockey	1	G	5'8"	Freshman	Red Oak, OK	Transferred to Missouri Southern State University (D-II)
Nena Taylor	3	G	5'9"	(redshirt) Junior	Parson, KS	TBD
Elayna Whitley	4	F	6'0"	(redshirt) Freshman	Leesburg, VA	TBD
Ariel Walker	11	G	5'6"	GS Senior	Ozark, AR	Graduated
Makenna Winans	12	F	6'0"	Junior	Parkersburg, WV	Transferred to Henderson State University (D-II)
Delaney Nix	14	G	5'8"	GS Senior	Tahlequah, OK	Graduated
Lauren Ramey	20	G	6'1"	GS Senior	Kiefer, OK	Graduated
Talia Pogi	23	G	5'9"	Freshman	Mustang, OK	Transferred to University of Central Oklahoma (D-II)
Tirzah Moore	32	F	6'0"	Sophomore	Oklahoma City, OK	Transferred to West Virginia University
Elena Lijo	33	C	6'5"	Freshman	La Coruña, Spain	TBD
Trinity Moore	35	F	6'0"	Sophomore	Oklahoma City, OK	Transferred to Stephen F. Austin State University

=== Incoming ===
Oral Roberts incoming transfers
Name	Num	Pos.	Height	Year	Hometown	Previous School
Sephora Kayolo	5	F	6'1"	Junior	Kinshasa, DR Congo	Grayson College (NJCAA)
Taleyah Jones	10	G	5'10"	Sophomore	Broken Arrow, OK	University of Texas at Arlington
Jalei Oglesby	11	G	5'8"	(redshirt) Sophomore	Howe, OK	Arkansas Tech
Ashlyn Sage	15	G	6'2"	(redshirt) Sophomore	Weatherford, OK	Arkansas
Meghan Weinrich	20	G	5'10"	Junior	Willows, CA	Butte College
Makyra Tramble	34	F	5'10"	GS Senior	Shawnee, OK	Oklahoma State

=== 2023 recruiting class ===
College recruiting information
Name	Hometown	School	Height	Weight	Commit date
Annyka Hellendrung; G	Milwaukee, WI	Waukesha West High School	5 ft 9 in (1.75 m)	N/A	August 4th, 2022
Annyka Hellendrung; G	Recruit ratings: No ratings found				
Gentry Baldwin; G	Bixby, OK	Bixby High School	5 ft 5 in (1.65 m)	N/A	November 10th, 2022
Gentry Baldwin; G	Recruit ratings: No ratings found				
Emily Robinson; F	Bokchito, OK	Caddo High School	5 ft 10 in (1.78 m)	N/A	November 10th, 2022
Emily Robinson; F	Recruit ratings: No ratings found				
Overall recruit ranking:
Note: In many cases, Scout, Rivals, 247Sports, On3, and ESPN may conflict in their listings of height and weight.; In these cases, the average was taken. ESPN grades are on a 100-point scale.; Sources:

== Preseason ==
=== Summit League Preseason poll ===
The Summit League Preseason poll and other preseason awards was released on October 10, 2023, with the Golden Eagles selected to finish in fifth place in the Summit League.

Coaches Poll
Predicted finish	Team	Votes (1st place)
1	South Dakota State	577 (27)
2	North Dakota State	526 (5)
3	South Dakota	485 (2)
4	North Dakota	434
5	Oral Roberts	357 (1)
6	Omaha	263
7	Denver	233 (1)
8	St. Thomas	203
9	Kansas City	174

=== Preseason All-Summit teams ===
The Golden Eagles had two player selected to the preseason all-Summit teams.

First team

Hannah Cooper

Second team

Ruthie Udoumoh

== Roster ==
2023–24 Oral Roberts Golden Eagles women's basketball team
Players
Coaches

Pos.	#	Name	Height	Year	Previous school	Hometown
G	1	Annyka Hellendrung	5 ft 9 in (1.75 m)	Fr	Waukesha West HS	Waukesha, WI
G	2	Hannah Cooper	5 ft 7 in (1.7 m)	GS	Andress HS; Western Colorado	El Paso, TX
G	3	Gentry Baldwin	5 ft 5 in (1.65 m)	Fr	Bixby HS	Bixby, OK
G	5	Sephora Kayolo	6 ft 1 in (1.85 m)	Jr	Grayson College	Kinshasa, Congo
G	10	Taleyah Jones	5 ft 10 in (1.78 m)	So	Broken Arrow HS; UT Arlington	Broken Arrow, OK
G	11	Jalei Oglesby	5 ft 8 in (1.73 m)	RS So	Howe HS; Arkansas Tech	Howe, OK
G	15	Ashlyn Sage	6 ft 2 in (1.88 m)	RS So	Weatherford HS; Arkansas	Weatherford, OK
G	20	Meghan Weinrich	5 ft 10 in (1.78 m)	Jr	Willows HS; Butte College	Willows, CA
F	22	Ruthie Udoumoh	6 ft 1 in (1.85 m)	Sr	Victory Christian; Oklahoma State	Broken Arrow, OK
F	23	Emily Robinson	5 ft 10 in (1.78 m)	Fr	Caddo HS	Bokchito, OK
F	30	Sara Rodrigues	6 ft 3 in (1.91 m)	GS	Colégio Integrado de Guarulhos; Oklahoma State	São Paulo, Brazil
G	33	Tara Biocanin	6 ft 3 in (1.91 m)	Fr	Sava Tekelija	Kruševac, Serbia
F	34	Makyra Tramble	5 ft 10 in (1.78 m)	GS	Shawnee HS; Oklahoma State	Shawnee, OK

Head coach

- Kelsi Musick (Cameron)

Assistant coach(es)

- Cophie Anderson (Fresno State)
- Bill Annan (Kansas State)
- Hayden Priddy (Southwestern Oklahoma State)

Legend

- (C) Team captain
- (S) Suspended
- (I) Ineligible
- (W) Walk-on
- Injured
- Current redshirt

Roster

== Schedule and results ==
Date time, TV	Rank^{#}	Opponent^{#}	Result	Record	High points	High rebounds	High assists	Site (attendance) city, state
Regular season
November 6, 2023*; 4:00 p.m., ESPN+		at TCU	L 56–76	0–1	17 – Jones	12 – Oglesby	4 – Sage	Schollmaier Arena (1,622); Fort Worth, TX
November 9, 2023*; 11:00 a.m., SLN		Friends	W 100–47	1–1	22 – Jones	10 – Robinson	6 – Cooper	Mabee Center (6,358); Tulsa, OK
November 12, 2023*; 2:00 p.m., ESPN+		at Oklahoma	L 70–80	1–2	19 – Robinson	9 – Udoumoh	3 – Cooper	Lloyd Noble Center (2,584); Norman, OK
November 14, 2023*; 7:00 p.m., SLN		Mid-America Christian	W 94–72	2–2	23 – Oglesby	11 – Oglesby	5 – Tied	Mabee Center (2,513); Tulsa, OK
November 18, 2023*; 7:00 p.m., KGEB		Tulsa; PSO Mayor’s Cup	W 93–87	3–2	25 – Cooper	11 – Udoumoh	5 – Cooper	Mabee Center (2,992); Tulsa, OK
November 22, 2023*; 1:00 p.m., ESPN+		at UT Rio Grande Valley	W 72–63	4–2	16 – Tied	12 – Oglesby	5 – Cooper	UTRGV Fieldhouse (427); Edinburg, TX
November 29, 2023*; 11:00 a.m., LHN		at No. 10 Texas	L 74–112	4–3	23 – Jones	8 – Udoumoh	7 – Cooper	Moody Center (7,211); Austin, TX
December 11, 2023*; 7:00 p.m., SLN		Oklahoma Wesleyan	W 112–48	5–3	29 – Oglesby	12 – Oglesby	5 – Baldwin	Mabee Center (1,397); Tulsa, OK
December 14, 2023*; 7:00 p.m., SLN		USAO	W 94–67	6–3	22 – Jones	14 – Oglesby	6 – Cooper	Mabee Center (1,826); Tulsa, OK
December 18, 2023*; 6:30 p.m., ESPN+		at No. 12 Kansas State	L 59–102	6–4	15 – Udoumoh	10 – Udoumoh	3 – Cooper	Bramlage Coliseum (2,935); Manhattan, KS
December 20, 2023*; 6:00 p.m., ESPN+		at Wichita State	W 76–74	7–4	20 – Oglesby	10 – Udoumoh	4 – Weinrich	Charles Koch Arena (1,435); Wichita, KS
December 29, 2023; 7:00 p.m., KGEB		Kansas City	W 76–61	8–4 (1–0)	20 – Jones	9 – Oglesby	4 – Tied	Mabee Center (1,335); Tulsa, OK
December 31, 2023; 2:00 p.m., SLN		Denver	W 95–64	9–4 (2–0)	20 – Jones	18 – Udoumoh	6 – Cooper	Mabee Center (1,492); Tulsa, OK
January 3, 2024*; 7:00 p.m., KGEB		Northern Colorado; Big Sky/Summit League Challenge	W 81–80	10–4	18 – Oglesby	6 – Udoumoh	4 – Udoumoh	Mabee Center (1,148); Tulsa, OK
January 6, 2024*; 4:00 p.m., ESPN+		at Sacramento State; Big Sky/Summit League Challenge	W 56–51	11–4	18 – Jones	13 – Cooper	4 – Cooper	Hornets Nest (505); Sacramento, CA
January 11, 2024; 7:00 p.m., SLN		at South Dakota	W 91–78	12–4 (3–0)	37 – Jones	8 – Udoumoh	6 – Cooper	Sanford Coyote Sports Center (1,461); Vermillion, SD
January 13, 2024; 12:00 p.m., SLN		at St. Thomas (MN)	L 72–73	12–5 (3–1)	20 – Cooper	12 – Udoumoh	3 – Cooper	Schoenecker Arena (360); St. Paul, MN
January 18, 2024; 7:00 p.m., SLN		North Dakota	W 71–55	13–5 (4–1)	17 – Oglesby	13 – Udoumoh	3 – Cooper	Mabee Center (1,074); Tulsa, OK
January 20, 2024; 12:00 p.m., SLN		North Dakota State	W 84–75	14–5 (5–1)	23 – Udoumoh	10 – Weinrich	7 – Cooper	Mabee Center (1,327); Tulsa, OK
January 25, 2024; 7:00 p.m., SLN		at Omaha	W 88–78	15–5 (6–1)	19 – Cooper	14 – Udoumoh	3 – Tied	Baxter Arena (374); Omaha, NE
January 28, 2024; 3:00 p.m., CBSSN		at South Dakota State	L 80–96	15–6 (6–2)	23 – Oglesby	6 – Tied	6 – Cooper	Frost Arena (2,042); Brookings, SD
February 3, 2024; 2:00 p.m., SLN		at Denver	L 92–102	15–7 (6–3)	32 – Jones	11 – Udoumoh	3 – Tied	Hamilton Gymnasium (322); Denver, CO
February 8, 2024; 7:00 p.m., SLN		St. Thomas (MN)	W 80–73	16–7 (7–3)	17 – Oglesby	9 – Oglesby	5 – Tramble	Mabee Center (764); Tulsa, OK
February 10, 2024; 2:00 p.m., KGEB		South Dakota State	L 77–103	16–8 (7–4)	26 – Jones	5 – Oglesby	5 – Cooper	Mabee Center (1,185); Tulsa, OK
February 15, 2024; 7:00 p.m., SLN		at North Dakota State	L 73–83	16–9 (7–5)	23 – Jones	9 – Udoumoh	4 – Robinson	Scheels Center (790); Fargo, ND
February 17, 2024; 1:00 p.m., SLN		at North Dakota	W 102–57	17–9 (8–5)	30 – Cooper	13 – Udoumoh	4 – Cooper	Betty Engelstad Sioux Center (1,315); Grand Forks, ND
February 22, 2024; 7:00 p.m., SLN		Omaha	W 87–78	18–9 (9–5)	21 – Cooper	13 – Udoumoh	3 – Tied	Mabee Center (967); Tulsa, OK
February 24, 2024; 2:00 p.m., KGEB		South Dakota	W 77–63	19–9 (10–5)	18 – Oglesby	8 – Tied	4 – Tied	Mabee Center (1,097); Tulsa, OK
March 2, 2024; 2:00 p.m., SLN		at Kansas City	W 94–56	20–9 (11–5)	22 – Oglesby	8 – Weinrich	10 – Robinson	Swinney Recreation Center (605); Kansas City, MO
Summit League women's tournament (1–1)
March 10, 2024; 12:30 p.m., SLN	(3)	vs. (6) North Dakota; Quarterfinals	W 91–68	21–9	27 – Oglesby	14 – Udoumoh	4 – Tied	Denny Sanford Premier Center (8,068); Sioux Falls, SD
March 11, 2024; 3:00 p.m., CBSSN	(3)	vs. (2) North Dakota State; Semifinals	L 66–75	21–10	21 – Udoumoh	12 – Udoumoh	6 – Cooper	Denny Sanford Premier Center (8,107); Sioux Falls, SD
National Invitational Tournament (0–1)
March 21, 2024; 7:00 p.m.		Grambling State; Round 1	L 91–93	21–11	22 – Tied	13 – Udoumoh	8 – Cooper	Mabee Center (2,591); Tulsa, OK
*Non-conference game. ^{#}Rankings from AP Poll. (#) Tournament seedings in parentheses. All times are in Central Time.

== See also ==
- 2023–24 Oral Roberts Golden Eagles men's basketball team
