= 2023–24 South Dakota Coyotes women's basketball team =

American college basketball season

2023–24 South Dakota Coyotes women's basketball

WNIT, Super 16
- Conference: Summit League
- Record: 23–13 (9–7 The Summit)
- Head coach: Kayla Karius (2nd season)
- Assistant coaches: Mike Jewett; Aaron Horn; Taylor Ignoto
- Home arena: Sanford Coyote Sports Center

2023–24 Summit League women's basketball standings
	Conf.				Overall
Team	W		L	PCT	W		L	PCT
South Dakota State †	16	–	0	1.000	27	–	6	.818
North Dakota State	13	–	3	.813	22	–	12	.647
Oral Roberts	11	–	5	.688	21	–	11	.656
South Dakota	9	–	7	.563	23	–	13	.639
St. Thomas*	7	–	9	.438	15	–	16	.484
North Dakota	5	–	11	.313	9	–	21	.300
Denver	5	–	11	.313	8	–	22	.267
Kansas City	3	–	13	.188	12	–	20	.375
Omaha	3	–	13	.188	8	–	23	.258
† 2024 Summit League tournament winner * Ineligible for the 2024 NCAA tournament due to transition from Division III

The 2023–24 South Dakota Coyotes women's basketball team represented the University of South Dakota in the 2023–24 NCAA Division I women's basketball season. The Coyotes, led by second-year head coach Kayla Karius, competed in the Summit League. They played home games in Sanford Coyote Sports Center in Vermillion, South Dakota.

== Previous season ==
The Coyotes finished the 2022–23 season 14–16, 10–8 in Summit League play, to finish in fourth place. As the No. 4 seed in the Summit League tournament, they lost in the quarterfinals to Oral Roberts.

== Offseason ==
=== Departures ===
South Dakota departures
Name	Num	Pos.	Height	Year	Hometown	Reason for departure
Macy Guebert	3	G	5' 8"	Senior	Apple Valley, MN	Graduated
Jeniah Ugofsky	30	F	5' 10"	Senior	Harrisburg, SD	Graduated
Allison Peplowski	35	F	6' 1"	Senior	Williamston, MI	Graduated

=== Incoming ===
South Dakota incoming transfers
Name	Num	Pos.	Height	Year	Hometown	Previous school
Tori DePerry	12	F	5' 11"	GS Senior	Shawano, WI	Saginaw Valley State
Kendall Holmes	35	G	5' 11"	Junior	Plainfield, IL	DePaul

==== Recruiting ====
There was no recruiting class of 2023.

== Roster ==
2023–24 South Dakota Coyotes women's basketball team
Players
Coaches

Pos.	#	Name	Height	Year	Previous school	Hometown
G	0	Olivia Kieffer	5 ft 10 in (1.78 m)	Fr	Rapid City Christian	Rapid City, SD
G	2	Nicole Avila-Ambrosi	5 ft 8 in (1.73 m)	Jr	Millard North; California Baptist	Omaha, NE
G	3	Coral Mason	5 ft 10 in (1.78 m)	Fr	Viborg-Hurley	Hurley, SD
F	10	Morgan Hansen	6 ft 0 in (1.83 m)	RS Sr	Lincoln	Sioux Falls, SD
G	11	Addison Klosterbuer	5 ft 11 in (1.8 m)	Fr	Central Lyon	Little Rock, IA
F	12	Tori DePerry	6 ft 0 in (1.83 m)	GS	Shawano Community; Saginaw Valley State	Shawano, WI
F	20	Carley Duffney	5 ft 10 in (1.78 m)	RS So	Preble	Green Bay, WI
G	21	Grace Larkins	5 ft 9 in (1.75 m)	Jr	Southeast Polk	Altoona, IA
G	22	Joy Bergstrom	5 ft 9 in (1.75 m)	RS Fr	Saint Viator	Mount Prospect, IL
C	23	Natalie Mazurek	6 ft 2 in (1.88 m)	RS So	Eden Prairie	Eden Prairie, MN
C	24	Walker Demers	6 ft 1 in (1.85 m)	Fr	Grafton	Grafton, ND
G	25	Cassidy Carson	6 ft 1 in (1.85 m)	So	Eastview	Eagan, MN
G	32	Madison Grange	5 ft 11 in (1.8 m)	Sr	Skyline; Utah Valley	Holladay, UT
F	33	Sophie Haydon	6 ft 1 in (1.85 m)	Jr	Minnetonka; George Washington	Shorewood, MN
G	34	Avery Broughton	5 ft 11 in (1.8 m)	Fr	Corsica-Stickney	Corsica, SD
G	35	Kendall Holmes	5 ft 10 in (1.78 m)	Jr	Benet Academy; DePaul	Plainfield, IL
F	41	Alexi Hempe	6 ft 0 in (1.83 m)	RS Jr	TPLS Christian Academy	Fredericksburg, VA

Head coach

- Kayla Karius (Green Bay)

Assistant coach(es)

- Mike Jewett (Augustana (SD))
- Gabby Johnson (Thomas More College)
- Taylor Ignoto (Washburn)

Legend

- (C) Team captain
- (S) Suspended
- (I) Ineligible
- (W) Walk-on
- Injured
- Current redshirt

Roster
Last update: October 6, 2024

== Schedule and results ==
Date time, TV	Rank^{#}	Opponent^{#}	Result	Record	High points	High rebounds	High assists	Site (attendance) city, state
Regular season
November 6, 2023*; 5:30 p.m., SLN		Northern State	W 85–57	1–0	14 – Holmes	5 – Holmes	5 – Larkins	Sanford Coyote Sports Center (2,091); Vermillion, SD
November 10, 2023*; 11:30 a.m., FloSports		at No. 22 Creighton	L 55–81	1–1	13 – DePerry	13 – Larkins	4 – Duffney	D. J. Sokol Arena (1,539); Omaha, NE
November 14, 2023*; 7:00 p.m., MidcoSN2/SLN		Northern Colorado	W 72–59	2–1	17 – Larkins	7 – Larkins	5 – Larkins	Sanford Coyote Sports Center (1,374); Vermillion, SD
November 18, 2023*; 6:30 p.m., FloSports		vs. DePaul; Battle 4 Atlantis quarterfinals	W 83–71	3–1	23 – Larkins	6 – tied	8 – Larkins	Imperial Arena (422); Nassau, Bahamas
November 19, 2023*; 1:30 p.m., FloSports		vs. Michigan; Battle 4 Atlantis semifinals	L 52–70	3–2	16 – DePerry	5 – tied	4 – Larkins	Imperial Arena (222); Nassau, Bahamas
November 20, 2023*; 1:30 p.m., ESPNU		vs. Arizona; Battle 4 Atlantis 3rd-place game	L 52–61	3–3	16 – Demers	7 – Demers	3 – tied	Imperial Arena; Nassau, Bahamas
November 25, 2023*; 1:00 p.m., MidcoSN/SLN		vs. South Carolina State	W 72–52	4–3	16 – Larkins	8 – Larkins	6 – Larkins	Sanford Pentagon (1,808); Sioux Falls, SD
November 29, 2023*; 6:00 p.m., SLN		Northern Iowa	W 84–65	5–3	28 – Larkins	11 – Larkins	6 – Larkins	Sanford Coyote Sports Center (1,612); Vermillion, SD
December 3, 2023*; 8:00 p.m., ESPN+		at Loyola Marymount	W 78–73 ^{OT}	6–3	25 – Larkins	5 – tied	4 – Avila-Ambrosi	Gersten Pavilion (218); Los Angeles, CA
December 10, 2023*; 1:00 p.m., SLN		Dickinson State	W 108–46	7–3	18 – Mazurek	7 – Larkins	6 – Kieffer	Sanford Coyote Sports Center (1,483); Vermillion, SD
December 13, 2023*; 7:00 p.m., SLN		Mount Marty	W 100–35	8–3	16 – Holmes	7 – tied	7 – Kieffer	Sanford Coyote Sports Center (1,336); Vermillion, SD
December 16, 2023*; 1:00 p.m., ESPN+		at UT Martin	W 80–74 ^{OT}	9–3	18 – Larkins	6 – DePerry	8 – Larkins	Skyhawk Arena (758); Martin, TN
December 20, 2023*; 6:00 p.m., ESPN+		Bradley	W 68–47	10–3	20 – Larkins	8 – tied	5 – Larkins	Sanford Coyote Sports Center (1,487); Vermillion, SD
December 29, 2023; 7:00 p.m., SLN		North Dakota State	L 69–84	10–4 (0–1)	17 – Larkins	4 – tied	4 – Larkins	Sanford Coyote Sports Center (1,818); Vermillion, SD
December 31, 2023; 2:00 p.m., SLN		at Omaha	W 77–71 ^{OT}	11–4 (1–1)	22 – Larkins	12 – Larkins	5 – Larkins	Baxter Arena (706); Omaha, NE
January 3, 2024*; 8:00 p.m., ESPN+		at Montana; Big Sky–Summit League Challenge	L 61–74	11–5	15 – Holmes	14 – Larkins	9 – Larkins	Dahlberg Arena (1,944); Missoula, MT
January 6, 2024*; 1:00 p.m., SLN		Idaho State; Big Sky–Summit League Challenge	W 73–47	12–5	19 – Larkins	11 – Larkins	6 – Larkins	Sanford Coyote Sports Center (1,479); Vermillion, SD
January 11, 2024; 7:00 p.m., SLN		Oral Roberts	L 78–91	12–6 (1–2)	21 – Holmes	8 – Larkins	10 – Larkins	Sanford Coyote Sports Center (1,461); Vermillion, SD
January 18, 2024; 7:00 p.m., SLN		at St. Thomas (MN)	W 63–61	13–6 (2–2)	19 – Holmes	7 – Mazurek	5 – Duffney	Schoenecker Arena (445); St. Paul, MN
January 20, 2024; 6:00 p.m., MidcoSN/SLN		at South Dakota State	L 55–73	13–7 (2–3)	18 – Larkins	10 – Mazurek	4 – Duffney	Frost Arena (3,671); Brookings, SD
January 25, 2024; 7:00 p.m., MidcoSN/SLN		Denver	W 78–70	14–7 (3–3)	22 – Holmes	7 – Hempe	5 – Holmes	Sanford Coyote Sports Center (1,577); Vermillion, SD
January 27, 2024; 2:00 p.m., SLN		Kansas City	W 72–62	15–7 (4–3)	21 – Larkins	8 – Larkins	4 – Larkins	Sanford Coyote Sports Center (2,606); Vermillion, SD
February 1, 2024; 7:00 p.m., MidcoSN2/SLN		at North Dakota	W 69–53	16–7 (5–3)	15 – Holmes	6 – tied	6 – Larkins	Betty Engelstad Sioux Center (1,366); Grand Forks, ND
February 3, 2024; 6:00 p.m., MidcoSN2/SLN		South Dakota State	L 55–70	16–8 (5–4)	17 – Mazurek	7 – Larkins	6 – Larkins	Sanford Coyote Sports Center (3,316); Vermillion, SD
February 8, 2024; 7:00 p.m., SLN		at Denver	W 78–48	17–8 (6–4)	17 – Larkins	9 – Larkins	4 – Duffney	Hamilton Gymnasium (348); Denver, CO
February 15, 2024; 6:00 p.m., SLN		Omaha	L 67–77	17–9 (6–5)	21 – Holmes	12 – Larkins	4 – Larkins	Sanford Coyote Sports Center (1,397); Vermillion, SD
February 17, 2024; 6:00 p.m., MidcoSN/SLN		St. Thomas (MN)	W 75–61	18–9 (7–5)	15 – Holmes	10 – Mazurek	8 – Larkins	Sanford Coyote Sports Center (1,702); Vermillion, SD
February 22, 2024; 7:00 p.m., SLN		at Kansas City	W 74–60	19–9 (8–5)	19 – tied	8 – Mazurek	5 – tied	Swinney Recreation Center (470); Kansas City, MO
February 24, 2024; 2:00 p.m., SLN		at Oral Roberts	L 63–77	19–10 (8–6)	17 – Holmes	9 – Larkins	5 – Larkins	Mabee Center (1,097); Tulsa, OK
February 29, 2024; 7:00 p.m., WDAY Xtra/SLN		at North Dakota State	L 53–63	19–11 (8–7)	22 – Larkins	7 – Demers	4 – Larkins	Scheels Center (1,035); Fargo, ND
March 2, 2024; 2:00 p.m., SLN		North Dakota	W 65–54	20–11 (9–7)	20 – Larkins	11 – Larkins	7 – Larkins	Sanford Coyote Sports Center (1,792); Vermillion, SD
Summit League women's tournament
March 10, 2024; 3:30 p.m., SLN	(4)	vs. (5) St. Thomas (MN); Quarterfinals	W 70–57	21–11	29 – Larkins	12 – Mazurek	4 – Larkins	Denny Sanford Premier Center; Sioux Falls, SD
March 11, 2024; 12:30 p.m., CBSSN	(4)	vs. (1) South Dakota State; Semifinals	L 63–76	21–12	16 – Avila-Ambrosi	4 – tied	4 – Mazurek	Denny Sanford Premier Center; Sioux Falls, SD
WNIT
March 22, 2024*; 7:00 p.m., SLN		UC Riverside; First round	W 72–57	22–12	15 – Duffney	11 – Larkins	7 – Larkins	Sanford Coyote Sports Center (1,465); Vermillion, SD
March 26, 2024*; 7:00 p.m., SLN		Northern Arizona; Second round	W 79–65	23–12	34 – Larkins	12 – Larkins	3 – DePerry	Sanford Coyote Sports Center (1,580); Vermillion, SD
April 1, 2024*; 7:30 p.m., MW Network		at Wyoming; Super 16	L 52–84	23–13	20 – Duffney	8 – Larkins	4 – Larkins	Arena-Auditorium (1,580); Laramie, WY
*Non-conference game. ^{#}Rankings from AP poll. (#) Tournament seedings in parentheses. All times are in Central.

== See also ==
- 2023–24 South Dakota Coyotes men's basketball team
