= 2024 Summit League women's basketball tournament =

American college basketball postseason tournament

- Classification: Division I
- Season: 2023–24
- Teams: 9
- Site: Denny Sanford Premier Center; Sioux Falls, South Dakota
- Champions: South Dakota State (11th title)
- Winning coach: Aaron Johnston (11th title)
- MVP: Paige Meyer (South Dakota State)
- Attendance: 36,504
- Television: Summit League Network, CBSSN

2023–24 Summit League women's basketball standings
	Conf.				Overall
Team	W		L	PCT	W		L	PCT
South Dakota State †	16	–	0	1.000	27	–	6	.818
North Dakota State	13	–	3	.813	22	–	12	.647
Oral Roberts	11	–	5	.688	21	–	11	.656
South Dakota	9	–	7	.563	23	–	13	.639
St. Thomas*	7	–	9	.438	15	–	16	.484
North Dakota	5	–	11	.313	9	–	21	.300
Denver	5	–	11	.313	8	–	22	.267
Kansas City	3	–	13	.188	12	–	20	.375
Omaha	3	–	13	.188	8	–	23	.258
† 2024 Summit League tournament winner * Ineligible for the 2024 NCAA tournament due to transition from Division III

The 2024 Summit League women's basketball tournament was the postseason women's college basketball tournament for the Summit League for the 2023–24 season. All tournament games were played at the Denny Sanford Premier Center in Sioux Falls, South Dakota, from March 8–12, 2024.

== Seeds ==
All nine conference teams will participate in the tournament. Teams will be seeded by conference record. If teams are tied at the conclusion of conference play, the following tiebreakers will be used in this order:

1. Head-to-head record
2. Record against the highest-seeded team not involved in the tie, going down through the standings until the tie is broken

If St. Thomas were to win the tournament (since the Tommies are ineligible for the NCAA tournament until 2026), the NCAA tournament berth would go to the highest seeded team that is eligible for postseason play.

Seed	School	Conf. record	Tiebreaker(s)
1	South Dakota State	16–0	
2	North Dakota State	13–3	
3	Oral Roberts	11–5	
4	South Dakota	9–7	
5	St. Thomas	7–9	
6	North Dakota	5–11	2–0 vs. Denver
7	Denver	5–11	0–2 vs. North Dakota
8	Kansas City	3–13	2–0 vs. Omaha
9	Omaha	3–13	0–2 vs. Kansas City

== Schedule and results ==
Game	Time	Matchup	Score	Television
First Round - Friday, March 8
1	4:30 pm	No. 8 Kansas City vs. No. 9 Omaha	61–55	MidcoSN/SLN
Quarterfinals – Saturday, March 9
2	12:30 pm	No. 2 North Dakota State vs. No. 7 Denver	72–60	MidcoSN/SLN
3	3:00 pm	No. 1 South Dakota State vs. No. 9 Omaha	66–53	MidcoSN/SLN
Quarterfinals – Sunday, March 10
4	12:30 pm	No. 4 South Dakota vs. No. 5 St. Thomas	70–57	MidcoSN/SLN
5	3:00 pm	No. 3 Oral Roberts vs. No. 6 North Dakota	91–68	MidcoSN/SLN
Semifinals - Monday, March 11
6	12:30 pm	No. 1 South Dakota State vs. No. 4 South Dakota	76–63	CBSSN
7	3:00 pm	No. 2 North Dakota State vs. No. 3 Oral Roberts	75–66	CBSSN
Final – Tuesday, March 12
8	3:30 pm	No. 1 South Dakota State vs. No. 2 North Dakota State	67–54	CBSSN
*Game times in CST. Rankings denote tournament seed. Reference:

== Bracket ==
First Round; March 8 MidcoSN/SLN
8	Kansas City	55
9	Omaha	61

Quarterfinals; March 9 & 10; MidcoSN/SLN
1	South Dakota State	66
9	Omaha	53
4	South Dakota	70
5	St. Thomas	57
2	North Dakota State	72
7	Denver	60
3	Oral Roberts	91
6	North Dakota	68

Semifinals; March 11; CBS Sports Network
1	South Dakota State	76
4	South Dakota	63
2	North Dakota State	75
3	Oral Roberts	66

Championship; March 12; CBS Sports Network
1	South Dakota State	67
2	North Dakota State	54

== All-Tournament Team ==
The following players were named to the All-Tournament Team:

Player	School
Paige Meyer (MVP)	South Dakota State
Brooklyn Meyer	South Dakota State
Madison Mathiowetz	South Dakota State
Heaven Hamling	North Dakota State
Elle Evans	North Dakota State
