= 2023–24 Denver Pioneers women's basketball team =

American college basketball season

2023–24 Denver Pioneers women's basketball
- Conference: Summit League
- Record: 8–22 (5–11 The Summit)
- Head coach: Doshia Woods (4th season)
- Associate head coach: Lindsay Werntz
- Assistant coaches: Sarah Miles; Marquelle Dent
- Home arena: Hamilton Gymnasium

2023–24 Summit League women's basketball standings
	Conf.				Overall
Team	W		L	PCT	W		L	PCT
South Dakota State †	16	–	0	1.000	27	–	6	.818
North Dakota State	13	–	3	.813	22	–	12	.647
Oral Roberts	11	–	5	.688	21	–	11	.656
South Dakota	9	–	7	.563	23	–	13	.639
St. Thomas*	7	–	9	.438	15	–	16	.484
North Dakota	5	–	11	.313	9	–	21	.300
Denver	5	–	11	.313	8	–	22	.267
Kansas City	3	–	13	.188	12	–	20	.375
Omaha	3	–	13	.188	8	–	23	.258
† 2024 Summit League tournament winner * Ineligible for the 2024 NCAA tournament due to transition from Division III

The 2023–24 Denver Pioneers women's basketball team represented the University of Denver in the 2023–24 NCAA Division I women's basketball season. The Pioneers, led by fourth-year head coach Doshia Woods, competed in the Summit League. They played their home games at Hamilton Gymnasium.

The Pioneers finished the season 8–22, 5–11 in Summit League play, to finish in a tie for sixth place. They were defeated by North Dakota State in the quarterfinals of the Summit League tournament.

== Previous season ==
The Pioneers finished the 2022–23 season 12–18, 8–10 in Summit League play, to finish in a three-way tie for fifth place. Due to a tiebreaker, they were the No. 7 seed in the Summit League tournament; they lost in the first round to Kansas City.

== Offseason ==
=== Departures ===
Denver departures
Name	Num	Pos.	Height	Year	Hometown	Reason for departure
Sophia Zulich	1	F	5' 11"	(redshirt) Junior	Ontario, Canada	TBD
Mikayla Brandon	14	F	6' 1"	GS senior	Bourbonnais, IL	Graduated
Ally Haar	20	G	5' 6"	GS senior	West Chester, OH	Graduated
Mikenzie Jones	22	F	6' 1"	Freshman	Aurora, CO	Transferred to UMass
Tsimba Malonga	32	G	5' 7"	GS senior	Bolingbrook, IL	Graduated
Cheyenne Forney	34	F	6' 3"	Junior	Riverside, CA	Transferred to Arkansas State

=== Incoming ===
Denver incoming transfers
Name	Num	Pos.	Height	Year	Hometown	Previous school
Laila McLeod	1	G	6' 0"	Sophomore	Dallas, TX	Grand Canyon
Lauren With	32	F	6' 2"	GS senior	Hartland, WI	Indianapolis

==== Recruiting ====
There was no recruiting class for 2023.

== Roster ==
2023–24 Denver Pioneers women's basketball team
Players
Coaches

Pos.	#	Name	Height	Year	Previous school	Hometown
G	0	Emma Smith	5 ft 7 in (1.7 m)	So	Vestavia Hills HS	Vestavia Hills, AL
F	1	Laila McLeod	6 ft 0 in (1.83 m)	So	Bella Vista College Prep; Grand Canyon	Dallas, TX
G	2	Angelina Robles	5 ft 5 in (1.65 m)	So	The Bishop's School	San Diego, CA
G	3	Madelyn Atkins	5 ft 8 in (1.73 m)	So	Beebe HS	Beebe, AR
G	4	Jordan Jones	6 ft 0 in (1.83 m)	So	Cheyenne East HS	Cheyenne, WY
G	11	Emily Counsel	6 ft 3 in (1.91 m)	Sr	Willetton Sr. HS	Perth, Australia
G	12	Joclyen Wyatt	5 ft 8 in (1.73 m)	Jr	Silas HS	Tacoma, WA
G	13	Emari Doby	5 ft 10 in (1.78 m)	Fr	Shawnee Heights HS	Topeka, KS
G	15	Alaisha Brown	5 ft 10 in (1.78 m)	Fr	James Bowie HS	Arlington, TX
G	20	Reagan Pahl	5 ft 6 in (1.68 m)	Fr	Cedarburg HS	Cedarburg, WI
F	21	Makayla Minnett	6 ft 3 in (1.91 m)	GS	Pearl City HS; Howard	Chicago, IL
F	32	Lauren With	6 ft 2 in (1.88 m)	GS	Arrowhead HS; Indianapolis	Hartland, WI
G	33	Mary Wilson	5 ft 10 in (1.78 m)	Jr	Center Grove HS	Greenwood, IN
F	45	Shira Hagag	5 ft 11 in (1.8 m)	So	Hof Hasharon	Netanya, Israel

Head coach

- Doshia Woods (Western Illinois)

Assistant coach(es)

- Lindsay Werntz (Purdue Fort Wayne)
- Velaida Harris (West Virginia)
- Marquelle Dent (Wyoming)

Legend

- (C) Team captain
- (S) Suspended
- (I) Ineligible
- (W) Walk-on
- Injured
- Current redshirt

Roster
Last update: 2024-05-18

== Schedule and results ==
Date time, TV	Rank^{#}	Opponent^{#}	Result	Record	High points	High rebounds	High assists	Site (attendance) city, state
Regular season
November 6, 2023*; 5:00 p.m., MW Network		at Air Force	L 63–65	0–1	22 – Smith	13 – Jones	3 – 3 tied	Clune Arena (579); Colorado Springs, CO
November 10, 2023*; 5:00 p.m., ESPN+		at North Alabama	W 67–51	1–1	16 – Minett	11 – Smith	6 – Jones	CB&S Bank Arena (1,072); Florence, AL
November 14, 2023*; 6:00 p.m., Altitude2/SLN		Wyoming	L 41–58	1–2	15 – Counsel	6 – 2 tied	3 – Smith	Hamilton Gymnasium (615); Denver, CO
November 24, 2023*; 1:00 p.m., SLN		Central Arkansas; Denver Classic	L 84–90	1–3	29 – Jones	9 – 2 tied	7 – Robles	Hamilton Gymnasium (352); Denver, CO
November 25, 2023*; 1:00 p.m., SLN		South Alabama; Denver Classic	L 53–62	1–4	17 – Jones	16 – Minett	3 – Smith	Hamilton Gymnasium (612); Denver, CO
November 30, 2023*; 7:00 p.m., ESPN+		at Loyola Marymount	L 61–79	1–5	20 – Smith	9 – Minett	5 – Robles	Gersten Pavilion (249); Los Angeles, CA
December 2, 2023*; 3:00 p.m., ESPN+		at UC Irvine	L 47–50	1–6	18 – Counsel	9 – Jones	3 – Jones	Bren Events Center (587); Irvine, CA
December 9, 2023*; 1:00 p.m., SLN		Stetson	W 74–52	2–6	21 – Counsel	8 – With	7 – Smith	Hamilton Gymnasium (273); Denver, CO
December 14, 2023*; 6:00 p.m., ESPN+		at Texas State	L 46–72	2–7	13 – Counsel	8 – Minett	3 – Smith	Strahan Arena (771); San Marcos, TX
December 19, 2023*; 6:00 p.m., SLN		Colorado Christian	W 81–59	3–7	15 – 2 tied	9 – Jones	5 – Robles	Hamilton Gymnasium (260); Denver, CO
December 21, 2023*; 6:00 p.m., SLN		Saint Mary's	L 56–61	3–8	24 – Smith	8 – With	4 – Smith	Hamilton Gymnasium (230); Denver, CO
December 29, 2023; 6:00 p.m., SLN		Omaha	W 81–63	4–8 (1–0)	23 – Jones	16 – Jones	4 – 4 tied	Hamilton Gymnasium (344); Denver, CO
December 31, 2023; 1:00 p.m., SLN		at Oral Roberts	L 64–95	4–9 (1–1)	14 – Robles	5 – 3 tied	4 – Robles	Mabee Center (1,492); Tulsa, OK
January 3, 2023*; 5:00 p.m., Altitude/SLN		Idaho; Big Sky–Summit Challenge	L 51–60	4–10	23 – Jones	12 – Jones	2 – 2 tied	Hamilton Gymnasium (302); Denver, CO
January 6, 2024*; 2:00 p.m., ESPN+		at Northern Colorado; Big Sky–Summit Challenge	L 56–59	4–11	20 – Jones	14 – Minett	5 – Jones	Bank of Colorado Arena (693); Greeley, CO
January 13, 2024; 1:00 p.m., SLN		at South Dakota State	L 50–68	4–12 (1–2)	13 – Smith	11 – Minett	7 – Jones	Frost Arena (1,226); Brookings, SD
January 18, 2024; 6:00 p.m., SLN		North Dakota State	L 63–84	4–13 (1–3)	18 – Jones	6 – Smith	4 – Smith	Hamilton Gymnasium (268); Denver, CO
January 20, 2024; 1:00 p.m., SLN		North Dakota	L 68–78	4–14 (1–4)	21 – Counsel	8 – Smith	5 – 2 tied	Hamilton Gymnasium (545); Denver, CO
January 25, 2024; 6:00 p.m., SLN		at South Dakota	L 70–78	4–15 (1–5)	18 – Jones	10 – Jones	6 – Jones	Sanford Coyote Sports Center (1,577); Vermillion, SD
January 27, 2024; 6:00 p.m., SLN		at Omaha	L 77–80	4–16 (1–6)	28 – Robles	18 – Minett	5 – Robles	Baxter Arena (431); Omaha, NE
February 1, 2024; 6:00 p.m., SLN		Kansas City	W 65–50	5–16 (2–6)	20 – Jones	12 – Minett	4 – 2 tied	Hamilton Gymnasium (245); Denver, CO
February 3, 2024; 1:00 p.m., SLN		Oral Roberts	W 102–92	6 16 (3–6)	24 – Jones	16 – Minett	9 – Smith	Hamilton Gymnasium (322); Denver, CO
February 8, 2024; 6:00 p.m., SLN		South Dakota	L 48–78	6–17 (3–7)	14 – Robles	10 – Jones	4 – Robles	Hamilton Gymnasium (348); Denver, CO
February 10, 2024; 11:00 a.m., SLN		at St. Thomas (MN)	W 67–61	7–17 (4–7)	21 – 2 tied	9 – 2 tied	6 – Robles	Schoenecker Arena (345); St. Paul, MN
February 15, 2024; 6:00 p.m., SLN		at North Dakota	L 65–75	7–18 (4–8)	20 – Jones	12 – Minett	5 – 2 tied	Betty Engelstad Sioux Center (1,232); Grand Forks, ND
February 17, 2024; 12:00 p.m., SLN		at North Dakota State	L 65–86	7–19 (4–9)	24 – Jones	4 – Minett	5 – Jones	Scheels Center (1,255); Fargo, ND
February 22, 2024; 6:00 p.m., SLN		South Dakota State	L 64–73	7–20 (4–10)	21 – Jones	5 – Jones	6 – Smith	Hamilton Gymnasium (262); Denver, CO
February 29, 2024; 6:00 p.m., SLN		at Kansas City	W 74–60	8–20 (5–10)	16 – Smith	11 – 2 tied	7 – Jones	Swinney Recreation Center (771); Kansas City, MO
March 2, 2024; 3:00 p.m., SLN		St. Thomas (MN)	L 68–79	8–21 (5–11)	22 – Jones	10 – Jones	4 – Smith	Hamilton Gymnasium (517); Denver, CO
Summit League women's tournament
March 9, 2024; 11:30 a.m., SLN	(7)	vs. (2) North Dakota State; Quarterfinals	L 60–72	8–22	16 – Jones	6 – Jones	4 – Jones	Denny Sanford Premier Center; Sioux Falls, SD
*Non-conference game. ^{#}Rankings from AP poll. (#) Tournament seedings in parentheses. All times are in Mountain.

== See also ==
- 2023–24 Denver Pioneers men's basketball team
