= 2023–24 Summit League women's basketball season =

- League: NCAA Division I
- Sport: Basketball
- Teams: 9
- TV partner(s): Summit League Network, CBS Sports Network

Regular season
- Regular season champion: South Dakota State
- Season MVP: Brooklyn Meyer, South Dakota State

Summit League tournament
- Champions: South Dakota State
- Runners-up: North Dakota State
- Tournament MVP: Paige Meyer, South Dakota State

Summit League women's basketball seasons
- ← 2022–23 2024–25 →

2023–24 Summit League women's basketball standings
	Conf.				Overall
Team	W		L	PCT	W		L	PCT
South Dakota State †	16	–	0	1.000	27	–	6	.818
North Dakota State	13	–	3	.813	22	–	12	.647
Oral Roberts	11	–	5	.688	21	–	11	.656
South Dakota	9	–	7	.563	23	–	13	.639
St. Thomas*	7	–	9	.438	15	–	16	.484
North Dakota	5	–	11	.313	9	–	21	.300
Denver	5	–	11	.313	8	–	22	.267
Kansas City	3	–	13	.188	12	–	20	.375
Omaha	3	–	13	.188	8	–	23	.258
† 2024 Summit League tournament winner * Ineligible for the 2024 NCAA tournament due to transition from Division III

The 2023–24 Summit League women's basketball season began non-conference play on November 6, 2023. Conference play started on December 29, 2023. This was the seventeenth season of women's basketball play under the Summit League name and the forty-second overall for the conference.
The Summit League tournament took place from March 8–12, 2024. South Dakota State won the tournament, beating North Dakota State in the tournament final, and advanced to the NCAA tournament. North Dakota State, Oral Roberts, and South Dakota played in the 2024 Women's National Invitation Tournament (WNIT).

== Conference changes ==
Just after the conclusion of the Spring regular season, Western Illinois announced they would be leaving the Summit League on July 1, 2023, and joining the Ohio Valley Conference in all sports except men's soccer (which will join the OVC the following fall). The Leathernecks were the only remaining charter member of the Mid-Continent Conference.

== Preseason ==
The preseason Summit League women's basketball poll was released on October 10, 2023.

=== Preseason poll ===
First place votes in parentheses

1. South Dakota State (27) – 577
2. North Dakota State (5) – 526
3. South Dakota (2) – 485
4. North Dakota – 434
5. Oral Roberts (1) – 357
6. Omaha – 263
7. Denver (1) – 233
8. St. Thomas – 203
9. Kansas City – 174

=== Preseason awards ===
Honor	Recipient
Preseason Player of the Year	Kacie Borowicz, North Dakota
Preseason All-Summit League First Team	Hannah Cooper, Oral Roberts
Preseason All-Summit League First Team	Elle Evans, North Dakota State
Preseason All-Summit League First Team	Heaven Hamling, North Dakota State
Preseason All-Summit League First Team	Grace Larkins, South Dakota
Preseason All-Summit League First Team	Paige Meyer, South Dakota State
Preseason All-Summit League Second Team	Carley Duffney, South Dakota
Preseason All-Summit League Second Team	Makayla Minett, Denver
Preseason All-Summit League Second Team	Tori Nelson, South Dakota State
Preseason All-Summit League Second Team	Emma Smith, Denver
Preseason All-Summit League Second Team	Ruthie Udoumoh, Oral Roberts

== Regular season ==
=== Records against other conferences ===
2023–24 records against non-conference foes as of January 6, 2024:

**Regular season**

Power 7 Conferences	Record
American	2–2
ACC	None
Big East	1–3
Big Ten	0–5
Big 12	0–8
Pac-12	0–2
SEC	0–2
Power 7 Conferences Total	3–22
Other NCAA Division 1 Conferences	Record
America East	None
A-10	None
ASUN	2–1
Big Sky	13–9
Big South	None
Big West	1–2
CAA	None
C-USA	0–1
Horizon	2–1
Independent	1–0
Ivy League	0–1
MAAC	None
MAC	3–1
MEAC	2–0
MVC	4–6
Mountain West	0–4
NEC	None
OVC	3–4
Patriot League	None
SoCon	None
Southland	None
SWAC	2–0
Sun Belt	2–3
WAC	2–0
WCC	2–4
Other Division I Total	39–37
NCAA Division I Total	42–59
NCAA Division II Total	4–0
NCAA Division III Total	3–0
NAIA Total	11–1
NCCAA Total	1–0
Non-Conference Total	63–60

**Post Season**

Power 7 Conferences	Record
American	None
ACC	None
Big East	None
Big Ten	None
Big 12	None
Pac-12	None
SEC	None
Power 7 Conferences Total	0–0
Other NCAA Division 1 Conferences	Record
America East	None
A-10	None
ASUN	None
Big Sky	None
Big South	None
Big West	None
CAA	None
C-USA	None
Horizon	None
Ivy League	None
MAAC	None
MAC	None
MEAC	None
MVC	None
Mountain West	None
NEC	None
OVC	None
Patriot League	None
SoCon	None
Southland	None
SWAC	None
Sun Belt	None
WAC	None
WCC	None
Other Division I Total	0–0
NCAA Division I Total	0–0

=== Record against ranked non-conference opponents ===
This is a list of games against ranked opponents only (rankings from the AP Poll): Summit League teams in Bold

Date	Visitor	Home	Site	Score	Conference record	Ref
Nov 6	No. 22 Creighton	**North Dakota State**†	Sanford Pentagon ● Sioux Falls, SD	**L 52**–75	0–1	
Nov 10	**South Dakota**	No. 22 Creighton	D. J. Sokol Arena ● Omaha, NE	**L 55**–81	0–2	
Nov 20	**South Dakota State**	No. 1 South Carolina	Colonial Life Arena ● Columbia, SC	**L 38**–78	0–3	
Nov 29	**Oral Roberts**	No. 10 Texas	Moody Center ● Austin, TX	**L 74**–112	0–4	
Dec 5	No. 21 Washington State	**South Dakota State**	Frost Arena ● Brookings, SD	**L 64**–69	0–5	
Dec 17	**South Dakota State**	No. 21 Gonzaga	McCarthey Athletic Center ● Spokane, WA	**L 58**–83	0–6	
Dec 18	**Oral Roberts**	No. 12 Kansas State	Bramlage Coliseum ● Manhattan, KS	**L 59**–102	0–7	
Dec 20	**Omaha**	No. 25 TCU	Schollmaier Arena ● Fort Worth, TX	**L 56**–96	0–8	
Dec 21	**South Dakota State**	No. 20 Creighton	D. J. Sokol Arena ● Omaha, NE	**L 46**–58	0–8	
Mar 23	**South Dakota State**	No. 21 Utah†^	McCarthey Athletic Center ● Spokane, WA	**L 54**–68	0–9	

Team rankings are reflective of AP poll when the game was played, not current or final ranking

† denotes game was played on neutral site
^ denotes NCAA tournament game

=== Conference matrix ===
The matrix represents head-to-head matchups within the conference.

	Denver	Kansas City	North Dakota	North Dakota State	Omaha	Oral Roberts	St. Thomas	South Dakota	South Dakota State
vs. Denver	–	0–2	2–0	2–0	1–1	1–1	1–1	2–0	2–0
vs. Kansas City	2–0	–	1–1	2–0	0–2	2–0	2–0	2–0	2–0
vs. North Dakota	0–2	1–1	–	2–0	0–2	2–0	2–0	2–0	2–0
vs. North Dakota State	0–2	0–2	0–2	–	0–2	1–1	0–2	0–2	2–0
vs. Omaha	1–1	2–0	2–0	2–0	–	2–0	1–1	1–1	2–0
vs. Oral Roberts	1–1	0–2	0–2	1–1	0–2	–	1–1	0–2	2–0
vs. St. Thomas	1–1	0–2	0–2	2–0	1–1	1–1	–	2–0	2–0
vs. South Dakota	0–2	0–2	0–2	2–0	1–1	2–0	0–2	–	2–0
vs. South Dakota State	0–2	0–2	0–2	0–2	0–2	0–2	0–2	0–2	–
Total	5–11	3–13	5–11	13–3	3–13	11–5	7–9	9–7	16–0

As of March 2, 2024

=== Points scored ===
Team	For	Against	Difference
Denver	1931	2090	–159
Kansas City	2064	2111	–47
North Dakota	2006	2297	–291
North Dakota State	2565	2328	+237
Omaha	2242	2516	–274
Oral Roberts	2628	2413	+215
St. Thomas	2103	2206	–103
South Dakota	2551	2326	+225
South Dakota State	2428	1985	+443

Through March 30, 2024

=== National Television Games ===
Before the 2023-24 season began, the Summit League announced a new media deal with CBS Sports Network that would show up to 12 regular season games (6 guaranteed men's games) on the network, as well as moving the league's tournament final games to CBSSN. The women's tournament semifinal games will also be broadcast on CBSSN. On October 18, 2023, the Summit League and CBS Sports Network announced the league's 2023-24 slate of games to appear on the network throughout the conference season. Those games and any others that league members will play are listed here.

Summit League members in bold

Date Time (CT)	Road Team	Home team	Final Score	Network
November 20, 2023; 1 PM	**South Dakota**	Arizona	**52**–61	ESPNU
December 31, 2023; 12 PM	**South Dakota State**	**North Dakota**	**SDSU** 74–53	CBSSN
January 28, 2024; 3 PM	**Oral Roberts**	**South Dakota State**	**SDSU** 96–80	CBSSN

== Home attendance ==
Team	Arena	Capacity	Total Games	Average Attendance	Attendance High	Total Attendance	% of Capacity
Denver	Hamilton Gymnasium	2,500	15	366	615; Nov 14 vs. Wyoming	5,495	14.7%
Kansas City	Swinney Recreation Center	1,500	16	559	1,203; Nov 6 vs. Bradley	8,959	37.3%
North Dakota	Betty Engelstad Sioux Center	3,300	15	1,414	2,913; Feb 3 vs. North Dakota St	21,221	42.9%
North Dakota State	Scheels Center	5,460	13	979	2,502; Feb 24 vs. North Dakota	12,736	17.9%
Omaha	Baxter Arena	7,898	12	461	705; Dec 31 vs. South Dakota	5,538	5.8%
Oral Roberts	Mabee Center	10,154	14	1,819	6,358; Nov 9 vs. Friends	25,475	17.9%
St. Thomas	Schoenecker Arena	1,800	14	530	979; Nov 29 vs. Iowa State	7,426	29.5%
South Dakota	Sanford Coyote Sports Center	6,000	15	1,779	3,316; Feb 3 vs. South Dakota St	26,696	29.6%
South Dakota State	Frost Arena	6,500	14	2,088	3,768; Mar 2 vs. North Dakota St	29,237	32.1%

Bold - Exceed capacity
As of March 2, 2024
Does not include exhibition games

== Head coaches ==
Note: Stats shown are before the beginning of the season. Overall and Summit League records are from time at current school.

Team	Head coach	Previous job	Seasons at school	Overall record	Summit record	Summit titles	NCAA tournaments	NCAA Sweet Sixteen	NCAA Championships
Denver	Doshia Woods	Tulane (recruiting coordinator)	4th	29–54 (.349)	18–32 (.360)	0	0	0	0
Kansas City	Dionnah Jackson-Durrett	Texas (Associate head coach)	2nd	9–23 (.281)	3–15 (.167)	0	0	0	0
North Dakota	Mallory Bernhard	North Dakota (assistant)	4th	36–47 (.434)	22–29 (.431)	0	0	0	0
North Dakota State	Jory Collins	Kansas (assistant)	5th	55–58 (.487)	35-33 (.515)	0	0	0	0
Omaha	Carrie Banks	Ohio State (assistant)	4th	29–49 (.372)	15–32 (.319)	0	0	0	0
Oral Roberts	Kelsi Musick	Southwestern Oklahoma State	2nd	12–19 (.387)	8–10 (.444)	0	0	0	0
St. Thomas	Ruth Sinn	Apple Valley HS	19th	376–126 (.749)	11–25 (.306) †	0	0	0	0
South Dakota	Kayla Karius	Drake (assistant)	2nd	14–16 (.467)	10–8 (.556)	0	0	0	0
South Dakota State	Aaron Johnston	South Dakota State (assistant)	24th	571–185 (.752)	228–34 (.861)	10	11	1	0

Notes:

- † St. Thomas joined the Summit League in the summer of 2021.
- Overall and Summit League records, conference titles, etc. are from time at current school and are through the end the 2022–23 season.
- NCAA tournament appearances are from time at current school only.

== Awards and honors ==
=== Players of the week ===
Throughout the conference regular season, the Summit League offices named one or two players of the week each Monday.

Week	Player of the Week	School	Ref.
Nov. 13	Kacie Borowicz	North Dakota	
Nov. 20	Hannah Cooper	Oral Roberts	
Nov. 27	Brooklyn Meyer	South Dakota State	
Dec. 4	Grace Larkins	South Dakota	
Dec. 11	Paige Meyer	South Dakota State (2)	
Dec. 18	Kendall Holmes	South Dakota (2)	
Dec. 27	Ruthie Udoumoh	Oral Roberts (2)	
Jan. 2	Taleyah Jones	Oral Roberts (3)	
Jan. 8	Paige Meyer (2)	South Dakota State (3)	
Jan. 15	Kacie Borowicz (2)	North Dakota (2)	
Jan. 22	Ruthie Udoumoh (2)	Oral Roberts (4)	
Jan. 29	Elle Evans	North Dakota State	
Jan. 29	Brooklyn Meyer (2)	South Dakota State (4)	
Feb. 5	Jordan Jones	Denver	
Feb. 12	Madison Mathiowetz	South Dakota State (5)	
Feb. 19	Brooklyn Meyer (3)	South Dakota State (6)	
Feb. 26	Paige Meyer (3)	South Dakota State (7)	
Mar. 4	Brooklyn Meyer (4)	South Dakota State (8)	

=== All-League Honors ===
The All-Summit League teams and individual awards were announced on March 7, ahead of the Summit League tournament.

2024 Summit League Women's Basketball Individual Awards
Award	Recipient(s)
Player of the Year	Brooklyn Meyer – South Dakota State
Newcomer of the Year	Taleyah Jones – Oral Roberts
Freshman of the Year	Emily Robinson – Oral Roberts
Sixth Woman of the Year	Jalei Oglesby – Oral Roberts
Defensive Player of the Year	Brooklyn Meyer – South Dakota State
Coach of the Year	Aaron Johnston – South Dakota State

Honor	Recipient
All-Summit League First Team	Brooklyn Meyer, South Dakota State
All-Summit League First Team	Elle Evans, North Dakota State
All-Summit League First Team	Paige Meyer, South Dakota State
All-Summit League First Team	Kacie Borowicz, North Dakota
All-Summit League First Team	Grace Larkins, South Dakota
All-Summit League First Team	Hannah Cooper, Oral Roberts
All-Summit League Second Team	Heaven Hamling, North Dakota State
All-Summit League Second Team	Taleyah Jones, Oral Roberts
All-Summit League Second Team	Jordan Jones, Denver
All-Summit League Second Team	Ruthie Udoumoh, Oral Roberts
All-Summit League Second Team	Jade Hill, St. Thomas
All-Summit League Honorable Mention	Amber Scalia, St. Thomas
All-Summit League Honorable Mention	Grace Cave, Omaha
All-Summit League Honorable Mention	Madison Mathiowetz, South Dakota State
All-Summit League Honorable Mention	Jalei Oglesby, Oral Roberts
All-Summit League Honorable Mention	Emma Smith, Denver
All-Defensive Team	Brooklyn Meyer, South Dakota State
All-Defensive Team	Ruthie Udoumoh, Oral Roberts
All-Defensive Team	Tori Nelson, South Dakota State
All-Defensive Team	Elle Evans, North Dakota State
All-Defensive Team	Hannah Cooper, Oral Roberts
All-Newcomer Team	Taleyah Jones, Oral Roberts
All-Newcomer Team	Jalei Oglesby, Oral Roberts
All-Newcomer Team	Kendall Holmes, South Dakota
All-Newcomer Team	Alayna Contreras, Kansas City
All-Newcomer Team	Dominique Phillips, Kansas City
All-Freshman Team	Emily Robinson, Oral Roberts
All-Freshman Team	Abby Krzewinski, North Dakota State
All-Freshman Team	Kiera Pemberton, North Dakota
All-Freshman Team	Emani Bennett, Kansas City
All-Freshman Team	Jenna Hopp, South Dakota State

== Postseason ==
=== Summit League tournament ===
All 9 teams qualify for the Summit League tournament. The tournament is held at the Denny Sanford Premier Center in Sioux Falls, South Dakota. It will be held from March 8 to March 12, 2024.

First Round; March 8 Summit League Network
8	Kansas City	55
9	Omaha	61

Quarterfinals; March 9 & 10; Summit League Network
1	South Dakota State	66
9	Omaha	53
4	South Dakota	70
5	St. Thomas	57
2	North Dakota State	72
7	Denver	60
3	Oral Roberts	91
6	North Dakota	68

Semifinals; March 11; CBS Sports Network
1	South Dakota State	76
4	South Dakota	63
2	North Dakota State	75
3	Oral Roberts	66

Championship; March 12; CBS Sports Network
1	South Dakota State	67
2	North Dakota State	54

=== NCAA tournament ===
Only South Dakota State was selected to participate in the tournament as the conference's automatic bid.

Seed	Region	School	First round	Second round	Sweet Sixteen	Elite Eight	Final Four	Championship
No. 12	Spokane Regional	South Dakota State	lost to No. 5 Utah 68–54	—	—	—	—	—
	1 Bid	W-L (%):	0–1 (.000)	0–0 (–)	0–0 (–)	0–0 (–)	0–0 (–)	TOTAL: 0–1 (.000)

=== WNIT ===
North Dakota State, Oral Roberts, and South Dakota were selected to participate in the tournament as at-large bids.

School	First round	Second round	Super 16	Great 8	Fab Four	Championship
North Dakota State	Bye	defeated Montana 72–63	lost to Minnesota 69–65	—	—	—
Oral Roberts	lost to Grambling 93–91	—	—	—	—	—
South Dakota	defeated UC Riverside 72–57	defeated Northern Arizona 79–65	lost to Wyoming 84–52	—	—	—
3 Bids W-L (%):	1–1 (.500)	2–0 (1.000)	0–2 (.000)	0–0 (–)	0–0 (–)	TOTAL: 3–3 (.500)
