= 2023–24 Omaha Mavericks women's basketball team =

American college basketball season

2023–24 Omaha Mavericks women's basketball
- Conference: Summit League
- Record: 8–23 (3–13 The Summit)
- Head coach: Carrie Banks (4th season)
- Assistant coaches: Ansar Al-Ameen; Jim Wiedie; Jaelyn Richard Harris
- Home arena: Baxter Arena

2023–24 Summit League women's basketball standings
	Conf.				Overall
Team	W		L	PCT	W		L	PCT
South Dakota State †	16	–	0	1.000	27	–	6	.818
North Dakota State	13	–	3	.813	22	–	12	.647
Oral Roberts	11	–	5	.688	21	–	11	.656
South Dakota	9	–	7	.563	23	–	13	.639
St. Thomas*	7	–	9	.438	15	–	16	.484
North Dakota	5	–	11	.313	9	–	21	.300
Denver	5	–	11	.313	8	–	22	.267
Kansas City	3	–	13	.188	12	–	20	.375
Omaha	3	–	13	.188	8	–	23	.258
† 2024 Summit League tournament winner * Ineligible for the 2024 NCAA tournament due to transition from Division III

The 2023–24 Omaha Mavericks women's basketball team represented the University of Nebraska Omaha in the 2023–24 NCAA Division I women's basketball season. The Mavericks, led by fourth-year head coach Carrie Banks, competed in the Summit League. They played their home games at Baxter Arena in Omaha, Nebraska.

== Previous season ==
The Mavericks finished the 2022–23 season 15–17, 8–10 in Summit League play, to finish in a three-way tie for fifth place. Due to a tiebreaker, they were the No. 6 seed in the Summit League tournament, they defeated North Dakota in the quarterfinals and Kansas City in the semifinals to advance to the championship game where they lost to South Dakota State.

== Offseason ==
=== Departures ===
Omaha departures
Name	Num	Pos.	Height	Year	Hometown	Reason for departure
Sam Mitchell	2	G	5' 6"	Senior	Downers Grove, IL	Graduated
Akili Felici	3	G	5' 10"	(redshirt) Junior	Bellevue, NE	TBD
Elena Pilakouta	5	C	6' 3"	GS Senior	Nicosia, Cyprus	Graduated
Jaylen Townsend	10	G	5' 8"	Junior	Edwardsville, IL	TBD

==== Recruiting ====
There was no recruiting class of 2023.

== Roster ==
2023–24 Omaha Mavericks women's basketball team
Players
Coaches

Pos.	#	Name	Height	Year	Previous school	Hometown
G	00	Aaliyah Stanley	5 ft 6 in (1.68 m)	GS	Oxbridge Academy; Florida Gulf Coast	Boynton Beach, FL
C	1	Deanay Watson	5 ft 10 in (1.78 m)	GS	Manatee; Southeast Missouri State	Bradenton, FL
G	4	Polina Nikulochkina	5 ft 7 in (1.7 m)	Sr	West Oaks Academy; Tallahassee CC	Moscow, Russia
F	11	Alison Stephens	5 ft 11 in (1.8 m)	Fr	Homestead	Fort Wayne, IN
G	14	Katie Keitges	5 ft 8 in (1.73 m)	Sr	Knoxville	Knoxville, IA
G	20	Grace Cave	5 ft 7 in (1.7 m)	Jr	Weeping Water	Weeping Water, NE
G	21	Kennedi Grant	5 ft 7 in (1.7 m)	Jr	Midwest City	Midwest City, OK
F	22	Cora Olsen	5 ft 8 in (1.73 m)	Fr	Millard South	Omaha, NE
G	23	Ana Nikulochkina	5 ft 6 in (1.68 m)	Sr	West Oaks Academy; Tallahassee CC	Moscow, Russia
F	24	Morgann Gardner	6 ft 2 in (1.88 m)	Jr	Grand Island Central Catholic	Racine, WI
C	54	Brooklynn Smith	6 ft 2 in (1.88 m)	So	Waterloo West	Waterloo, IA

Head coach

- Carrie Banks (Detroit Mercy)

Assistant coach(es)

- Ansar Al-Ameen
- Jim Wiedie (Kent State)
- Jaelyn Richard Harris (LSU)

Legend

- (C) Team captain
- (S) Suspended
- (I) Ineligible
- (W) Walk-on
- Injured
- Current redshirt

Roster
Last update: October 6, 2024

== Schedule and results ==
Date time, TV	Rank^{#}	Opponent^{#}	Result	Record	High points	High rebounds	High assists	Site (attendance) city, state
Regular season
November 6, 2023*; 5:00 p.m., SLN		Illinois State	L 59–105	0–1	10 – 2 tied	5 – Olsen	2 – Cave	Baxter Arena (512); Omaha, NE
November 8, 2023*; 7:00 p.m., SLN		College of Saint Mary	W 89–59	1–1	17 – Olsen	5 – Olsen	4 – Stanley	Baxter Arena (537); Omaha, NE
November 12, 2023*; 2:00 p.m., BTN+		at Northwestern	L 69–87	1–2	18 – Keitges	5 – Olsen	6 – Grant	Welsh–Ryan Arena (1,566); Evanston, IL
November 17, 2023*; 12:00 p.m., SLN		Northern Colorado	L 70–82	1–3	19 – Olsen	5 – 2 tied	5 – Grant	Baxter Arena (5,539); Omaha, NE
November 20, 2023*; 6:00 p.m., ESPN+		at Wichita State	L 86–92	1–4	18 – Nikulochkina	5 – 3 tied	5 – 2 tied	Charles Koch Arena (1,052); Wichita, KS
November 27, 2023*; 5:00 p.m., SLN		Cal State Bakersfield	W 87–79 ^{OT}	2–4	18 – Nikulochkina	5 – 3 tied	5 – 2 tied	Baxter Arena (312); Omaha, NE
December 1, 2023*; 7:00 p.m., SLN		UIC	L 89–95	2–5	33 – Stanley	7 – Watson	3 – 2 tied	Baxter Arena (852); Omaha, NE
December 5, 2023*; 7:00 p.m., ESPN+		at Western Illinois	L 75–78	2–6	19 – Grant	5 – 4 tied	6 – Cave	Western Hall (539); Macomb, IL
December 10, 2023*; 2:00 p.m., SLN		Peru State	W 92–70	3–6	19 – Gardner	13 – Cave	5 – Nikulochkina	Sapp Fieldhouse (262); Omaha, NE
December 18, 2023*; 5:30 p.m., ESPN+		at Texas Southern	W 68–63	4–6	20 – Grant	10 – Grant	6 – Cave	H&PE Arena (300); Houston, TX
December 20, 2023*; 6:30 p.m., ESPN+		at No. 25 TCU	L 56–96	4–7	12 – Olsen	7 – Watson	4 – Cave	Schollmaier Arena (1,725); Fort Worth, TX
December 29, 2023; 7:00 p.m., SLN		at Denver	L 63–81	4–8 (0–1)	20 – 2 tied	6 – 2 tied	3 – Nikulochkina	Hamilton Gymnasium (344); Denver, CO
December 31, 2023; 2:00 p.m., SLN		South Dakota	L 71–77 ^{OT}	4–9 (0–2)	17 – Cave	7 – Cave	5 – Cave	Baxter Arena (706); Omaha, NE
January 3, 2024*; 8:00 p.m., ESPN+		at Eastern Washington; Summit League–Big Sky Challenge	L 82–96	4–10	32 – Stanley	10 – Watson	4 – 2 tied	Reese Court (492); Cheney, WA
January 6, 2023*; 2:00 p.m., SLN		Montana; Summit League–Big Sky Challenge	W 81–60	4–11	17 – Keitges	6 – Nikulochkina	2 – 3 tied	Baxter Arena (564); Omaha, NE
January 11, 2024; 7:00 p.m., SLN		at North Dakota	L 75–100	4–12 (0–3)	27 – Cave	5 – Cave	3 – Cave	Betty Engelstad Sioux Center (1,127); Grand Forks, ND
January 13, 2024; 1:00 p.m., SLN		at North Dakota State	L 69–87	4–13 (0–4)	22 – Olsen	6 – Stanley	1 – 5 tied	Scheels Center (673); Fargo, ND
January 18, 2024; 7:00 p.m., SLN		South Dakota State	L 55–92	4–14 (0–5)	12 – Stanley	5 – 2 tied	5 – Grant	Baxter Arena (239); Omaha, NE
January 20, 2024; 2:00 p.m., SLN		at Kansas City	L 74–88	4–15 (0–6)	21 – Grant	9 – Grant	8 – Cave	Swinney Recreation Center (292); Kansas City, MO
January 25, 2024; 7:00 p.m., SLN		Oral Roberts	L 78–88	4–16 (0–7)	17 – Grant	8 – Grant	5 – Grant	Baxter Arena (374); Omaha, NE
January 27, 2024; 7:00 p.m., SLN		Denver	W 80–77	5–16 (1–7)	24 – Grant	6 – Olsen	2 – 3 tied	Baxter Arena (431); Omaha, NE
February 1, 2024; 7:00 p.m., SLN		at St. Thomas (MN)	L 83–88	5–17 (1–8)	17 – Cave	6 – Watson	6 – Cave	Schoenecker Arena (405); St. Paul, MN
February 8, 2024; 7:00 p.m., SLN		North Dakota	L 81–83	5–18 (1–9)	18 – Gardner	7 – Gardner	8 – Cave	Baxter Arena (394); Omaha, NE
February 10, 2024; 2:00 p.m., SLN		North Dakota State	L 70–84	5–19 (1–10)	15 – Cave	7 – Gardner	6 – Grant	Baxter Arena (524); Omaha, NE
February 15, 2024; 6:00 p.m., SLN		at South Dakota	W 77–67	6–19 (2–10)	17 – Gardner	10 – Gardner	6 – Grant	Sanford Coyote Sports Center (1,397); Vermillion, SD
February 17, 2024; 2:00 p.m., SLN		at South Dakota State	L 57–79	6–20 (2–11)	25 – Cave	5 – Olsen	4 – Keitges	Frost Arena (2,409); Brookings, SD
February 22, 2024; 7:00 p.m., SLN		at Oral Roberts	L 78–87	6–21 (2–12)	13 – Grant	10 – Watson	4 – Grant	Mabee Center (967); Tulsa, OK
February 24, 2024; 2:00 p.m., SLN		Kansas City	L 56–72	6–22 (2–13)	11 – Nikulochkina	7 – Gardner	2 – 2 tied	Baxter Arena (404); Omaha, NE
February 29, 2024; 7:00 p.m., SLN		St. Thomas (MN)	W 79–62	7–22 (3–13)	20 – Nikulochkina	7 – Olsen	3 – 2 tied	Baxter Arena (542); Omaha, NE
Summit League women's tournament
March 8, 2024; 4:30 p.m., SLN	(9)	vs. (8) Kansas City; First round	W 61–55	8–22	17 – Nikulochkina	9 – Nikulochkina	3 – Grant	Denny Sanford Premier Center; Sioux Falls, SD
March 9, 2024; 12:30 p.m., SLN	(9)	vs. (1) South Dakota State; Quarterfinals	L 53–66	8–23	14 – Stanley	5 – 2 tied	7 – Grant	Denny Sanford Premier Center (8,648); Sioux Falls, SD
*Non-conference game. ^{#}Rankings from AP poll. (#) Tournament seedings in parentheses. All times are in Central.

== See also ==
- 2023–24 Omaha Mavericks men's basketball team
