= 2023–24 South Dakota State Jackrabbits women's basketball team =

Intercollegiate basketball season

2023–24 South Dakota State Jackrabbits women's basketball

Summit League regular-season and tournament champions

NCAA tournament, first round
- Conference: Summit League
- Record: 27–6 (16–0 The Summit)
- Head coach: Aaron Johnston (24th full, 25th overall season)
- Assistant coaches: Carissa Thielbar (10th season); Megan Lueck (6th season); Sadie Thramer (3rd season)
- Home arena: Frost Arena

2023–24 Summit League women's basketball standings
	Conf.				Overall
Team	W		L	PCT	W		L	PCT
South Dakota State †	16	–	0	1.000	27	–	6	.818
North Dakota State	13	–	3	.813	22	–	12	.647
Oral Roberts	11	–	5	.688	21	–	11	.656
South Dakota	9	–	7	.563	23	–	13	.639
St. Thomas*	7	–	9	.438	15	–	16	.484
North Dakota	5	–	11	.313	9	–	21	.300
Denver	5	–	11	.313	8	–	22	.267
Kansas City	3	–	13	.188	12	–	20	.375
Omaha	3	–	13	.188	8	–	23	.258
† 2024 Summit League tournament winner * Ineligible for the 2024 NCAA tournament due to transition from Division III

The 2023–24 South Dakota State Jackrabbits women's basketball team represented South Dakota State University in the 2023–24 NCAA Division I women's basketball season. The Jackrabbits were led by 24th-year head coach Aaron Johnston, and competed in the Summit League. They played their home games in Frost Arena in Brookings, South Dakota.

The Jackrabbits finished the season 27–6 overall and 16–0 in conference play. They finished in first place in the conference during the season and were the first overall seed for the Summit League tournament. After a bye in the first round, the Jackrabbits defeated ninth seed Omaha in the second round and South Dakota in the semifinals. They reached the Summit League tournament finals for the third consecutive year and six of the past seven years, this year playing second seed North Dakota State, against whom they won. The Jackrabbits won all Summit League tournament games by 13 points. With the win in the Summit League tournament, the Jackrabbits received an automatic bid to the NCAA tournament. During the selection show, it was announced that the Jackrabbits would be placed in the Portland regional 4 as the 12 seed with a first-round matchup against Pac-12 opponent Utah, to whom they lost.

== Previous season ==
In the 2022–23 season, the Jackrabbits went 29–6 overall and 18–0 in conference play. They won the Summit League tournament by beating sixth seed Omaha 93–51. They earned an automatic bid to the 2023 NCAA Division I women's basketball tournament as a nine seed in the Seattle Region. The Jackrabbits beat USC in the first round 62–57 in overtime. In the second round, the Jackrabbits lost to number one seed Virginia Tech 72–60.

=== Departures ===
Name	Number	Pos.	Height	Year	Hometown	Reason for departure
Dru Gylten	10	G	5' 10"	Graduate student	Rapid City, SD	Graduated
Regan Nesheim	42	F	6' 1"	RS junior	Johnston, IA	Graduated
Myah Selland	44	F	6' 1"	RS senior	Letcher, SD	Graduated

=== Additions ===
Name	Number	Pos.	Height	Year	Hometown	Notes
Jenna Hopp	2	G	5' 11"	Freshman	Glenwood, IA	Signed for the 2023–24 season
Hilary Behrens	30	G	6' 0"	Freshman	Brandon, SD	Signed for the 2023–24 season

== Roster ==
2023–24 South Dakota State Jackrabbits women's basketball team
Players
Coaches

Pos.	#	Name	Height	Year	Previous school	Hometown
G	2	Jenna Hopp	5 ft 11 in (1.8 m)	Fr	Glenwood Senior High School	Glenwood, IA
G	3	Madison Mathiowetz	5 ft 10 in (1.78 m)	So	St. Mary's High School	Sleepy Eye, MN
G	4	Isabel Aesoph	5 ft 6 in (1.68 m)	So	Faulkton High School	Orient, SD
G	5	Ellie Colbeck	5 ft 10 in (1.78 m)	So	Kennedy Secondary School	Fergus Falls, MN
F	12	Kallie Theisen (redshirt)	6 ft 1 in (1.85 m)	Sr	Wayzata High School	Plymouth, MN
G	13	Haleigh Timmer (redshirt)	5 ft 11 in (1.8 m)	Jr	St. Thomas More High School	Rapid City, SD
G	15	Tori Tollefson	5 ft 7 in (1.7 m)	Sr	Chanhassen High School	Chanhassen, MN
F	20	Tori Nelson	6 ft 1 in (1.85 m)	Sr	Henry Sibley High School	Mendota Heights, MN
G	21	Paige Meyer	5 ft 6 in (1.68 m)	Jr	Albany High School	Albany, MN
F	22	Madysen Vlastuin	6 ft 1 in (1.85 m)	Jr	Lennox High School	Lennox, SD
F	24	Mesa Byom	6 ft 2 in (1.88 m)	Jr	Melrose-Mindoro High School	Melrose, WI
G	30	Hilary Behrens	6 ft 0 in (1.83 m)	Fr	Brandon Valley High School	Brandon, SD
F	31	Brooklyn Meyer	6 ft 2 in (1.88 m)	So	West Lyon Community School	Larchwood, IA
F	34	Natalie Nielsen	6 ft 3 in (1.91 m)	RS Fr	Akron–Westfield Senior High School	Akron, IA

Head coach

- Aaron Johnston (Gustavus Adolphus)

Assistant coach(es)

- Carissa Thielbar (UW–Superior)
- Megan Lueck (Minnesota Duluth)
- Sadie Thramer (Wayne State (NE))

Legend

- (C) Team captain
- (S) Suspended
- (I) Ineligible
- (W) Walk-on
- Injured
- Current redshirt

Roster
Last update: March 31, 2025

== Schedule ==
Date time, TV	Rank^{#}	Opponent^{#}	Result	Record	Site (attendance) city, state
Exhibition
November 1, 2023*; 6:00 p.m.		Minnesota Duluth	W 73–49	0–0	Frost Arena; Brookings, SD
Regular season
November 6, 2023*; 6:00 p.m., SLN		Arkansas State	W 55–42	1–0	Frost Arena (2,029); Brookings, SD
November 14, 2023*; 6:30 p.m., BTN+		at Wisconsin	L 64–66	1–1	Kohl Center (2,913); Madison, WI
November 18, 2023*; 1:00 p.m., ESPN+		at UT Martin	W 55–38	2–1	Skyhawk Arena (1,102); Martin, TN
November 20, 2023*; 6:00 p.m., SECN+		at No. 1 South Carolina	L 38–78	2–2	Colonial Life Arena (14,799); Columbia, SC
November 24, 2023*; 6:00 p.m., SLN/MidcoSN2		South Carolina State	W 72–42	3–2	Frost Arena (2,139); Brookings, SD
November 28, 2023*; 7:00 p.m., SLN		Washburn	W 95–58	4–2	Frost Arena (1,347); Brookings, SD
December 5, 2023*; 6:00 p.m., SLN/MidcoSN		No. 21 Washington State	L 64–69	4–3	Frost Arena (1,827); Brookings, SD
December 9, 2023*; 2:00 p.m., ESPN+		at Northern Iowa	W 78–59	5–3	McLeod Center (4,193); Cedar Falls, IA
December 12, 2023*; 7:00 p.m., SLN		Dordt	W 66–54	6–3	Frost Arena (1,438); Brookings, SD
December 17, 2023*; 4:00 p.m., ESPN+		at No. 21 Gonzaga	L 58–83	6–4	McCarthey Athletic Center (5,120); Spokane, WA
December 21, 2023*; 6:00 p.m., FloSports		at No. 21т Creighton	L 46–58	6–5	D. J. Sokol Arena (2,056); Omaha, NE
December 31, 2023; 12:00 p.m., CBSSN		at North Dakota	W 74–53	7–5 (1–0)	Betty Engelstad Sioux Center (1,214); Grand Forks, ND
January 3, 2024*; 7:00 p.m., ESPN+		at Northern Arizona; Big Sky–Summit Challenge	W 110–102 ^{2OT}	8–5	Walkup Skydome (287); Flagstaff, AZ
January 6, 2024*; 2:00 p.m., SLN		Montana State; Big Sky–Summit Challenge	W 61–53	9–5	Frost Arena (1,843); Brookings, SD
January 11, 2024; 7:00 p.m., SLN/MidcoSN		St. Thomas (MN)	W 75–55	10–5 (2–0)	Frost Arena (1,536); Brookings, SD
January 13, 2024; 2:00 p.m., SLN/MidcoSN2		Denver	W 68–50	11–5 (3–0)	Frost Arena (1,226); Brookings, SD
January 18, 2024; 7:00 p.m., SLN		at Omaha	W 92–55	12–5 (4–0)	Baxter Arena (239); Omaha, NE
January 20, 2024; 6:00 p.m., SLN/MidcoSN		South Dakota	W 73–55	13–5 (5–0)	Frost Arena (3,671); Brookings, SD
January 25, 2024; 7:00 p.m., SLN		at Kansas City	W 72–49	14–5 (6–0)	Swinney Recreation Center (559); Kansas City, MO
January 28, 2024; 3:00 p.m., CBSSN		Oral Roberts	W 96–80	15–5 (7–0)	Frost Arena (2,042); Brookings, SD
February 1, 2024; 7:00 p.m., SLN		at North Dakota State	W 65–58	16–5 (8–0)	Scheels Center (1,683); Fargo, ND
February 3, 2024; 6:00 p.m., SLN		at South Dakota	W 70–55	17–5 (9–0)	Sanford Coyote Sports Center (3,316); Vermillion, SD
February 10, 2024; 2:00 p.m., SLN		at Oral Roberts	W 103–77	18–5 (10–0)	Mabee Center (1,185); Tulsa, OK
February 15, 2024; 7:00 p.m., SLN/MidcoSN2		Kansas City	W 74–53	19–5 (11–0)	Frost Arena (1,828); Brookings, SD
February 17, 2024; 2:00 p.m., SLN/MidcoSN		Omaha	W 79–57	20–5 (12–0)	Frost Arena (2,409); Brookings, SD
February 22, 2024; 7:00 p.m., SLN		at Denver	W 73–64	21–5 (13–0)	Hamilton Gymnasium (262); Denver, CO
February 24, 2024; 1:00 p.m., SLN		at St. Thomas (MN)	W 97–63	22–5 (14–0)	Schoenecker Arena (946); St. Paul, MN
February 29, 2024; 7:00 p.m., SLN/MidcoSN2		North Dakota	W 103–47	23–5 (15–0)	Frost Arena (2,134); Brookings, SD
March 2, 2024; 2:00 p.m., SLN		North Dakota State	W 89–74	24–5 (16–0)	Frost Arena (3,768); Brookings, SD
Summit League tournament
March 9, 2024; 3:30 p.m., SLN	(1)	vs. (9) Omaha; Quarterfinals	W 66–53	25–5	Denny Sanford Premier Center (8,648); Sioux Falls, SD
March 11, 2024; 12:30 p.m., CBSSN	(1)	vs. (4) South Dakota; Semifinals	W 76–63	26–5	Denny Sanford Premier Center; Sioux Falls, SD
March 12, 2024; 3:30 p.m., CBSSN	(1)	vs. (2) North Dakota State; Championship	W 67–54	27–5	Denny Sanford Premier Center (7,883); Sioux Falls, SD
NCAA tournament
March 23, 2024*; 9:00 pm, ESPNU	(12 P4)	vs. (5 P4) No. 21 Utah; First round	L 54–68	27–6	McCarthey Athletic Center (6,000); Spokane, WA
*Non-conference game. ^{#}Rankings from AP poll. (#) Tournament seedings in parentheses. P4=Portland 4. All times are in Central.
