= 2023–24 St. Thomas (Minnesota) Tommies women's basketball team =

American college basketball season

2023–24 St. Thomas (Minnesota) Tommies women's basketball
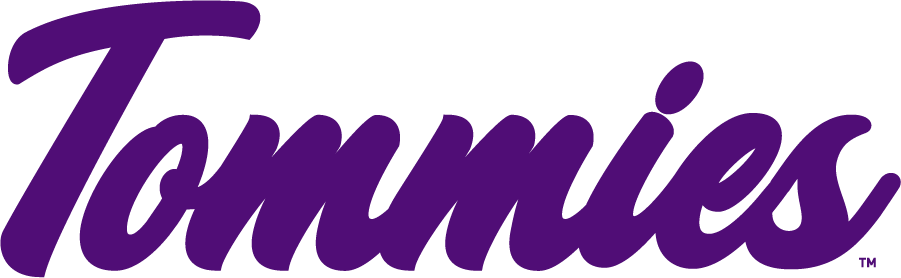
- Conference: Summit League
- Record: 15–16 (7–9 The Summit)
- Head coach: Ruth Sinn (19th season)
- Assistant coaches: Kyle Lurvey; Garrett Solis; Madison McKeever
- Home arena: Schoenecker Arena

2023–24 Summit League women's basketball standings
	Conf.				Overall
Team	W		L	PCT	W		L	PCT
South Dakota State †	16	–	0	1.000	27	–	6	.818
North Dakota State	13	–	3	.813	22	–	12	.647
Oral Roberts	11	–	5	.688	21	–	11	.656
South Dakota	9	–	7	.563	23	–	13	.639
St. Thomas*	7	–	9	.438	15	–	16	.484
North Dakota	5	–	11	.313	9	–	21	.300
Denver	5	–	11	.313	8	–	22	.267
Kansas City	3	–	13	.188	12	–	20	.375
Omaha	3	–	13	.188	8	–	23	.258
† 2024 Summit League tournament winner * Ineligible for the 2024 NCAA tournament due to transition from Division III

The 2023–24 St. Thomas Tommies women's basketball team represented the University of St. Thomas in the 2023–24 NCAA Division I women's basketball season. The Tommies, led by 19th-year head coach Ruth Sinn, played their home games at Schoenecker Arena in Saint Paul, Minnesota as members of the Summit League. They finished the season 15–16, 7–9 in Summit League play, to finish in fifth place.

This season was St. Thomas's third year of a five-year transition period from Division III to Division I, an incredibly rare and historic jump that bypassed Division II altogether.

== Previous season ==
The Tommies finished the 2022–23 season 13–17, 7–11 in Summit League play, to finish in eighth place. As the No. 8 seed in the Summit League tournament, they defeated Western Illinois in the first round before losing in the quarterfinals to South Dakota State.

== Offseason ==
=== Departures ===
St. Thomas (Minnesota) departures
Name	Num	Pos.	Height	Year	Hometown	Reason for departure
Maggie Negaard	23	G	5' 10"	Senior	Stevens Point, WI	Graduated
Autam Mendez	32	G	5' 8"	GS senior	Saint Paul, MN	Graduated
Natalie Greenwood	33	F	6' 3"	(redshirt) Freshman	Roanoke, TX	TBD
Audrey Hatfield	50	C	6' 2"	Sophomore	Hudson, WI	Return to St. Thomas T&F

=== Incoming ===
St. Thomas (Minnesota) incoming transfers
Name	Num	Pos.	Height	Year	Hometown	Previous school
Angelina Hammond	25	G/F	6' 1"	GS senior	Hopkins, MN	Minnesota

==== Recruiting ====
There was no recruiting class of 2023.

== Roster ==
2023–24 St. Thomas (Minnesota) Tommies women's basketball team
Players
Coaches

Pos.	#	Name	Height	Year	Previous school	Hometown
G	2	Lizzie Steingraber	5 ft 9 in (1.75 m)	Fr	New London	New London, WI
G	3	Sammie Beyer	5 ft 6 in (1.68 m)	Fr	Appleton	Appleton, WI
G	4	Jade Hill	5 ft 7 in (1.7 m)	Jr	South	Minneapolis, MN
G	5	Faith Feuerbach	6 ft 0 in (1.83 m)	So	Sycamore	Sycamore, IL
G	11	Zoey Washington	5 ft 8 in (1.73 m)	Fr	St. Croix Lutheran	Mahtomedi, MN
G	12	Jordyn Glynn	5 ft 9 in (1.75 m)	GS	Grand Meadow	Grand Meadow, MN
G	13	Gabby Johnson	5 ft 8 in (1.73 m)	Jr	Freedom	Freedom, WI
F	14	Jordyn Lamker	6 ft 0 in (1.83 m)	Jr	Maple Grove	Maple Grove, MN
G	15	Phoebe Frentzel	5 ft 9 in (1.75 m)	Jr	Arrowhead	Hartland, WI
F	20	Sammy Opichka	6 ft 0 in (1.83 m)	Jr	Notre Dame Academy	Green Bay, WI
G	21	Amber Scalia	5 ft 9 in (1.75 m)	So	Stillwater	Stillwater, MN
F	22	Emma Miner	6 ft 0 in (1.83 m)	Fr	Dallas Center–Grimes	Grimes, IA
G	24	Ellie Dague	5 ft 10 in (1.78 m)	RS So	Henning; North Dakota State	Henning, MN
G/F	25	Angelina Hammond	5 ft 11 in (1.8 m)	GS	Hopkins; Minnesota	Hopkins, MN
C	34	Jo Langbehn	6 ft 2 in (1.88 m)	Jr	Elk River	Elk River, MN

Head coach

- Ruth Sinn (St. Thomas)

Assistant coach(es)

- Kyle Lurvey (Taylor)
- Garrett Solis (Eastern Michigan)
- Madison McKeever (South Dakota)

Legend

- (C) Team captain
- (S) Suspended
- (I) Ineligible
- (W) Walk-on
- Injured
- Current redshirt

Roster
Last update: July 1, 2024

== Schedule and results ==
Date time, TV	Rank^{#}	Opponent^{#}	Result	Record	High points	High rebounds	High assists	Site (attendance) city, state
Regular season
November 6, 2023*; 6:00 p.m., ESPN+		at Drake	L 69–94	0–1	16 – Langbehn	10 – Hill	6 – Hill	Knapp Center (2,108); Des Moines, IA
November 11, 2023*; 3:00 p.m., SLN		UW–River Falls	W 101–62	1–1	26 – Hill	10 – Langbehn	5 – Frentzel	Schoenecker Arena (491); Saint Paul, MN
November 11, 2023*; 2:30 p.m., SLN		Utah Valley	W 70–62	2–1	28 – Scalia	9 – Hammond	4 – Hill	Schoenecker Arena (315); St. Paul, MN
November 21, 2023*; 8:30 p.m., ESPN+		at Saint Mary's	W 74–60	3–1	19 – Langbehn	10 – Glynn	6 – Glynn	University Credit Union Pavilion (308); Moraga, CA
November 24, 2023*; 3:00 p.m., ESPN+		vs. UC Irvine; Tiger Turkey Tip-Off	L 63–74	3–2	18 – Scalia	5 – Langbehn	6 – Glynn	Alex G. Spanos Center (253); Stockton, CA
November 25, 2023*; 3:00 p.m., ESPN+		vs. Butler; Tiger Turkey Tip-Off	L 54–76	3–3	15 – Glynn	8 – Langbehn	4 – Feuerbach	Alex G. Spanos Center; Stockton, CA
November 29, 2023*; 7:00 p.m., SLN		Iowa State	L 44–85	3–4	11 – Hill	5 – 2 tied	4 – Hill	Schoenecker Arena (979); St. Paul, MN
December 2, 2023*; 1:00 p.m., ESPN+		at Western Illinois	L 78–82	3–5	21 – Hill	8 – Hammond	5 – Hill	Western Hall (623); Macomb, IL
December 7, 2023*; 7:00 p.m., ESPN+		at Milwaukee	W 67–65	4–5	24 – Scalia	7 – 2 tied	3 – 2 tied	Klotsche Center (704); Milwaukee, WI
December 9, 2023*; 3:00 p.m., ESPN+		at Purdue Fort Wayne	W 64–59	5–5	16 – Scalia	8 – Glenn	5 – Hill	War Memorial Coliseum (1,838); Fort Wayne, IN
December 13, 2023*; 7:00 p.m., SLN		Wisconsin	L 55–78	5–6	14 – Langbehn	5 – Langbehn	4 – Glynn	Schoenecker Arena (883); St. Paul, MN
December 16, 2023*; 3:00 p.m., SLN		UW–Whitewater	W 82–49	6–6	19 – Langbehn	7 – Glynn	6 – Hill	Schoenecker Arena (303); St. Paul, MN
December 29, 2023; 1:00 p.m., SLN		North Dakota	W 95–76	7–6 (1–0)	27 – Scalia	7 – Hammond	7 – Hill	Schoenecker Arena (435); St. Paul, MN
December 31, 2023; 2:00 p.m., SLN		at Kansas City	W 66–57	8–6 (2–0)	17 – Langbehn	13 – Langbehn	4 – Glynn	Swinney Recreation Center (472); Kansas City, MO
January 3, 2024*; 7:00 p.m., SLN		Sacramento State; Big Sky–Summit Challenge	W 70–52	9–6	22 – Scalia	6 – 3 tied	5 – Glynn	Schoenecker Arena (623); St. Paul, MN
January 6, 2024*; 4:00 p.m., ESPN+		at Portland State; Big Sky–Summit Challenge	W 62–44	10–6	16 – Scalia	7 – Langbehn	5 – Hill	Viking Pavilion (371); Portland, OR
January 11, 2024; 7:00 p.m., SLN		at South Dakota State	L 55–75	10–7 (2–1)	20 – Scalia	10 – Langbehn	4 – 2 tied	Frost Arena (1,536); Brookings, SD
January 13, 2024; 12:00 p.m., SLN		Oral Roberts	W 73–72	11–7 (3–1)	24 – Hill	8 – Langbehn	6 – Scalia	Schoenecker Arena (360); St. Paul, MN
January 18, 2024; 7:00 p.m., SLN		South Dakota	L 61–63	11–8 (3–2)	17 – 2 tied	8 – Hammond	3 – Glynn	Schoenecker Arena (445); St. Paul, MN
January 25, 2024; 7:00 p.m., SLN		at North Dakota State	L 52–85	11–9 (3–3)	15 – Scalia	6 – 2 tied	3 – Hill	Scheels Center (523); Fargo, ND
January 27, 2024; 1:00 p.m., SLN		at North Dakota	W 76–66	12–9 (4–3)	32 – Scalia	7 – Glynn	4 – Hill	Betty Engelstad Sioux Center (1,290); Grand Forks, ND
February 1, 2024; 7:00 p.m., SLN		Omaha	W 88–83	13–9 (5–3)	30 – Scalia	9 – Opichka	7 – Hill	Schoenecker Arena (405); St. Paul, MN
February 3, 2024; 12:00 p.m., SLN/Fox 9+		Kansas City	W 75–55	14–9 (6–3)	22 – Langbehn	8 – Glynn	8 – Hill	Schoenecker Arena (445); St. Paul, MN
February 8, 2024; 7:00 p.m., SLN		at Oral Roberts	L 73–80	14–10 (6–4)	14 – 2 tied	11 – Langbehn	6 – Scalia	Mabee Center (764); Tulsa, OK
February 10, 2024; 12:00 p.m., SLN/Fox 9+		Denver	L 61–67	14–11 (6–5)	14 – 2 tied	9 – Opichka	4 – Scalia	Schoenecker Arena (345); St. Paul, MN
February 17, 2024; 6:00 p.m., SLN		at South Dakota	L 61–75	14–12 (6–6)	22 – Hill	6 – Glynn	4 – Hill	Sanford Coyote Sports Center (1,702); Vermillion, SD
February 22, 2024; 7:00 p.m., SLN		North Dakota State	L 53–96	14–13 (6–7)	12 – Langbehn	6 – Opichka	4 – 2 tied	Schoenecker Arena (451); St. Paul, MN
February 24, 2024; 1:00 p.m., SLN		South Dakota State	W 97–63	14–14 (6–8)	15 – Opichka	4 – Hammond	6 – Hill	Schoenecker Arena (946); St. Paul, MN
February 29, 2024; 7:00 p.m., SLN		at Omaha	W 79–62	14–15 (6–9)	22 – Langbehn	8 – Langbehn	4 – Scalia	Baxter Arena (542); Omaha, NE
March 2, 2024; 4:00 p.m., SLN		at Denver	W 79–68	15–15 (7–9)	25 – Scalia	6 – Hammond	7 – Scalia	Hamilton Gymnasium (517); Denver, CO
Summit League women's tournament
March 10, 2024; 3:00 p.m., SLN	(5)	vs. (4) South Dakota; Quarterfinals	L 57–70	15–16	22 – Scalia	6 – Glynn	6 – Hill	Denny Sanford Premier Center; Sioux Falls, SD
*Non-conference game. ^{#}Rankings from AP poll. (#) Tournament seedings in parentheses. All times are in Central.

== See also ==
- 2023–24 St. Thomas (Minnesota) Tommies men's basketball team
