= 2023–24 North Dakota Fighting Hawks women's basketball team =

American college basketball season

2023–24 North Dakota Fighting Hawks women's basketball
- Conference: Summit League
- Record: 9–21 (5–11 The Summit)
- Head coach: Mallory Bernhard (4th season)
- Assistant coaches: Travis Bledsoe; John Motherwell; Sabra Wimberley
- Home arena: Betty Engelstad Sioux Center

2023–24 Summit League women's basketball standings
| | Conf. | | | | Overall |
| Team | W | | L | PCT | W | | L | PCT |
|---|---|---|---|---|---|---|---|---|
| South Dakota State † | 16 | – | 0 | 1.000 | 27 | – | 6 | .818 |
| North Dakota State | 13 | – | 3 | .813 | 22 | – | 12 | .647 |
| Oral Roberts | 11 | – | 5 | .688 | 21 | – | 11 | .656 |
| South Dakota | 9 | – | 7 | .563 | 23 | – | 13 | .639 |
| St. Thomas* | 7 | – | 9 | .438 | 15 | – | 16 | .484 |
| North Dakota | 5 | – | 11 | .313 | 9 | – | 21 | .300 |
| Denver | 5 | – | 11 | .313 | 8 | – | 22 | .267 |
| Kansas City | 3 | – | 13 | .188 | 12 | – | 20 | .375 |
| Omaha | 3 | – | 13 | .188 | 8 | – | 23 | .258 |
† 2024 Summit League tournament winner * Ineligible for the 2024 NCAA tournament due to transition from Division III

The 2023–24 North Dakota Fighting Hawks women's basketball team represented the University of North Dakota in the 2023–24 NCAA Division I women's basketball season. The Fighting Hawks, led by fourth-year head coach Mallory Bernhard, competed in the Summit League and played their home games in Betty Engelstad Sioux Center in Grand Forks, North Dakota.

The Fighting Hawks finished the season 9–21, 5–11 in Summit League play, to finish in a tie for sixth place. They were defeated by Oral Roberts in the quarterfinals of the Summit League tournament.

== Previous season ==
The Fighting Hawks finished the 2022–23 season 19–13, 11–7 in Summit League play, to finish in third place. As the No. 3 seed in the Summit League tournament, they lost in the quarterfinals to Omaha. They were invited to the WBI, where they lost in the first round to California Baptist, won in the semifinals against Northern Illinois, but lost in the finals to FIU.

== Offseason ==
=== Departures ===
North Dakota departures
| Name | Num | Pos. | Height | Year | Hometown | Reason for departure |
|---|---|---|---|---|---|---|
| Joli Daniger | 1 | G | 5' 7" | GS senior | Andover, MN | Graduated |
| Maggie Manson | 3 | G | 5' 9" | Senior | Fargo, ND | Graduated |
| Claire Orth | 10 | G/F | 5' 10" | GS senior | Lino Lakes, MN | Graduated |
| Tara Bieniewicz | 14 | G/F | 6' 0" | GS senior | Chesterfield, MI | Graduated |
| Allie McCarthy | 24 | G | 6' 0" | Sophomore | Grand Falls, NB | Transferred to Ottawa |
| Juliet Gordon | 54 | F | 5' 11" | GS senior | Adelaide, Australia | Graduated |

=== Incoming ===
North Dakota incoming transfers
| Name | Num | Pos. | Height | Year | Hometown | Previous school |
|---|---|---|---|---|---|---|
| Destinee Oberg | 23 | C | 6' 3" | GS senior | Burnsville, MN | Minnesota |
| Jayla Owen | 44 | G | 5' 6" | Sophomore | Dorval, QC | Western Nebraska CC |

==== Recruiting ====
There was no recruiting class of 2023.

== Roster ==
2023–24 North Dakota Fighting Hawks women's basketball team
Players
Coaches

| Pos. | # | Name | Height | Year | Previous school | Hometown |
|---|---|---|---|---|---|---|
| G | 0 | DJ Davis | 5 ft 6 in (1.68 m) | Sr | Red Oak HS; Wabash Valley College | Dallas, TX |
| F | 1 | Paris Bass | 5 ft 11 in (1.8 m) | Fr | Wayne Memorial HS | Detroit, MI |
| G | 2 | Mikayla Aumer | 5 ft 9 in (1.75 m) | So | Cambridge-Isanti HS | Mora, MN |
| F | 5 | Kiyah Hurst | 5 ft 11 in (1.8 m) | So | Milwaukee Academy of Science | Milwaukee, WI |
| F | 7 | Nevaeh Ferrara Home | 6 ft 2 in (1.88 m) | Fr | Southwest Academy | Regina, SK |
| F | 9 | Kiera Pemberton | 6 ft 1 in (1.85 m) | Fr | Walnut Grove Secondary | Langley, BC |
| C | 10 | Fatima Ibrahim | 6 ft 3 in (1.91 m) | Fr | Royal Crown School (ON) | Winnipeg, MB |
| G | 11 | Kacie Borowicz | 5 ft 9 in (1.75 m) | GS | Roseau HS | Roseau, MN |
| G | 13 | Mahogany Cottingham | 5 ft 8 in (1.73 m) | Fr | Parma HS | Parma, OH |
| G/F | 21 | Sammiyah Hoskin | 5 ft 10 in (1.78 m) | GS | Wayne Memorial HS; Detroit Mercy | Detroit, MI |
| G | 22 | Rakiyah Beal | 5 ft 11 in (1.8 m) | So | Hamtramck HS | Detroit, MI |
| C | 23 | Destinee Oberg | 6 ft 3 in (1.91 m) | GS | John F. Kennedy HS; Minnesota | Burnsville, MN |
| C | 33 | Miranda VanderWal | 6 ft 7 in (2.01 m) | RS So | Southwest Academy | Strathroy, ON |
| G | 44 | Jayla Owen | 5 ft 6 in (1.68 m) | So | Dawson College; Western Nebraska CC | Dorval, QC |
| C | 55 | Darcy Jardine | 6 ft 4 in (1.93 m) | So | Cheyenne East HS | Cheyenne, WY |

Head coach

- Mallory Bernhard (North Dakota)

Assistant coach(es)

- Travis Bledsoe (North Dakota)
- John Motherwell (Michigan)
- Sabra Wimberley (LeMoyne–Owen)

Legend

- (C) Team captain
- (S) Suspended
- (I) Ineligible
- (W) Walk-on
- Injured
- Current redshirt

Roster
Last update: November 8, 2025

== Schedule and results ==
| Date time, TV | Rank^{#} | Opponent^{#} | Result | Record | High points | High rebounds | High assists | Site (attendance) city, state |
Regular season
| November 6, 2023*; 7:30 p.m. | | at Wyoming | L 60–77 | 0–1 | 29 – Borowicz | 9 – Beal | 4 – Davis | Arena-Auditorium (2,284); Laramie, WY |
| November 11, 2023*; 7:00 p.m., MidcoSN2/SLN | | Grand Canyon | L 61–73 | 0–2 | 20 – Borowicz | 11 – Pemberton | 4 – Borowicz | Betty Engelstad Sioux Center (1,423); Grand Forks, ND |
| November 15, 2023*; 7:00 p.m., SLN | | Concordia College | W 80–47 | 1–2 | 22 – Borowicz | 8 – Pemberton | 3 – Davis | Betty Engelstad Sioux Center (1,374); Grand Forks, ND |
| November 19, 2023*; 12:00 p.m., MidcoSN2/SLN | | Montana State | L 53–60 | 1–3 | 22 – Borowicz | 10 – Hurst | 3 – Borowicz | Betty Engelstad Sioux Center (1,169); Grand Forks, ND |
| November 24, 2023*; 11:00 a.m., ESPN+ | | at Southern Miss; Lady Eagle Thanksgiving Classic | L 53–75 | 1–4 | 16 – Borowicz | 9 – Pemberton | 4 – Borowicz | Reed Green Coliseum (1,366); Hattiesburg, MS |
| November 25, 2023*; 8:00 a.m., ESPN+ | | vs. North Texas; Lady Eagle Thanksgiving Classic | L 50–71 | 1–5 | 12 – Hurst | 6 – Owen | 3 – 2 tied | Reed Green Coliseum (56); Hattiesburg, MS |
| November 28, 2023*; 5:00 p.m., SLN | | Minot State | W 82–53 | 2–5 | 26 – Hurst | 8 – Hurst | 3 – 3 tied | Betty Engelstad Sioux Center; Grand Forks, ND |
| December 3, 2023*; 5:00 p.m., MidcoSN/SLN | | Eastern Michigan | W 64–56 | 3–5 | 20 – Hurst | 9 – Hurst | 3 – Hurst | Betty Engelstad Sioux Center (1,349); Grand Forks, ND |
| December 7, 2023*; 12:00 p.m., ESPN+ | | at Eastern Illinois | L 55–67 | 3–6 | 13 – Ferrara Horne | 8 – Pemberton | 2 – 4 tied | Lantz Arena (2,546); Charleston, IL |
| December 15, 2023*; 7:00 p.m., SLN | | Mayville State | L 68–75 | 3–7 | 16 – Borowicz | 9 – Borowicz | 7 – Borowicz | Betty Engelstad Sioux Center (1,322); Grand Forks, ND |
| December 21, 2023*; 12:00 p.m., MidcoSN/SLN | | Drake | L 60–108 | 3–8 | 29 – Borowicz | 5 – 2 tied | 4 – Borowicz | Betty Engelstad Sioux Center (1,361); Grand Forks, ND |
| December 29, 2023; 1:00 p.m., SLN | | at St. Thomas (MN) | L 76–95 | 3–9 (0–1) | 32 – Borowicz | 5 – 2 tied | 4 – Hoskin | Schoenecker Arena (435); St. Paul, MN |
| December 31, 2023; 12:00 p.m., CBSSN | | South Dakota State | L 53–74 | 3–10 (0–2) | 17 – Borowicz | 10 – VanderWal | 2 – Hoskin | Betty Engelstad Sioux Center (1,214); Grand Forks, ND |
| January 3, 2024*; 8:00 p.m., ESPN+ | | at Idaho State; Summit League–Big Sky Challenge | W 78–72 | 4–10 | 18 – VanderWal | 7 – VanderWal | 5 – Borowicz | Reed Arena (711); Pocatello, ID |
| January 6, 2024*; 1:00 p.m., MidcoSN/SLN | | Eastern Washington; Summit League–Big Sky Challenge | L 65–72 | 4–11 | 17 – Borowicz | 9 – Hoskin | 5 – 3 tied | Betty Engelstad Sioux Center (1,316); Grand Forks, ND |
| January 11, 2024; 7:00 p.m., MidcoSN2/SLN | | Omaha | W 100–75 | 5–11 (1–2) | 22 – Hurst | 12 – Borowicz | 10 – Borowicz | Betty Engelstad Sioux Center (1,127); Grand Forks, ND |
| January 13, 2024; 1:00 p.m., MidcoSN/SLN | | Kansas City | W 76–62 | 6–11 (2–2) | 27 – Pemberton | 7 – Borowicz | 3 – 2 tied | Betty Engelstad Sioux Center (1,405); Grand Forks, ND |
| January 18, 2024; 7:00 p.m., SLN | | at Oral Roberts | L 55–71 | 6–12 (2–3) | 19 – Borowicz | 11 – Borowicz | 2 – 2 tied | Mabee Center (1,074); Tulsa, OK |
| January 20, 2024; 2:00 p.m., SLN | | at Denver | W 78–68 | 7–12 (3–3) | 21 – Borowicz | 12 – Hurst | 7 – Borowicz | Hamilton Gymnasium (545); Denver, CO |
| January 27, 2024; 1:00 p.m., MidcoSN/SLN | | St. Thomas (MN) | L 66–76 | 7–13 (3–4) | 24 – Borowicz | 9 – 2 tied | 2 – Borowicz | Betty Engelstad Sioux Center (1,290); Grand Forks, ND |
| February 1, 2024; 7:00 p.m., MidcoSN2/SLN | | South Dakota | L 53–69 | 7–14 (3–5) | 19 – Borowicz | 10 – Borowicz | 4 – Borowicz | Betty Engelstad Sioux Center (1,366); Grand Forks, ND |
| February 3, 2024; 1:00 p.m., SLN | | North Dakota State | L 85–101 | 7–15 (3–6) | 27 – Borowicz | 8 – Pemberton | 7 – Borowicz | Betty Engelstad Sioux Center (2,913); Grand Forks, ND |
| February 8, 2024; 7:00 p.m., SLN | | at Omaha | W 83–81 | 8–15 (4–6) | 18 – 2 tied | 9 – Borowicz | 5 – Borowicz | Baxter Arena (394); Omaha, NE |
| February 10, 2024; 2:00 p.m., SLN | | at Kansas City | L 71–86 | 8–16 (4–7) | 25 – Borowicz | 6 – 2 tied | 6 – Borowicz | Swinney Recreation Center (735); Kansas City, MO |
| February 15, 2024; 7:00 p.m., MidcoSN/SLN | | Denver | W 75–65 | 9–16 (5–7) | 27 – Hurst | 11 – Hurst | 4 – 2 tied | Betty Engelstad Sioux Center (1,232); Grand Forks, ND |
| February 17, 2024; 1:00 p.m., MidcoSN2/SLN | | North Dakota | L 57–102 | 9–17 (5–8) | 15 – Hurst | 11 – Pemberton | 3 – Beal | Betty Engelstad Sioux Center (1,315); Grand Forks, ND |
| February 24, 2024; 4:00 p.m., SLN | | at North Dakota State | L 80–107 | 9–18 (5–9) | 21 – Evans | 7 – Krzewinski | 5 – Hamling | Scheels Center (2,502); Fargo, ND |
| February 29, 2024; 7:00 p.m., MidcoSN2/SLN | | at South Dakota State | L 47–103 | 9–19 (5–10) | 23 – Borowicz | 7 – Pemberton | 1 – 3 tied | Frost Arena (2,134); Brookings, SD |
| March 2, 2024; 2:00 p.m., SLN | | at South Dakota | L 54–65 | 9–20 (5–11) | 25 – Borowicz | 11 – Pemberton | 2 – 2 tied | Sanford Coyote Sports Center (1,792); Vermillion, SD |
Summit League women's tournament
| March 10, 2024; 12:30 p.m., SLN | (6) | vs. (3) Oral Roberts; Quarterfinals | L 68–91 | 9–21 | 26 – Borowicz | 10 – Hurst | 5 – 2 tied | Denny Sanford Premier Center (8,061); Sioux Falls, SD |
*Non-conference game. ^{#}Rankings from AP poll. (#) Tournament seedings in parentheses. All times are in Central.

== See also ==
- 2023–24 North Dakota Fighting Hawks men's basketball team
