= 2023–24 Kansas City Roos women's basketball team =

American college basketball season

2023–24 Kansas City Roos women's basketball
- Conference: Summit League
- Record: 12–20 (3–13 The Summit)
- Head coach: Dionnah Jackson-Durrett (2nd season)
- Associate head coach: Paul Fessler
- Assistant coaches: Velaida Harris; Alexis Lawrence
- Home arena: Swinney Recreation Center

2023–24 Summit League women's basketball standings
	Conf.				Overall
Team	W		L	PCT	W		L	PCT
South Dakota State †	16	–	0	1.000	27	–	6	.818
North Dakota State	13	–	3	.813	22	–	12	.647
Oral Roberts	11	–	5	.688	21	–	11	.656
South Dakota	9	–	7	.563	23	–	13	.639
St. Thomas*	7	–	9	.438	15	–	16	.484
North Dakota	5	–	11	.313	9	–	21	.300
Denver	5	–	11	.313	8	–	22	.267
Kansas City	3	–	13	.188	12	–	20	.375
Omaha	3	–	13	.188	8	–	23	.258
† 2024 Summit League tournament winner * Ineligible for the 2024 NCAA tournament due to transition from Division III

The 2023–24 Kansas City Roos women's basketball team represented the University of Missouri–Kansas City in the 2023–24 NCAA Division I women's basketball season. The Roos, led by second-year head coach Dionnah Jackson-Durrett, competed in the Summit League. They played their home games at Swinney Recreation Center in Kansas City, Missouri.

== Previous season ==
The Roos finished the 2022–23 season 9–25, 3–15 in Summit League play, to finish in last place. As the No. 10 seed in the Summit League tournament, they defeated Denver in the first round and North Dakota State in the quarterfinals before losing to Omaha in the semifinals.

== Offseason ==
=== Departures ===
Kansas City departures
Name	Num	Pos.	Height	Year	Hometown	Reason for departure
E'Lease Stafford	0	G/F	6' 0"	GS senior	Lawrence, KS	Graduated
Manna Mensah	4	G	5' 8"	GS senior	Toronto, ON	Graduated
Machia Mullens	11	F	6' 0"	Junior	Liberal, KS	TBD
Ava Murphy	12	G	5' 11"	Sophomore	Liberty, MO	Transferred to Ave Maria
Sanna' St. Andre	20	G	5' 8"	Junior	Oakdale, LA	Transferred to Tennessee State
Rain Green	23	G	5' 8"	(redshirt) Sophomore	Baltimore, MD	TBD
Trinity Moreland	44	C	6' 2"	Freshman	Charlotte, NC	Transferred to Gardner–Webb

=== Incoming ===
Kansas City incoming transfers
Name	Num	Pos.	Height	Year	Hometown	Previous school
Alayna Contreras	3	G	5' 6"	Sophomore	Minneapolis, MN	Cochise College
Dominique Phillips	4	F	5' 11"	GS senior	Goodyear, AZ	Grand Canyon
Nariyah Simmons	5	G	5' 5"	Junior	Florissant, MO	Johnson City CC
Kelby Bannerman	11	F	6' 1"	Junior	Hampshire, IL	Davidson
Dayshawna Carter	12	G	5' 7"	Junior	Brooklyn, NY	Garden City CC
Ifunanya Nwachukwu	13	G/F	6' 2'	Junior	Lagos, Nigeria	Chipola College
Lisa Thomas	21	G	5' 6"	Junior	Kansas City, MO	Johnson City CC
Zanaa Cordis	44	F	6' 3"	Junior	Junction City, KS	New Orleans

==== Recruiting ====
There was no recruiting class of 2023.

== Roster ==
2023–24 Kansas City Roos women's basketball team
Players
Coaches

Pos.	#	Name	Height	Year	Previous school	Hometown
G	0	Emani Bennett	5 ft 11 in (1.8 m)	Fr	Lee's Summit North HS	Lee's Summit, MO
G	1	Raychel Jones	5 ft 7 in (1.7 m)	Fr	Vashon HS	St. Louis, MO
G	2	Elauni Bennett	5 ft 9 in (1.75 m)	Fr	Lee's Summit North HS	Lee's Summit, MO
G	3	Alayna Contreras	5 ft 6 in (1.68 m)	So	Hopkins HS; Cochise College	Minneapolis, MN
F	4	Dominique Phillips	5 ft 10 in (1.78 m)	GS	Millennium HS; Grand Canyon	Goodyear, AZ
F	5	Tamia Ugass	6 ft 3 in (1.91 m)	Jr	Roseville Area Sr HS; Johnson City CC	St. Paul, MN
G	10	Nariyah Simmons	5 ft 5 in (1.65 m)	Jr	Vashon HS	St. Louis, MO
F	11	Kelby Bannerman	6 ft 1 in (1.85 m)	Jr	Hampshire HS; Davidson	Hampshire, IL
G	12	Dayshawna Carter	5 ft 7 in (1.7 m)	Jr	Victory Collegiate HS; Garden City CC	Harlem, NY
F	13	Ifunanya Nwachukwu	6 ft 2 in (1.88 m)	GS	Topfield College; Chipola College	Lagos, Nigeria
G	21	Lisa Thomas	5 ft 5 in (1.65 m)	Jr	Center HS; Johnson City CC	Kansas City, MO
G	24	Zaire Harrell	5 ft 8 in (1.73 m)	So	MICDS	St. Louis, MO
F	41	Jocelyn Ewell	6 ft 2 in (1.88 m)	Sr	Santa Margarita Catholic HS	Mission Viejo, CA
F/C	44	Zanaa Cordis	6 ft 3 in (1.91 m)	Jr	Manhattan HS; New Orleans	Junction City, KS

Head coach

- Dionnah Jackson-Durrett (Oklahoma)

Assistant coach(es)

- Paul Fessler (Northern Iowa)
- Velaida Harris (Portland State)
- Alexis Lawrence (UMSL)

Legend

- (C) Team captain
- (S) Suspended
- (I) Ineligible
- (W) Walk-on
- Injured
- Current redshirt

Roster
Last update: February 22, 2025

== Schedule and results ==
Date time, TV	Rank^{#}	Opponent^{#}	Result	Record	High points	High rebounds	High assists	Site (attendance) city, state
Exhibition
October 28, 2023*; 12:00 p.m.		Ottawa	W 95–59		–	–	–	Swinney Recreation Center; Kansas City, MO
Regular season
November 6, 2023*; 11:00 a.m., SLN		Bradley	W 73–66	1–0	19 – Contreras	12 – Nwachukwu	5 – Contreras	Swinney Recreation Center (1,203); Kansas City, MO
November 11, 2023*; 5:00 p.m., ESPN+		at UTEP	L 60–62	1–1	15 – Simmons	8 – 2 tied	3 – Contreras	Don Haskins Center (1,093); El Paso, TX
November 14, 2023*; 7:00 p.m., SLN		Utah State	L 60–62	1–2	14 – Simmons	6 – 3 tied	5 – Thomas	Swinney Recreation Center (462); Kansas City, MO
November 18, 2023*; 3:30 p.m.		vs. Kansas; 28.5 Hoops Invitational	L 61–70	1–3	34 – Simmons	6 – Harrell	3 – Thomas	Municipal Auditorium (867); Kansas City, MO
November 22, 2023*; 12:00 p.m.		vs. Chicago State; Viking Invitational	W 77–46	2–3	17 – Contreras	7 – Em. Bennett	3 – Contreras	Wolstein Center; Cleveland, OH
November 24, 2023*; 3:00 p.m.		vs. Austin Peay; Viking Invitational	L 63–78	2–4	20 – Em. Bennett	4 – 3 tied	5 – Thomas	Wolstein Center (380); Cleveland, OH
November 25, 2023*; 3:00 p.m., ESPN+		at Cleveland State; Viking Invitational	L 55–82	2–5	11 – Phillips	7 – Phillips	4 – Thomas	Wolstein Center (374); Cleveland, OH
December 2, 2023*; 2:00 p.m., SLN		Arkansas State	W 62–57	3–5	16 – Simmons	7 – Phillips	5 – Simmons	Swinney Recreation Center (544); Kansas City, MO
December 6, 2023*; 5:30 p.m., SLN		Bellevue	W 84–34	4–5	14 – Nwachukwu	11 – Ugass	3 – 4 tied	Swinney Recreation Center (391); Kansas City, MO
December 10, 2023*; 2:00 p.m., SLN		Western Illinois	W 68–60	5–5	20 – Em. Bennett	8 – Phillips	6 – Contreras	Swinney Recreation Center (561); Kansas City, MO
December 14, 2023*; 7:00 p.m., SLN		Alabama A&M	W 57–52	6–5	11 – Simmons	9 – Ugass	3 – Thomas	Swinney Recreation Center (530); Kansas City, MO
December 18, 2023*; 7:00 p.m., SLN		Kansas Christian	W 121–37	7–5	20 – Jones	14 – Nwachukwu	8 – Thomas	Swinney Recreation Center (408); Kansas City, MO
December 21, 2023*; 7:00 p.m., SECN+/ESPN+		at Missouri	L 42–85	7–6	14 – Phillips	6 – Em. Bennett	3 – Ugass	Mizzou Arena (4,152); Columbia, MO
December 29, 2023; 7:00 p.m., SLN		at Oral Roberts	L 61–76	7–7 (0–1)	15 – Em. Bennett	16 – Nwachukwu	3 – Contreras	Mabee Center (1,335); Tulsa, OK
December 31, 2023; 2:00 p.m., SLN		St. Thomas (MN)	L 57–66	7–8 (0–2)	12 – Simmons	4 – 2 tied	3 – Simmons	Swinney Recreation Center (472); Kansas City, MO
January 3, 2024*; 7:00 p.m., SLN		Portland State; Big Sky–Summit Challenge	W 75–56	8–8	11 – Em. Bennett	6 – 2 tied	5 – Thomas	Swinney Recreation Center (374); Kansas City, MO
January 6, 2024*; 1:00 p.m., ESPN+		at Weber State; Big Sky–Summit Challenge	W 61–51	9–8	20 – Contreras	6 – 2 tied	2 – 3 tied	Dee Events Center (356); Ogden, UT
January 11, 2023; 7:00 p.m., SLN		at North Dakota State	L 60–63	9–9 (0–3)	15 – Contreras	6 – Ugass	4 – Contreras	Scheels Center (1,027); Fargo, ND
January 13, 2024; 1:00 p.m., SLN		at North Dakota	L 62–76	9–10 (0–4)	13 – Simmons	10 – Ugass	5 – Simmons	Betty Engelstad Sioux Center (1,405); Grand Forks, ND
January 20, 2024; 2:00 p.m., SLN		Omaha	W 88–74	10–10 (1–4)	9 – Simmons	5 – 3 tied	3 – Contreras	Swinney Recreation Center (292); Kansas City, MO
January 25, 2024; 7:00 p.m., SLN		South Dakota State	L 49–72	10–11 (1–5)	23 – Phillips	8 – Phillips	8 – Contreras	Swinney Recreation Center (559); Kansas City, MO
January 27, 2024; 2:00 p.m., SLN		at South Dakota	L 62–72	10–12 (1–6)	24 – Contreras	9 – Nwachukwu	5 – Contreras	Sanford Coyote Sports Center (2,606); Vermillion, SD
February 1, 2024; 7:00 p.m., SLN		at Denver	L 50–65	10–13 (1–7)	13 – Contreras	8 – Nwachukwu	2 – 2 tied	Hamilton Gymnasium (245); Denver, CO
February 3, 2024; 12:00 p.m., SLN		at St. Thomas (MN)	L 55–75	10–14 (1–8)	13 – 2 tied	11 – Bannerman	4 – 2 tied	Schoenecker Arena (445); St. Paul, MN
February 8, 2024; 7:00 p.m., SLN		North Dakota State	L 59–70	10–15 (1–9)	15 – Phillips	6 – El. Bennett	4 – Phillips	Swinney Recreation Center (582); Kansas City, MO
February 10, 2024; 2:00 p.m., SLN		North Dakota	W 86–71	11–15 (2–9)	26 – Em. Bennett	11 – Nwachukwu	10 – Thomas	Swinney Recreation Center (735); Kansas City, MO
February 15, 2024; 7:00 p.m., SLN		at South Dakota State	L 53–74	11–16 (2–10)	12 – Contreras	6 – Bannerman	5 – Thomas	Frost Arena (1,828); Brookings, SD
February 22, 2024; 7:00 p.m., SLN		South Dakota	L 60–74	11–17 (2–11)	16 – Bannerman	6 – Bannerman	6 – Simmons	Swinney Recreation Center (470); Kansas City, MO
February 24, 2024; 2:00 p.m., SLN		at Omaha	W 72–56	12–17 (3–11)	15 – 2 tied	9 – Phillips	5 – Thomas	Baxter Arena (404); Omaha, NE
February 29, 2024; 7:00 p.m., SLN		Denver	L 60–74	12–18 (3–12)	23 – Simmons	5 – 2 tied	6 – Contreras	Swinney Recreation Center (771); Kansas City, MO
March 2, 2024; 2:00 p.m., SLN		Oral Roberts	L 56–94	12–19 (3–13)	15 – Phillips	11 – Phillips	2 – 2 tied	Swinney Recreation Center (605); Kansas City, MO
Summit League women's tournament
March 8, 2024; 4:30 p.m., SLN	(8)	vs. (9) Omaha; First round	L 55–61	12–20	18 – Em. Bennett	5 – 2 tied	4 – Contreras	Denny Sanford Premier Center; Sioux Falls, SD
*Non-conference game. ^{#}Rankings from AP poll. (#) Tournament seedings in parentheses. All times are in Central.

== See also ==
- 2023–24 Kansas City Roos men's basketball team
