= 2023–24 North Dakota State Bison women's basketball team =

College women's basketball season

2023–24 North Dakota State Bison women's basketball

WNIT Super 16
- Conference: Summit League
- Record: 22–12 (13–3 Summit)
- Head coach: Jory Collins (5th season)
- Associate head coach: Dylan Geissert
- Assistant coaches: Jaime Adams; Michaela Crall
- Home arena: Scheels Center

2023–24 Summit League women's basketball standings
| | Conf. | | | | Overall |
| Team | W | | L | PCT | W | | L | PCT |
|---|---|---|---|---|---|---|---|---|
| South Dakota State † | 16 | – | 0 | 1.000 | 27 | – | 6 | .818 |
| North Dakota State | 13 | – | 3 | .813 | 22 | – | 12 | .647 |
| Oral Roberts | 11 | – | 5 | .688 | 21 | – | 11 | .656 |
| South Dakota | 9 | – | 7 | .563 | 23 | – | 13 | .639 |
| St. Thomas* | 7 | – | 9 | .438 | 15 | – | 16 | .484 |
| North Dakota | 5 | – | 11 | .313 | 9 | – | 21 | .300 |
| Denver | 5 | – | 11 | .313 | 8 | – | 22 | .267 |
| Kansas City | 3 | – | 13 | .188 | 12 | – | 20 | .375 |
| Omaha | 3 | – | 13 | .188 | 8 | – | 23 | .258 |
† 2024 Summit League tournament winner * Ineligible for the 2024 NCAA tournament due to transition from Division III

The 2023–24 North Dakota State Bison women's basketball team represented North Dakota State University during the 2023–24 NCAA Division I women's basketball season. The Bison, led by fifth year head coach Jory Collins, played their home games at the Scheels Center, as members of the Summit League.
NDSU made the 2024 Summit League women's basketball tournament as the 2 seed for the second year in a row, and after beating Denver and Oral Roberts in the quarterfinals and semifinals - they achieved 20 wins for the first time since 2004. The Bison would make their first Summit League title game, falling to South Dakota State.
North Dakota State made the 2024 Women's National Invitation Tournament as an at-large team, and received a first round bye. They defeated Montana in the second round in their first home postseason game since 2000, which was their first postseason win in the Division I era. The Bison would fall in the WNIT Super 16 to Minnesota.

== Previous season ==
The Bison finished the 2022–23 season 18–12, 12–6 in Summit League play to finish in second place. This was NDSU's second best finish since entering Division I. The Bison lost to tenth seeded Kansas City in the quarterfinals in the Summit League tournament. However, given their second-place finish in the conference, the Bison were automatically invited to the 2023 Women's National Invitation Tournament. NDSU would fall to Oregon in the first round, 96–57.

== Offseason ==
=== Departures ===
| Name | Number | Pos. | Height | Year | Hometown | Reason for departure |
|---|---|---|---|---|---|---|
| Georgia Baldwin | 4 | F | 6'0" | Junior | Melbourne, Australia | Unknown |
| Rachel Novak | 13 | G | 5'9" | Junior | Fort Collins, Colorado | Graduated |
| Taylor Brown | 14 | F | 6'1" | Senior | Lakeville, Minnesota | Graduated |
| Emily Behnke | 20 | F | 6'2" | Junior | Two Rivers, Wisconsin | Graduated |
| Sophie Olson | 32 | G | 5'11" | Sophomore | El Dorado Hills, California | Unknown |
| Katie Hildebrandt | 33 | F | 6'2" | Sophomore | McFarland, Wisconsin | Unknown |

=== 2023 recruiting class ===
College recruiting information
| Name | Hometown | School | Height | Weight | Commit date |
|---|---|---|---|---|---|
| Taryn Hamling; G | Grand Rapids, Minnesota | Grand Rapids High School | 5 ft 9 in (1.75 m) | N/A | Nov 4, 2020 |
| Taryn Hamling; G | Recruit ratings: Scout: Rivals: 247Sports: ESPN: (0) | | | | |
| Avery Koenen; F | Montevideo, Minnesota | Montevideo High School | 6 ft 2 in (1.88 m) | N/A | Nov 9, 2022 |
| Avery Koenen; F | Recruit ratings: Scout: Rivals: 247Sports: ESPN: (0) | | | | |
| Miriley Simon; F | West Fargo, North Dakota | West Fargo High School | 6 ft 1 in (1.85 m) | N/A | Nov 9, 2022 |
| Miriley Simon; F | Recruit ratings: Scout: Rivals: 247Sports: ESPN: (0) | | | | |
| Abby Krzewinski; G | Wayzata, Minnesota | Wayzata High School | 5 ft 11 in (1.80 m) | N/A | Nov 9, 2022 |
| Abby Krzewinski; G | Recruit ratings: Scout: Rivals: 247Sports: ESPN: (0) | | | | |
Overall recruit ranking:
Note: In many cases, Scout, Rivals, 247Sports, On3, and ESPN may conflict in their listings of height and weight.; In these cases, the average was taken. ESPN grades are on a 100-point scale.; Sources: "2023 Team Ranking". Rivals.

== Roster ==
2023–24 North Dakota State Bison women's basketball team
Players
Coaches

| Pos. | # | Name | Height | Year | Hometown |
|---|---|---|---|---|---|
| F | 2 | Abbie Draper | 6 ft 2 in (1.88 m) | Jr | Waverly, IA |
| G | 3 | Leah Mackenzie | 5 ft 8 in (1.73 m) | RS Fr | Melbourne, AUS |
| G | 10 | Abby Graham | 5 ft 10 in (1.78 m) | So | Portland, OR |
| G | 11 | Heaven Hamling | 5 ft 8 in (1.73 m) | Sr | Grand Rapids, MN |
| G | 12 | Taryn Hamling | 5 ft 9 in (1.75 m) | Fr | Grand Rapids, MN |
| G | 21 | Elle Evans | 6 ft 3 in (1.91 m) | So | Edwardsville, IL |
| F | 22 | Avery Koenen | 6 ft 2 in (1.88 m) | Fr | Montevideo, MN |
| G | 24 | Abby Schulte | 5 ft 10 in (1.78 m) | Sr | Maple Grove, MN |
| F | 32 | Miriley Simon | 6 ft 1 in (1.85 m) | Fr | West Fargo, ND |
| G | 40 | Abby Krzewinski | 5 ft 11 in (1.8 m) | Fr | Wayzata, MN |

Head coach

- Jory Collins (Emporia State)

Assistant coach(es)

- Dylan Geissert (Emporia State)
- Jaime Adams (North Dakota State)
- Michaela Everett (Wisconsin)
- Emily Dietz (North Dakota State)

Legend

- (C) Team captain
- (S) Suspended
- (I) Ineligible
- (W) Walk-on
- Injured
- Current redshirt

Roster
Last update: January 3, 2024

== Schedule and results ==
| Date time, TV | Rank^{#} | Opponent^{#} | Result | Record | High points | High rebounds | High assists | Site (attendance) city, state |
Regular season
| November 6, 2023*; 6:00 pm | | vs. No. 22 Creighton | L 52–75 | 0–1 | 10 – Evans | 4 – Tied | 3 – Krzewinski | Sanford Pentagon (1,405); Sioux Falls, SD |
| November 9, 2023*; 5:00 pm, WDAY Xtra/Summit League Network | | Jamestown | W 112–59 | 1–1 | 16 – H. Hamling | 7 – Draper | 6 – Evans | Scheels Center (611); Fargo, ND |
| November 15, 2023*; 7:00 pm | | at Minnesota | L 53–75 | 1–2 | 12 – H. Hamling | 10 – H. Hamling | 3 – Tied | Williams Arena (2,816); Minneapolis, MN |
| November 20, 2023*; 7:00 pm, ESPN+ | | at Northern Colorado | W 67–60 | 2–2 | 19 – Draper | 5 – Evans | 3 – Tied | Bank of Colorado Arena (587); Greeley, CO |
| November 24, 2023*; 4:30 pm | | vs. Harvard; San Diego Classic | L 64–69 | 2–3 | 17 – Draper | 7 – H. Hamling | 3 – Tied | Jenny Craig Pavilion; San Diego, CA |
| November 25, 2023*; 2:00 pm | | vs. Toledo; San Diego Classic | L 58–73 | 2–4 | 15 – Evans | 6 – Evans | 4 – Koenen | Jenny Craig Pavilion (207); San Diego, CA |
| December 1, 2023*; 7:00 pm, WDAY Xtra/SLN | | Eastern Michigan | W 93–73 | 3–4 | 23 – Hamling | 10 – Hamling | 5 – Evans | Scheels Center (613); Fargo, ND |
| December 3, 2023*; 1:00 pm, WDAY Xtra/SLN | | Mayville State | W 91–68 | 4–4 | 18 – T. Hamling | 15 – Koenen | 6 – Evans | Scheels Center (665); Fargo, ND |
| December 8, 2023*; 11:00 am, ESPN+ | | at Drake | L 66–77 | 4–5 | 15 – H. Hamling | 5 – Tied | 2 – Krzewinksi | Knapp Center (6,424); Des Moines, IA |
| December 10, 2023*; 5:00 pm, Big 12 on ESPN+ | | at Iowa State | L 59–89 | 4–6 | 18 – H. Hamling | 6 – Evans | 6 – H. Hamling | Hilton Coliseum (9,808); Ames, IA |
| December 20, 2023*; 7:00 pm, WDAY Xtra/SLN | | Central Michigan | W 67–57 | 5–6 | 16 – Draper | 6 – Evans | 5 – Schulte | Scheels Center (608); Fargo, ND |
| December 29, 2023; 7:00 pm, SLN | | at South Dakota | W 84–69 | 6–6 (1–0) | 24 – H. Hamling | 10 – Evans | 6 – Schulte | Sanford Coyote Sports Center (1,818); Vermillion, SD |
| January 3, 2024*; 6:30 pm, ESPN+ | | at Montana State; Big Sky–Summit Challenge | L 45–65 | 6–7 | 13 – Draper | 10 – Koenen | 2 – Tied | Brick Breeden Fieldhouse (1,532); Bozeman, MT |
| January 6, 2024*; 1:00 pm, WDAY Xtra/SLN | | Northern Arizona; Big Sky–Summit Challenge | W 99–73 | 7–7 | 25 – Evans | 6 – Tied | 5 – Tied | Scheels Center (751); Fargo, ND |
| January 11, 2024; 7:00 pm, WDAY Xtra/SLN | | Kansas City | W 63–60 | 8–7 (2–0) | 18 – Draper | 7 – Koenen | 3 – Draper | Scheels Center (1,027); Fargo, ND |
| January 13, 2024; 1:00 pm, WDAY Xtra/SLN | | Omaha | W 87–69 | 9–7 (3–0) | 17 – Evans | 8 – Tied | 5 – Evans | Scheels Center (673); Fargo, ND |
| January 18, 2024; 7:00 pm, SLN | | at Denver | W 84–63 | 10–7 (4–0) | 22 – Evans | 10 – Evans | 3 – Schulte | Hamilton Gymnasium (268); Denver, CO |
| January 20, 2024; 2:00 pm, SLN | | at Oral Roberts | L 75–84 | 10–8 (4–1) | 23 – Evans | 3 – H. Hamling | 2 – Koenen | Mabee Center (1,327); Tulsa, OK |
| January 25, 2024; 7:00 pm, WDAY Xtra/SLN | | St. Thomas | W 85–52 | 11–8 (5–1) | 29 – Evans | 7 – H. Hamling | 3 – Tied | Scheels Center (523); Fargo, ND |
| February 1, 2024; 7:00 pm, WDAY Xtra/SLN | | South Dakota State | L 58–65 | 11–9 (5–2) | 18 – H. Hamling | 7 – Draper | 3 – Krzewinski | Scheels Center (1,683); Fargo, ND |
| February 3, 2024; 1:00 pm, SLN | | at North Dakota | W 101–85 | 12–9 (6–2) | 33 – Evans | 10 – Evans | 6 – Schulte | Betty Engelstad Sioux Center (2,913); Grand Forks, ND |
| February 8, 2024; 7:00 pm, SLN | | at Kansas City | W 70–59 | 13–9 (7–2) | 15 – H. Hamling | 6 – Koenen | 2 – Tied | Swinney Recreation Center (582); Kansas City, MO |
| February 10, 2024; 2:00 pm | | at Omaha | W 84–70 | 14–9 (8–2) | 16 – Tied | 13 – Draper | 4 – Evans | Baxter Arena (524); Omaha, NE |
| February 15, 2024; 7:00 pm, WDAY Xtra/SLN | | Oral Roberts | W 83–73 | 15–9 (9–2) | 21 – H. Hamling | 10 – Koenen | 5 – H. Hamling | Scheels Center (790); Fargo, ND |
| February 17, 2024; 1:00 pm, WDAY Xtra/SLN | | Denver | W 86–65 | 16–9 (10–2) | 20 – Evans | 7 – Tied | 5 – H. Hamling | Scheels Center (1,255); Fargo, ND |
| February 22, 2024; 7:00 pm, SLN | | at St. Thomas | W 96–53 | 17–9 (11–2) | 22 – Evans | 8 – Draper | 7 – Schulte | Schoenecker Arena (451); St. Paul, MN |
| February 24, 2024; 4:00 pm, WDAY Xtra/SLN | | North Dakota | W 107–80 | 18–9 (12–2) | 21 – Evans | 7 – Krzewinski | 5 – H. Hamling | Scheels Center (2,502); Fargo, ND |
| February 29, 2024; 7:00 pm, WDAY Xtra/SLN | | South Dakota | W 63–53 | 19–9 (13–2) | 15 – Draper | 10 – Koenen | 3 – Schulte | Scheels Center (1,035); Fargo, ND |
| March 2, 2024; 2:00 pm, SLN | | at South Dakota State | L 74–89 | 19–10 (13–3) | 23 – H. Hamling | 7 – Draper | 4 – Schulte | Frost Arena (3,768); Brookings, SD |
Summit League Tournament
| March 9, 2024; 12:30 pm, SLN | (2) | vs. (7) Denver; Quarterfinals | W 72–60 | 20–10 | 25 – H. Hamling | 10 – Koenen | 5 – Schulte | Denny Sanford Premier Center; Sioux Falls, SD |
| March 11, 2024; 3:00 pm, CBSSN | (2) | vs. (3) Oral Roberts; Semifinals | W 75–66 | 21–10 | 18 – Tied | 11 – H. Hamling | 4 – Schulte | Denny Sanford Premier Center (8,107); Sioux Falls, SD |
| March 12, 2024; 3:30 pm, CBSSN | (2) | vs. (1) South Dakota State; Championship | L 54–67 | 21–11 | 16 – H. Hamling | 6 – H. Hamling | 3 – H. Hamling | Denny Sanford Premier Center (7,883); Sioux Falls, SD |
Women's National Invitation Tournament (WNIT)
| March 25, 2024*; 7:00 pm, WDAY Xtra | | Montana; Second Round | W 72–63 | 22–11 | 18 – Draper | 8 – Krzewinksi | 5 – Schulte | Scheels Center (2,254); Fargo, ND |
| March 29, 2024*; 7:00 pm | | at Minnesota; Super 16 | L 65–69 | 22–12 | 18 – Evans | 6 – Evans | 6 – H. Hamling | Williams Arena (2,367); Minneapolis, MN |
*Non-conference game. ^{#}Rankings from AP Poll. (#) Tournament seedings in parentheses. All times are in Central.

== Awards and accolades ==
=== Summit League Player of the Week ===
| Week | Player of the Week | School |
|---|---|---|
| Jan. 29 | Elle Evans | North Dakota State |

=== Summit League Regular Season Awards ===
==== All-Summit League First Team ====
- Elle Evans

==== All-Summit League Second Team ====
- Heaven Hamling

==== Summit League All-Defensive Team ====
- Elle Evans

==== Summit League All-Freshman Team ====
- Abby Krzewinski

=== Summit League All-Tournament Team ===
- Heaven Hamling
- Elle Evans
