= Howe High School (Howe, Oklahoma) =

Coordinates: 34°57′21″N 94°38′05″W

Location
- 21444 East North Railroad Street; Howe, (Le Flore County), Oklahoma 74940; United States

Information
- Type: Public high school
- Principal: Donna Morris
- Staff: 12.61 (FTE)
- Enrollment: 219 (2024-2025)
- Student to teacher ratio: 17.37
- Colors: Red and white
- Nickname: Lions

Howe High School is a secondary school located in the rural town of Howe, Oklahoma. The school educates students in 9th–12th grades.

The mascot of Howe High School is the lion. As of 2017, the school principal is Dennis Shoup. In 2004, their girls basketball team won the Class A state championship. In 2007, the girls basketball team won state runner-up. In 2008, the girls basketball team won the Class A State Championship. Tammy Parks, Carrie Alexander and Scott Parks serve as the Instructional Technology Facilitators for Howe Public Schools.

Howe High School offered a Broadcast Journalism Program called Cle-Live Online. Which has been shut down. They currently have an academic team, an archery team, a basketball team—boys and girls, a softball team—slow pitch and fast pitch, and a baseball team.
