= Rapid City Christian School =

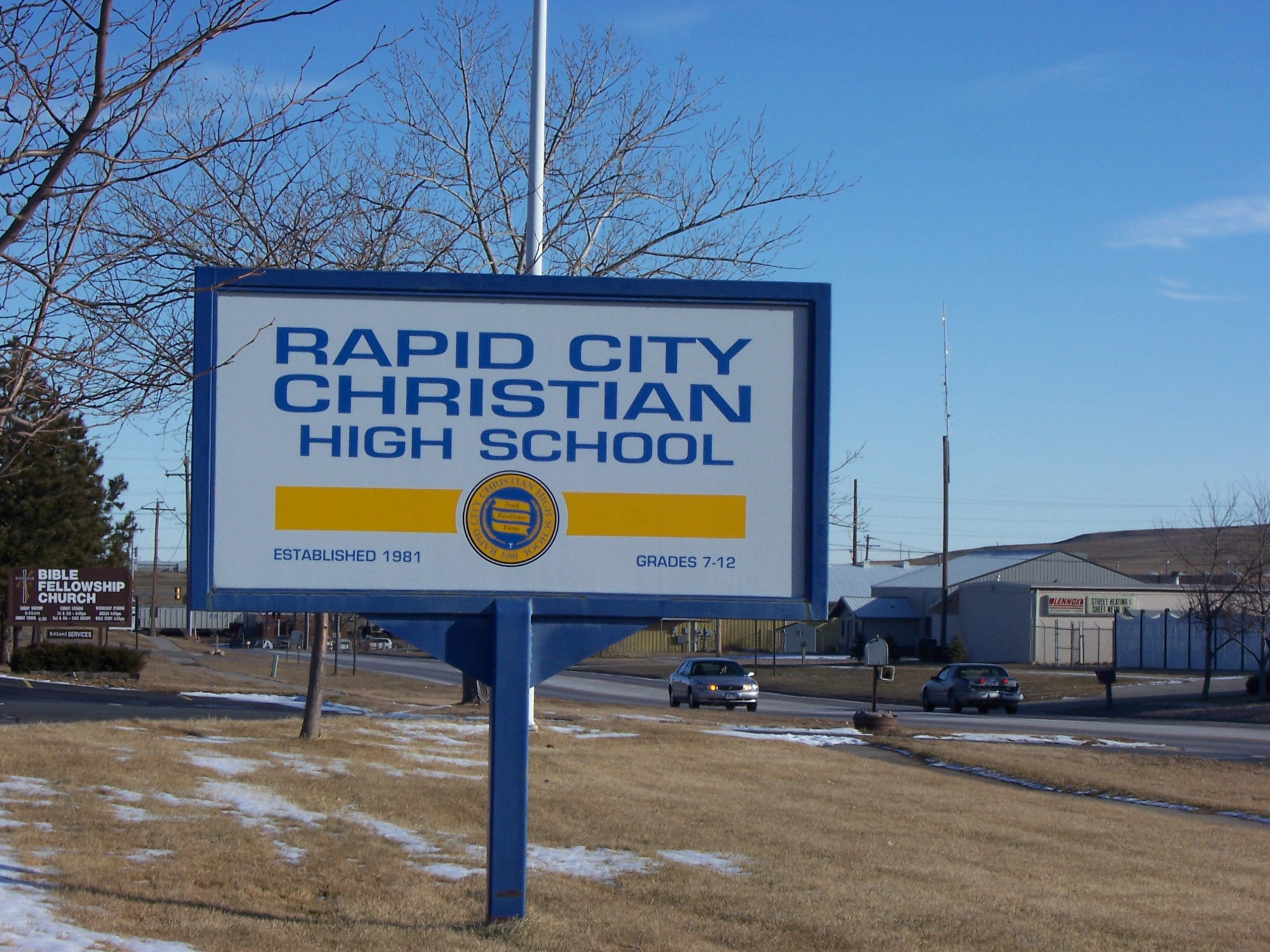
- RCCS's sign at the old location on Fairmont Boulevard

Location
- 23757 Arena Drive; Rapid City, South Dakota 57702; United States; 43°57′37″N 103°13′05″W

Information
- Type: Private school
- Teaching staff: 21.3 (on an FTE basis)
- Grades: 6-12
- Enrollment: 246 (2019-20)
- Student to teacher ratio: 11.5
- Nickname: Comets
- Website: www.rcchristian.org

Rapid City Christian School is a private Christian middle school and high school in Rapid City, South Dakota. It was founded in 1981.

== Student body ==
RCCS serves grades 6-12. 2006/2007 was the first school year for 6th grade students at this school. In 2007–2008, they had 75 students, by 2008-2009 there were 93 students in attendance.

== Move to Hart Ranch ==
Until the end of the 2007 school year, Rapid City Christian was based out of Bible Fellowship Church.

At the end of the 2007 school year, RCCS moved to a new location at Hart Ranch in the location of the former horse arena, and changed its name to Rapid City Christian School. For that year, the building was shared with National American University. In 2008–2009, Rapid City Christian took control of the entire building, but they did not expand into that space immediately.
