= Caddo High School =

Coordinates: 34.1212°N 96.2711°W

Location
- 600 S. McPherren Street; Caddo, Oklahoma 74729; United States

Information
- Type: Co-Educational, Public, Secondary
- Authority: OSDE
- Principal: J.T. Busby
- Teaching staff: 13.22 (FTE)
- Grades: 9–12
- Enrollment: 138 (2024-2025)
- Student to teacher ratio: 10.06
- Colors: White, black, and gold
- Athletics conference: OSSAA Class B-I
- Mascot: Bruin
- Website: http://www.caddoisd.org

Caddo High School is a public secondary school serving students in grades 9–12 in Caddo, Oklahoma, United States. It is part of Caddo Public Schools and is home to the Caddo Bruins.

According to Oklahoma State Department of Education data, the school had an enrollment of 138 students during the 2024–2025 school year.

The school competes in Oklahoma Secondary School Activities Association (OSSAA) athletics. Its football team won the OSSAA Class B state championship in 2011, defeating Davenport 44–14.

== Athletics ==
Caddo offers the following sports to its students:

- Baseball
- Basketball (Boys, Girls)
- Cheerleading
- Cross Country (Boys, Girls)
- Football
- Power Lifting
- Softball
- Track (Boys, Girls)
