= 1999 in basketball =

The following are the basketball events of the year 1999 throughout the world.

== Championships ==
=== Professional ===
- Men
  - 1999 NBA Finals: San Antonio Spurs over the New York Knicks 4-1. MVP: Tim Duncan
    - 1999 NBA Playoffs, 1998-99 NBA season, 1999 NBA draft
  - Eurobasket: Italy 64, Spain 56
- Women
  - WNBA Finals: Houston Comets over the New York Liberty 2-1. MVP: Cynthia Cooper
    - 1999 WNBA Playoffs, 1999 WNBA season, 1999 WNBA draft, 1999 WNBA All-Star Game
  - Eurobasket Women Poland def. France

=== College ===
- Men
  - NCAA Division I: University of Connecticut 77, Duke University 74
  - National Invitation Tournament: University of California, Berkeley 61, Clemson University 60
  - NCAA Division II: Kentucky Wesleyan College 75, Metropolitan State College of Denver 60
  - NCAA Division III: University of Wisconsin-Platteville 76, Hampden-Sydney College 75 2 OTs
  - NAIA Division I: Life University (GA) 63, Mobile (AL) 60
  - NAIA Division II: Cornerstone University(MI) 113, Bethel College (Indiana) (IN) 109 OT
  - NJCAA Division I: Indian Hills CC, Ottumwa, Iowa 100, Barton County CC Great Bend, Kansas 88
- Women
  - NCAA Division I: Purdue University 62, Duke University 45
  - NCAA Division II: North Dakota State University 80, Arkansas Tech University 63
  - NCAA Division III Washington (Mo.) 74, St. Benedict 65
  - NAIA Division I: Oklahoma City University 72, Simon Fraser (BC) 55
  - NAIA Division II Shawnee State University (OH) 80, University of St. Francis 65

=== Preps ===
- USA Today Boys Basketball #1 Ranking: Oak Hill, Mouth of Wilson, Virginia (31-0). Led by Ron Slay and Travis Watson
- USA Today Girls Basketball #1 Ranking: Pickerington, Ohio (27-1). Led by LaToya Turner.

== Awards and honors ==
=== Professional ===
- Men
  - NBA Most Valuable Player Award: Karl Malone
  - NBA Rookie of the Year Award: Vince Carter
  - NBA Defensive Player of the Year Award: Alonzo Mourning
  - NBA Coach of the Year Award: Mike Dunleavy, Portland Trail Blazers
- Women
  - WNBA Most Valuable Player Award: Yolanda Griffith, Sacramento Monarchs
  - WNBA Defensive Player of the Year Award: Yolanda Griffith, Sacramento Monarchs
  - WNBA Rookie of the Year Award: Chamique Holdsclaw, Washington Mystics
  - Kim Perrot Sportsmanship Award: Dawn Staley, Charlotte Sting
  - WNBA Coach of the Year Award: Van Chancellor, Houston Comets
  - WNBA All-Star Game MVP: Lisa Leslie, Los Angeles Sparks
  - WNBA Finals Most Valuable Player Award: Cynthia Cooper, Houston Comets

=== Collegiate ===
- Combined
  - Legends of Coaching Award: Dean Smith, North Carolina
- Men
  - John R. Wooden Award: Elton Brand, Duke
  - Naismith College Coach of the Year: Mike Krzyzewski, Duke
  - Frances Pomeroy Naismith Award: Shawnta Rogers, George Washington
  - Associated Press College Basketball Player of the Year: Elton Brand, Duke
  - NCAA basketball tournament Most Outstanding Player: Mateen Cleaves, Michigan State
  - USBWA National Freshman of the Year: Quentin Richardson, DePaul
  - Associated Press College Basketball Coach of the Year: Cliff Ellis, Auburn
  - Naismith Outstanding Contribution to Basketball: C.M. Newton
- Women
  - Naismith College Player of the Year: Chamique Holdsclaw, Tennessee
  - Naismith College Coach of the Year: Carolyn Peck, Purdue
  - Wade Trophy: Stephanie White, Purdue
  - Frances Pomeroy Naismith Award: Becky Hammon, Colorado State
  - Associated Press Women's College Basketball Player of the Year: Chamique Holdsclaw, Tennessee
  - NCAA basketball tournament Most Outstanding Player: Ukari Figgs, Purdue
  - Carol Eckman Award: Susan Summons, Miami-Dade Community College
  - Associated Press College Basketball Coach of the Year: Carolyn Peck, Purdue
  - Naismith Outstanding Contribution to Basketball: Margaret Wade

=== Naismith Memorial Basketball Hall of Fame ===
- Class of 1999:
  - Wayne R. Embry
  - Kevin E. McHale
  - Billie J. Moore
  - John R. Thompson
  - Fred Zollner

=== Women's Basketball Hall of Fame ===
- Class of 1999:
  - Senda Abbott
  - Lidia Alexeyeva
  - Carol Blazejowski
  - Joanne Bracker
  - Jody Conradt
  - Joan Crawford
  - Denise Curry
  - Anne Donovan
  - Carol Eckman
  - Betty Jo Graber
  - Lusia Harris-Stewart
  - John Head
  - Nancy Lieberman
  - Darlene May
  - Ann Meyers-Drysdale
  - Cheryl Miller
  - Billie Moore
  - Shin-Ja Park
  - Harley Redin
  - Uljana Semjonova
  - Jim Smiddy
  - Pat Head Summitt
  - Bertha Teague
  - Margaret Wade
  - Nera White

== Events ==
The Hall of Fame opened in 1999 in Knoxville, Tennessee, USA.

== Deaths ==
- May 8 — John Kotz, 1941 NCAA Tournament Most Outstanding Player and player for the Sheboygan Red Skins (born 1919)
- May 31 — Vic Rouse, American college player, national champion at Loyola-Illinois (1963) (born 1943)
- July 8 — Frank Lubin, member of 1936 US Olympic championship team (born 1910)
- August 7 — John Dee, American college coach (Alabama, Notre Dame) (born 1923)
- August 7 — Harry Litwack, Hall of fame college coach of the Temple Owls (born 1907)
- August 19 — Kim Perrot, WNBA Player for the Houston Comets (born 1967)
- October 4 — Ted Strain, American NBL player and national champion at Wisconsin (1941) (born 1917)
- October 8 — John McLendon, Hall of Fame college and ABA coach (born 1915)
- October 12 — Wilt Chamberlain, player and member of Basketball Hall of Fame. Many believe him to have been the best basketball player in the history of the game (born 1936)
- October 14 — Jim Jordan, All-American at North Carolina (born 1925)
- October 25 — Forddy Anderson, Final Four college coach at both Bradley and Michigan State. NBA scout for the Boston Celtics (born 1919)
- December 1 — William "Pop" Gates, Hall of Fame Harlem Renaissance and Harlem Globetrotters player (born 1917)
- December 23 — Vladimir Kondrashin, FIBA Hall of Fame Russian coach (born 1929)
- December 24 — Reggie Carter, American NBA player (New York Knicks) (born 1957)
- December 31 — Bob McKeen, All-American college player (California) (born 1933)
