= 1999 National Invitation Tournament =

Annual NCAA basketball competition

- Season: 1998–99
- Teams: 32
- Finals site: Madison Square Garden, New York City
- Champions: California Golden Bears (1st title)
- Runner-up: Clemson Tigers (1st title game)
- Semifinalists: Xavier Musketeers (2nd semifinal); Oregon Ducks (2nd semifinal)
- Winning coach: Ben Braun (1st title)
- MVP: Sean Lampley (California)

The 1999 National Invitation Tournament was the 1999 edition of the annual NCAA college basketball competition.

== Selected teams ==
Below is a list of the 32 teams selected for the tournament.

| School | Conference | Record | Appearance | Last bid |
|---|---|---|---|---|
| Alabama | SEC | 17–14 | 8th | 1996 |
| Bradley | Missouri Valley | 17–11 | 19th | 1997 |
| Butler | MCC | 20–9 | 6th | 1992 |
| California | Pac-10 | 17–11 | 4th | 1989 |
| Clemson | ACC | 16–14 | 11th | 1995 |
| Colorado | Big 12 | 17–14 | 5th | 1995 |
| Colorado State | WAC | 17–10 | 6th | 1998 |
| DePaul | C-USA | 17–12 | 13th | 1995 |
| Fresno State | WAC | 21–11 | 7th | 1998 |
| Georgetown | Big East | 15–15 | 7th | 1998 |
| Georgia | SEC | 15–14 | 9th | 1998 |
| Georgia Tech | ACC | 15–15 | 6th | 1998 |
| Hofstra | America East | 22–9 | 1st | Never |
| Kansas State | Big 12 | 20–12 | 5th | 1998 |
| Mississippi State | SEC | 20–12 | 4th | 1994 |
| NC State | ACC | 18–13 | 8th | 1998 |
| Nebraska | Big 12 | 19–12 | 12th | 1997 |
| Northwestern | Big Ten | 15–13 | 3rd | 1994 |
| Old Dominion | Colonial | 24–8 | 9th | 1994 |
| Oregon | Pac-10 | 16–11 | 8th | 1997 |
| Pepperdine | West Coast | 19–12 | 5th | 1993 |
| Princeton | Ivy | 20–7 | 3rd | 1975 |
| Providence | Big East | 16–13 | 15th | 1996 |
| Rutgers | Big East | 18–12 | 10th | 1992 |
| Seton Hall | Big East | 15–14 | 13th | 1998 |
| TCU | WAC | 19–10 | 5th | 1997 |
| Toledo | MAC | 19–8 | 4th | 1981 |
| UNLV | WAC | 16–12 | 5th | 1997 |
| USC | Pac-10 | 15–12 | 4th | 1994 |
| Wake Forest | ACC | 16–13 | 4th | 1998 |
| Wyoming | WAC | 17–9 | 6th | 1998 |
| Xavier | Atlantic 10 | 21–10 | 6th | 1994 |

== Bracket ==
Below are the four first round brackets, along with the four-team championship bracket.

First Round
California | 79
Fresno State | 71
DePaul | 69
Northwestern | 64
Colorado | 65
Pepperdine | 61
Colorado State | 69
Mississippi State | 56

Second Round
California | 58
DePaul | 57
Colorado | 76
Colorado State | 86

Quarterfinals
California | 71
Colorado State | 62

First Round
Oregon | 67
Georgia Tech | 64
Wyoming | 81
USC | 77
Nebraska | 68
UNLV | 53
TCU | 72
Kansas State | 71

Second Round
Oregon | 93
Wyoming | 72
Nebraska | 89
TCU | 101

Quarterfinals
Oregon | 77
TCU | 68

First Round
Butler | 51
Bradley | 50
Old Dominion | 75
Seton Hall | 56
Clemson | 77
Georgia | 57
Rutgers | 58
Hofstra | 45

Second Round
Butler | 75
Old Dominion | 68
Clemson | 78
Rutgers | 68

Quarterfinals
Butler | 69
Clemson | 89

First Round
NC State | 92
Providence | 86
Princeton | 54
Georgetown | 47
Xavier | 86
Toledo | 84
Wake Forest | 73
Alabama | 57

Second Round
NC State | 58
Princeton | 61
Xavier | 87
Wake Forest | 76

Quarterfinals
Princeton | 58
Xavier | 65

=== Semifinals & finals ===
Semifinals
California | 85
Oregon | 69
Clemson | 79
Xavier | 76

Finals
California | 61
Clemson | 60

| Third place game |
| Oregon | 75 |
| Xavier | 106 |

== See also ==
- 1999 Women's National Invitation Tournament
- 1999 NCAA Division I men's basketball tournament
- 1999 NCAA Division II men's basketball tournament
- 1999 NCAA Division III men's basketball tournament
- 1999 NCAA Division I women's basketball tournament
- 1999 NAIA Division I men's basketball tournament
- 1999 NAIA Division II men's basketball tournament
