= 1998–99 Clemson Tigers women's basketball team =

Women's college basketball season

1998–99 Clemson Tigers women's basketball

ACC Tournament Champions

NCAA Tournament, Sweet Sixteen
- Conference: Atlantic Coast Conference

Ranking
- Coaches: No. 13
- AP: No. T-10
- Record: 26–6 (11–5 ACC)
- Head coach: Jim Davis (12th season)
- Home arena: Littlejohn Coliseum

1998–99 ACC women's basketball standings
	Conf.				Overall
Team	W		L	PCT	W		L	PCT
No. 10 т Duke	15	–	1	.938	29	–	7	.806
No. 20 Virginia	12	–	4	.750	20	–	9	.690
No. 10 т Clemson †	11	–	5	.688	26	–	6	.813
No. 14 North Carolina	11	–	5	.688	28	–	8	.778
NC State	9	–	7	.563	17	–	12	.586
Georgia Tech	6	–	10	.375	13	–	14	.481
Wake Forest	3	–	13	.188	8	–	20	.286
Maryland	3	–	13	.188	6	–	21	.222
Florida State	2	–	14	.125	7	–	20	.259
† 1999 ACC tournament winner Rankings from AP poll

The 1998–99 Clemson Tigers women's basketball team represented Clemson University during the 1998–99 NCAA Division I women's basketball season. The Tigers were led by twelfth year head coach Jim Davis. The Tigers, members of the Atlantic Coast Conference, played their home games at Littlejohn Coliseum.

== Schedule ==
Date time, TV	Rank^{#}	Opponent^{#}	Result	Record	Site city, state
November 14, 1998*		UNC Asheville	W 93–26	1–0	Littlejohn Coliseum; Clemson, South Carolina
November 16, 1998*		at Ole Miss	W 76–54	2–0	Tad Smith Coliseum; Oxford, Mississippi
November 18, 1998*		Furman	W 69–43	3–0	Littlejohn Coliseum; Clemson, South Carolina
November 20, 1998*		Wofford	W 101–59	4–0	Littlejohn Coliseum; Clemson, South Carolina
November 30, 1998*	No. 25	at Winthrop	W 65–54	5–0	Winthrop Coliseum; Rock Hill, South Carolina
December 2, 1998	No. 25	No. 17 NC State	W 88–67	6–0 (1–0)	Littlejohn Coliseum; Clemson, South Carolina
December 5, 1998	No. 25	Maryland	W 89–48	7–0 (2–0)	Littlejohn Coliseum; Clemson, South Carolina
December 14, 1998*	No. 14	Dartmouth	W 88–60	8–0 (2–0)	Littlejohn Coliseum; Clemson, South Carolina
December 17, 1998*	No. 14	at South Carolina rivalry	W 84–67	9–0 (2–0)	Carolina Coliseum; Columbia, South Carolina
December 20, 1998*	No. 14	vs. LSU	W 60–58	10–0 (2–0)	Myrtle Beach Convention Center; Myrtle Beach, South Carolina
December 30, 1998*	No. 10	UNC Greensboro	W 59–42	11–0 (2–0)	Littlejohn Coliseum; Clemson, South Carolina
January 2, 1999	No. 10	No. 22 Virginia	L 66–67 ^{OT}	11–1 (2–1)	Littlejohn Coliseum; Clemson, South Carolina
January 4, 1999	No. 12	at No. 6 North Carolina	L 76–87	11–2 (2–2)	Carmichael Arena; Chapel Hill, North Carolina
January 7, 1999	No. 12	Florida State	W 77–55	12–2 (3–2)	Littlejohn Coliseum; Clemson, South Carolina
January 10, 1999	No. 12	at Georgia Tech	W 61–56	13–2 (4–2)	Alexander Memorial Coliseum; Atlanta, Georgia
January 14, 1999	No. 16	at No. 12 Duke	L 77–86	13–3 (4–3)	Cameron Indoor Stadium; Durham, North Carolina
January 17, 1999	No. 16	Wake Forest	W 78–38	14–3 (5–3)	Littlejohn Coliseum; Clemson, South Carolina
January 21, 1999	No. 16	at NC State	W 70–58	15–3 (6–3)	Reynolds Coliseum; Raleigh, North Carolina
January 24, 1999*	No. 16	No. 14 Iowa State	W 81–72	16–3 (6–3)	Littlejohn Coliseum; Clemson, South Carolina
January 28, 1999	No. 15	at Maryland	W 55–45	17–3 (7–3)	Cole Field House; College Park, Maryland
January 31, 1999	No. 15	at No. 19 Virginia	L 55–75	17–4 (7–4)	University Hall; Charlottesville, Virginia
February 3, 1999	No. 17	No. 13 North Carolina	L 72–76	17–5 (7–5)	Littlejohn Coliseum; Clemson, South Carolina
February 7, 1999	No. 17	at Florida State	W 71–67	18–5 (8–5)	Tallahassee–Leon County Civic Center; Tallahassee, Florida
February 11, 1999	No. 19	Georgia Tech	W 69–41	19–5 (9–5)	Littlejohn Coliseum; Clemson, South Carolina
February 14, 1999	No. 19	No. 7 Duke	W 80–75	20–5 (10–5)	Littlejohn Coliseum; Clemson, South Carolina
February 18, 1999	No. 14	at Wake Forest	W 66–38	21–5 (11–5)	LJVM Coliseum; Winston-Salem, North Carolina
ACC Tournament
February 27, 1999*	No. 16	vs. NC State; ACC Tournament quarterfinal	W 52–51	22–5 (11–5)	Independence Arena; Charlotte, North Carolina
February 28, 1999*	No. 16	vs. No. 8 Duke; ACC Tournament semifinal	W 76–71	23–5 (11–5)	Independence Arena; Charlotte, North Carolina
March 1, 1999*	No. 13	vs. No. 11 North Carolina; ACC Tournament final	W 87–72	24–5 (11–5)	Independence Arena; Charlotte, North Carolina
NCAA Tournament
March 12, 1999*	No. 10	Florida A&M; NCAA Tournament first round	W 76–45	25–5 (11–5)	Littlejohn Coliseum; Clemson, South Carolina
March 14, 1999*	No. 10	Illinois; NCAA Tournament second round	W 63–51	26–5 (11–5)	Littlejohn Coliseum; Clemson, South Carolina
March 20, 1999*	No. 10	vs. No. 12 Georgia; NCAA Tournament Mideast Region semifinal	L 54–67	26–6 (11–5)	Shoemaker Center; Cincinnati, Ohio
*Non-conference game. ^{#}Rankings from AP Poll. (#) Tournament seedings in parentheses.
