= 1998–99 Purdue Boilermakers women's basketball team =

Intercollegiate basketball season

1998–99 Purdue Boilermakers women's basketball

NCAA Tournament, National Champions Big Ten regular season champions Big Ten Tournament champions

National Championship Game, W 62–45 vs. Duke
- Conference: Big Ten Conference

Ranking
- Coaches: No. 1
- AP: No. 1
- Record: 34–1 (16–0 B1G)
- Head coach: Carolyn Peck (2nd season)
- Assistant coaches: Pam Stackhouse; Kerry Cremeans; Seth Kushkin
- Captains: Stephanie White; Ukari Figgs
- Home arena: Mackey Arena

1998–99 Big Ten women's basketball standings
	Conf.				Overall
Team	W		L	PCT	W		L	PCT
No. 1 Purdue †	16	–	0	1.000	34	–	1	.971
No. 18 Penn State	12	–	4	.750	22	–	8	.733
Illinois	10	–	6	.625	19	–	12	.613
Ohio State	9	–	7	.563	17	–	12	.586
Wisconsin	9	–	7	.563	18	–	14	.563
Michigan	8	–	8	.500	18	–	12	.600
Michigan State	8	–	8	.500	17	–	14	.548
Iowa	7	–	9	.438	12	–	15	.444
Northwestern	5	–	11	.313	12	–	16	.429
Indiana	2	–	14	.125	13	–	18	.419
Minnesota	2	–	14	.125	7	–	20	.259
† 1999 Big Ten tournament winner Rankings from AP Poll

The 1998–99 Purdue Boilermakers women's basketball team represented Purdue University during the 1998–99 women's college basketball season. Led by 2nd year head coach Carolyn Peck, the team played its home games at Mackey Arena in West Lafayette, Indiana and were members of the Big Ten Conference. Following their sole loss of the season on the road against Stanford on November 22, Purdue embarked on a 32–game win streak to close out the season, culminating with a 62–45 win over Duke in the National Championship game, giving the school its first ever national championship in basketball, and just the second ever NCAA national championship in school history in any team sport.
Coach Peck was named Big Ten Coach of the Year, and was named the AP Coach of the Year in what was her last season with the Boilermakers before leaving the program to become the head coach for the Orlando Miracle of the WNBA.

== Season outlook ==
The team returned all 13 players from the previous years squad that had finished 23–10, won the conference tournament, and made it all the way to the Elite Eight during the 1998 NCAA tournament. Led by senior co-captains Ukari Figgs and Stephanie White, expectations were incredibly high going into the season. White led the team in scoring the year prior with 20.6 points per game, while also leading the team in rebounds (6.1 per game) and assists (4.8 per game). Figgs was second on the team in scoring with 15.5 points per game, while setting what was then the school season records in 3-point field goals made (56) and free throw percentage (85.9%). Also returning was sophomore standout Katie Douglas, who played an important role her freshman year as the third leading scorer on the team with 8.6 points per game, while tying the (then) school record for steals in a season by a freshman, tallying 62 steals. Another key return along with Douglas was fellow sophomore Camille Cooper, whose size at 6'4" made her a handful to deal with in the post. She led the team in blocks (38) as a freshman in addition to averaging 6.6 points per game. With the entire team coming back after having been denied a trip to the Final Four the season prior, motivation was high and the table had been set for a truly special season in West Lafayette.

== Season summary ==
=== Non-conference play ===
The Boilermakers stunned 3-time defending national champion Tennessee in the season opener at home, 78–68, snapping a then 46-game win streak for the Lady Vols. Heading out west, the Boilermakers defeated Arizona before going to Palo Alto to play Stanford, where they suffered their first and only defeat of the season. The Boilermakers trailed for the entire game until Katie Douglas hit a layup with 18 seconds left to tie it up at 72–72, but the Cardinal sank a go-ahead free throw with a second left to upset the newly #1 ranked Boilermakers, 73–72. Returning from their west coast trip, the Boilers ripped off four straight double digit blowout victories over Valparaiso, Northern Illinois, Ball State, and Ohio, before facing #4 Louisiana Tech in a rematch from the 1998 NCAA tournament, where the Lady Techsters had eliminated the Boilermakers in the Elite Eight, 72–65. This time Purdue prevailed, avenging their loss from the tourney by an almost identical score, 71–65. Following this, the ladies closed out their non-conference schedule on the road, defeating #20 Florida in Gainesville, 84–76.

=== Big Ten play ===
The Boilermakers dominated the Big Ten, finishing undefeated in conference play, just the 2nd time in conference history a team had finished undefeated in conference play; Ohio State finished with an 18–0 conference record during the 1984–85 season. Some highlights of conference play include sweeping the season series with in-state rival Indiana, and defeating #15 Penn State in dramatic fashion on the road in overtime to clinch the conference crown. Ukari Figgs and Katie Douglas both scored 21-points in the contest. Douglas hit two clutch shots down the stretch, hitting the game tying shot with 3 seconds left in regulation and then making the game winning layup with 10 seconds left in OT, securing a 76–74 victory. On senior night against Ohio State, the Boilers won 88–58 in front of the first ever sellout crowd for a women's basketball game at Mackey Arena. Purdue finished conference play with two road wins against Minnesota and Northwestern. With the win over Northwestern, Purdue established a new conference record for most consecutive victories with its 23rd straight win. Iowa previously held the record when the Hawkeyes won 22 straight games during the 1987–88 season. No other team threatened the Boilers, as Penn State, who finished 2nd in the conference standings, finished 4 games back.

=== Big Ten tournament ===
The Boilers entered the Big Ten tournament as the top seed, having finished undefeated in conference play. Making light work of Northwestern and Ohio State in the Quarterfinals and Semifinals respectively, the ladies faced Illinois in the tournament championship game. Trailing by 3 with 2:07 left in the game, Stephanie White knocked down a 3-pointer to tie the game at 74–74, after which the Boilermakers pulled away at the free throw line, securing an 80–76 victory in a tightly contested battle for the conference tournament title, and winning the conference tournament for a second consecutive season. White finished the game with 33-points and was named tournament MVP, while Ukari Figgs and Katie Douglas joined her on the All-Tournament team.

=== NCAA tournament ===
As conference tournament champions, Purdue was given an automatic bid to the NCAA tournament, where the Boilers were placed as the number 1 seed in the Midwest region. In the first round, Purdue was victorious over 16th seeded Oral Roberts, winning 68–48. They then defeated 9th seeded Kansas in the second round, 55–41, advancing to the 2nd weekend of the tournament in the process. Leaving the confines of Mackey Arena, they eliminated 4th seeded North Carolina in the Sweet Sixteen, winning 82–59. Finally, the ladies defeated 3rd seeded Rutgers in the Elite Eight, 75–62, advancing to the Final Four for just the second time in school history.

In the national semifinal, they faced a familiar tournament foe in Louisiana Tech, who were the 1 seed out of the West region. Purdue advanced, defeating the Lady Techsters 77–63, their season ending the same way they had ended the Boilermakers season the year prior. They then faced Duke in the National Championship game. Duke were being coached by former Purdue staff member, Gail Goestenkors; Goestenkors had been an assistant coach at Purdue under former Boiler head coach Lin Dunn from 1986 to 1992. Additionally, two players from Duke, Nicole Erickson and Michele Van Gorp, had previously played at Purdue prior to transferring. Purdue emerged victorious, 62–45, securing the school's first ever national championship in basketball. It was also the first NCAA national title by a women's basketball team from the Big Ten.

== Roster ==
1998–99 Purdue Boilermakers women's basketball team
Players
Coaches

Pos.	#	Name	Height	Year	Previous school	Hometown
G	15	Danielle Bird	5 ft 7 in (1.7 m)	Jr	Bishop Dwenger	Fort Wayne, Indiana
C	42	Camille Cooper	6 ft 4 in (1.93 m)	So	Scott County	Georgetown, Kentucky
F	31	Candi Crawford	6 ft 1 in (1.85 m)	So	Homestead	Fort Wayne, Indiana
F	25	Mackenzie Curless	6 ft 1 in (1.85 m)	Jr	Martinsville	Martinsville, Indiana
G/F	32	Katie Douglas	6 ft 1 in (1.85 m)	So	Perry Meridian	Indianapolis, Indiana
F	33	Michelle Duhart	6 ft 0 in (1.83 m)	Jr	Wakefield	Arlington, Virginia
G	5	Ukari Figgs (C)	5 ft 9 in (1.75 m)	Sr	Scott County	Georgetown, Kentucky
G	3	Kelly Komara	5 ft 7 in (1.7 m)	Fr	Lake Central	Schererville, Indiana
G/F	41	Mo-Nique Langston	5 ft 11 in (1.8 m)	So	Bakersfield North	Bakersfield, California
F	24	Beth Lapaich	6 ft 0 in (1.83 m)	So	LaPorte (H.S.); Butler	LaPorte, Indiana
F	40	Connie Murdock	6 ft 2 in (1.88 m)	So	Clay	South Bend, Indiana
C	55	Mary Jo Noon (redshirt)	6 ft 5 in (1.96 m)	Fr	Jeffersonville	Clarksville, Indiana
G	21	Shayla Potter	5 ft 6 in (1.68 m)	Jr	Westchester	Inglewood, California
F	52	Amy Schaffer	6 ft 0 in (1.83 m)	Sr	Hillsdale	Hillsdale, Michigan
G/F	22	Stephanie White (C)	5 ft 11 in (1.8 m)	Sr	Seeger Memorial	West Lebanon, Indiana
G	23	Tiffany Young	5 ft 11 in (1.8 m)	Jr	East Lawrence H.S.	Hillsboro, Alabama

Head coach

- Carolyn Peck (Vanderbilt)

Assistant coach(es)

- Pam Stackhouse (Louisiana Tech)
- Kerry Cremeans (Florida)
- Seth Kushkin (Wisconsin)

Legend

- (C) Team captain
- (S) Suspended
- (I) Ineligible
- (W) Walk-on
- Injured
- Current redshirt

== Schedule and results ==
Date time, TV	Rank^{#}	Opponent^{#}	Result	Record	High points	High rebounds	High assists	Site city, state
Non–Conference Regular Season
November 15, 1998*; 4:30 pm, ESPN	No. 5	No. 1 Tennessee; State Farm Tip–Off Classic	W 78–68	1–0	22 – White	11 – Duhart	4 – Tied	Mackey Arena (11,788); West Lafayette, Indiana
November 19, 1998*	No. 1	at Arizona	W 65–58	2–0	23 – White	10 – Duhart	5 – Figgs	McKale Center (3,076); Tucson, Arizona
November 22, 1998*	No. 1	at Stanford	L 72–73	2–1	24 – White	7 – Douglas	6 – White	Maples Pavilion (4,553); Palo Alto, California
November 25, 1998*	No. 4	Valparaiso	W 92–51	3–1	20 – Figgs	6 – Douglas	11 – Figgs	Mackey Arena (7,920); West Lafayette, Indiana
December 4, 1998*	No. 4	Northern Illinois	W 83–55	4–1	21 – Figgs	9 – White	8 – Douglas	Mackey Arena (8,048); West Lafayette, Indiana
December 6, 1998*	No. 4	vs. Ball State; Big 4 Classic	W 103–58	5–1	19 – White	8 – White	11 – Figgs	Hulman Center (3,239); Terre Haute, Indiana
December 12, 1998*	No. 3	at Ohio	W 92–52	6–1	17 – Tied	8 – Tied	6 – Douglas	Convocation Center (1,952); Athens, Ohio
December 19, 1998*	No. 3	vs. No. 4 Louisiana Tech; Boilermaker Blockbuster	W 71–65	7–1	25 – White	9 – Duhart	4 – Figgs	Market Square Arena (13,547); Indianapolis, Indiana
December 21, 1998*	No. 3	at No. 20 Florida	W 84–76	8–1	33 – White	6 – Figgs	5 – Tied	O'Connell Center (3,188); Gainesville, Florida
Big Ten Regular Season
December 30, 1998	No. 3	Minnesota	W 73–52	9–1 (1–0)	15 – Figgs	7 – Tied	5 – Douglas	Mackey Arena (9,330); West Lafayette, Indiana
January 5, 1999	No. 3	No. 17 Penn State	W 53–48	10–1 (2–0)	19 – White	7 – Cooper	4 – Figgs	Mackey Arena (7,347); West Lafayette, Indiana
January 10, 1999	No. 3	at Iowa	W 71–69 ^{OT}	11–1 (3–0)	16 – White	8 – Tied	5 – Douglas	Carver–Hawkeye Arena (4,761); Iowa City, Iowa
January 12, 1999	No. 3	Northwestern	W 76–46	12–1 (4–0)	20 – White	7 – White	4 – White	Mackey Arena (7,466); West Lafayette, Indiana
January 15, 1999	No. 3	Michigan State	W 70–47	13–1 (5–0)	23 – White	6 – Tied	7 – White	Mackey Arena (3,519); West Lafayette, Indiana
January 18, 1999	No. 3	at Illinois	W 71–60	14–1 (6–0)	20 – Tied	7 – Duhart	5 – Tied	Assembly Hall (10,092); Champaign, Illinois
January 22, 1999	No. 3	Indiana; Rivalry Game	W 97–62	15–1 (7–0)	22 – White	11 – White	10 – White	Mackey Arena (10,039); West Lafayette, Indiana
January 24, 1999	No. 3	Wisconsin	W 76–56	16–1 (8–0)	19 – Douglas	9 – White	7 – White	Mackey Arena (9,960); West Lafayette, Indiana
January 26, 1999	No. 2	at No. 19 Ohio State	W 64–56	17–1 (9–0)	20 – White	9 – Duhart	5 – White	Value City Arena (8,877); Columbus, Ohio
January 29, 1999	No. 2	at Indiana; Rivalry Game	W 91–86	18–1 (10–0)	28 – White	6 – Duhart	6 – White	Simon Skjodt Assembly Hall (5,503); Bloomington, Indiana
January 31, 1999	No. 2	at Michigan State	W 80–66	19–1 (11–0)	27 – Figgs	7 – Tied	4 – Tied	Breslin Center (3,519); East Lansing, Michigan
February 4, 1999*	No. 2	at Providence	W 96–67	20–1	24 – White	9 – Douglas	6 – White	Providence Civic Center (321); Providence, Rhode Island
February 7, 1999	No. 2	Michigan	W 70–64	21–1 (12–0)	17 – White	14 – Duhart	3 – Tied	Mackey Arena (12,932); West Lafayette, Indiana
February 12, 1999; 8:00 pm, FSN Chicago	No. 2	at No. 15 Penn State	W 76–74 ^{OT}	22–1 (13–0)	21 – Figgs	9 – Duhart	4 – Figgs	Bryce Jordan Center (7,151); State College, Pennsylvania
February 14, 1999	No. 2	Ohio State	W 88–58	23–1 (14–0)	19 – Cooper	13 – Cooper	6 – White	Mackey Arena (14,123); West Lafayette, Indiana
February 19, 1999	No. 2	at Minnesota	W 63–61	24–1 (15–0)	20 – White	8 – Figgs	7 – White	Williams Arena (4,902); Minneapolis, Minnesota
February 21, 1999; 3:00 pm, FSN Chicago	No. 2	at Northwestern	W 71–62	25–1 (16–0)	21 – Figgs	9 – Douglas	7 – White	Welsh–Ryan Arena (2,479); Evanston, Illinois
Big Ten Tournament
February 27, 1999*; 12:00 pm, FSN Chicago	(1) No. 1	vs. (9) Northwestern; Quarterfinals	W 79–56	26–1	24 – White	8 – Tied	6 – Tied	RCA Dome (7,317); Indianapolis, Indiana
February 28, 1999*; 1:00 pm, FSN Chicago	(1) No. 1	vs. (4) Ohio State; Semifinals	W 72–59	27–1	21 – Figgs	7 – Duhart	5 – Figgs	RCA Dome (6,123); Indianapolis, Indiana
March 1, 1999*; 7:30 pm, ESPN2	(1) No. 1	vs. (3) Illinois; Championship Game	W 80–76	28–1	31 – White	11 – Douglas	6 – Figgs	RCA Dome (6,459); Indianapolis, Indiana
NCAA Tournament
March 13, 1999*; 8:30 pm, ESPN2	(1 MW) No. 1	vs. (16 MW) Oral Roberts; First Round	W 68–48	29–1	19 – Cooper	8 – White	6 – White	Mackey Arena (9,169); West Lafayette, Indiana
March 15, 1999*; 7:30 pm, ESPN2	(1 MW) No. 1	vs. (8 MW) Kansas; Second Round	W 55–41	30–1	15 – Douglas	9 – Douglas	3 – Douglas	Mackey Arena (9,501); West Lafayette, Indiana
March 20, 1999*; 8:00 pm, ESPN	(1 MW) No. 1	vs. (4 MW) No. 14 North Carolina; Sweet Sixteen	W 82–59	31–1	24 – Figgs	7 – Figgs	8 – Douglas	Redbird Arena (9,041); Normal, Illinois
March 22, 1999*; 7:00 pm, ESPN	(1 MW) No. 1	vs. (2 MW) No. 9 Rutgers; Elite Eight	W 75–62	32–1	22 – White	6 – Douglas	4 – Tied	Redbird Arena (8,844); Normal, Illinois
March 26, 1999*; 9:30 pm, ESPN	(1 MW) No. 1	vs. (1 W) No. 3 Louisiana Tech; Final Four	W 77–63	33–1	24 – Figgs	10 – Figgs	4 – Tied	San Jose Arena (17,773); San Jose, California
March 28, 1999*; 9:00 pm, ESPN	(1 MW) No. 1	vs. (3 E) No. 10 Duke; National Championship Game	W 62–45	34–1	18 – Figgs	9 – Cooper	2 – Tied	San Jose Arena (17,773); San Jose, California
*Non-conference game. ^{#}Rankings from AP Poll. (#) Tournament seedings in parentheses. All times are in Eastern Time. MW = Mid-West, W = West, E = East.

== Player statistics ==
Individual player statistics (Final)
			Minutes		Scoring		Total FGs			3-point FGs			Free-Throws			Rebounds							
Player	GP	GS	Tot	Avg	Pts	Avg	FG	FGA	Pct	3FG	3FA	Pct	FT	FTA	Pct	Off	Def	Tot	Avg	A	Stl	Blk	TO
Bird, Danielle	12	0	40	3.3	3	0.2	1	6	.167	1	2	.500	0	4	.000	2	0	2	0.2	3	1	0	2
Cooper, Camille	35	34	792	22.6	341	9.7	149	232	.642	0	0	.000	43	86	.500	72	99	171	4.9	5	16	54	60
Crawford, Candi	31	0	247	8.0	59	1.9	19	38	.500	0	0	.000	21	41	.512	19	23	42	1.4	1	5	0	11
Curless, Mackenzie	29	1	245	8.4	78	2.7	30	63	.476	0	0	.000	18	25	.720	17	17	34	1.2	4	5	1	15
Douglas, Katie	35	35	1178	33.7	493	14.1	175	376	.465	22	63	.349	121	148	.818	63	154	217	6.2	124	91	17	101
Duhart, Michelle	35	35	1047	29.9	130	3.7	53	92	.576	0	0	.000	24	46	.522	94	105	199	5.7	25	56	6	53
Figgs, Ukari	35	35	1235	35.3	570	16.3	175	441	.397	69	202	.342	151	175	.863	37	121	158	4.5	147	58	8	84
Komara, Kelly	35	0	612	17.5	187	5.3	58	144	.403	26	63	.413	45	66	.682	21	68	89	2.5	66	40	5	42
Langston, Mo-Nique	9	0	21	2.3	13	1.4	5	9	.556	1	2	.500	2	2	1.000	2	2	4	0.4	1	3	0	5
Lapaich, Beth	4	0	4	1.0	0	0.0	0	1	.000	0	0	.000	0	0	.000	0	0	0	0.0	1	0	0	1
Murdock, Connie	17	0	75	4.4	21	1.2	7	15	.467	0	0	.000	7	12	.583	8	8	16	0.9	3	5	4	7
Potter, Shayla	1	0	1	1.0	0	0.0	0	1	.000	0	0	.000	0	0	.000	0	1	1	0.1	0	0	0	1
Schaffer, Amy	10	0	28	2.8	6	0.6	2	8	.250	0	0	.000	2	3	.667	1	0	1	0.1	0	0	0	2
White, Stephanie	35	35	1258	35.9	707	20.2	254	524	.468	62	142	.437	155	195	.795	68	120	188	5.4	156	78	17	116
Young, Tiffany	33	0	267	8.1	68	2.1	25	78	.321	5	22	.227	13	25	.520	10	27	37	1.1	11	11	1	13
TEAM																56	82	138	4.1				5
Total	35		7050		2676	76.5	944	2028	.465	186	496	.375	602	828	.727	470	827	1297	37.1	547	369	113	518
Opponents	35		7050		2099	60.0	817	1967	.415	143	433	.330	322	509	.633	419	750	1169	33.4	466	231	99	677

Legend
GP	Games played	GS	Games started	Avg	Average per game
FG	Field-goals made	FGA	Field-goal attempts	Off	Offensive rebounds
Def	Defensive rebounds	A	Assists	TO	Turnovers
Blk	Blocks	Stl	Steals

== Rankings ==
Ranking movements Legend: ██ Increase in ranking ██ Decrease in ranking
	Week																	
Poll	Pre	1	2	3	4	5	6	7	8	9	10	11	12	13	14	15	16	Final
AP	5	1	4	4	3	3	3	3	3	3	3	2	2	2	2	1	1	1

== Awards and honors ==
=== In-season awards ===
Name	Award	Date
Katie Douglas	Big Ten Player of the Week	February 14, 1999
Stephanie White	Big Ten Player of the Week	November 15, 1998
Stephanie White	Big Ten Player of the Week	December 27, 1998
Stephanie White	Big Ten Player of the Week	January 17, 1999
Stephanie White	Big Ten Player of the Week	January 31, 1999

=== Post-season awards ===
==== Camille Cooper ====
- All–Big Ten Honorable Mention (media)
- NCAA Tournament All–Mid-West Regional Team

==== Katie Douglas ====
- All–Big Ten Second Team (coaches and media)
- NCAA Final Four All–Tournament Team

==== Michelle Duhart ====
- All–Big Ten Honorable Mention (media)

==== Ukari Figgs ====
- All–Big Ten First Team (coaches and media)
- AP Honorable Mention All-American
- NCAA Tournament All–Mid-West Regional Team
- NCAA Tournament Most Outstanding Player

==== Kelly Komara ====
- All–Big Ten Freshman Team

==== Stephanie White ====
- Big Ten Player of the Year (coaches and media)
- All–Big Ten First Team (coaches and media)
- Consensus All–American First Team
- Wade Trophy Recipient
- Naismith Award Finalist
- NCAA Tournament Mid-West Regional Most Outstanding Player
- NCAA Final Four All–Tournament Team
