= 2015 WNBA Finals =

Championship series for the 2015 WNBA season

Team	Coach	Wins
Minnesota Lynx	Cheryl Reeve	3
Indiana Fever	Stephanie White	2
- Dates: October 4–14
- MVP: (United States) Sylvia Fowles (Minnesota)
- Hall of Famers: Lynx: Sylvia Fowles (2025); Maya Moore (2025); Seimone Augustus (2024); Lindsay Whalen (2022); Fever: Tamika Catchings (2020)
- Eastern finals: Indiana Fever defeated New York, 2–1
- Western finals: Minnesota Lynx defeated Phoenix, 2–0

The 2015 WNBA Finals was the championship series for the 2015 WNBA season of the Women's National Basketball Association (WNBA).

The WNBA Finals were under a 2–2–1 rotation. The Lynx held home-court advantage as they had a better regular season record (22–12) than the Fever (20–14).

== 2015 WNBA regular season ==
Eastern Conference	W	L	PCT	GB	Home	Road	Conf.
x - New York Liberty	23	11	.676	–	12–5	11–6	13–9
x - Chicago Sky	21	13	.618	2	13–4	8–9	14–8
x - Indiana Fever	20	14	.588	3	11–6	9–8	13–9
x - Washington Mystics	18	16	.529	5	11–6	7–10	10–12
e - Atlanta Dream	15	19	.441	8	9–8	6–11	10–12
e - Connecticut Sun	15	19	.441	8	8–9	7–10	6–16

Western Conference	W	L	PCT	GB	Home	Road	Conf.
z - Minnesota Lynx	22	12	.647	–	13–4	9–8	16–6
x - Phoenix Mercury	20	14	.588	2	13–4	7–10	15–7
x - Tulsa Shock	18	16	.529	4	12–5	6–11	11–11
x - Los Angeles Sparks	14	20	.412	8	9–8	5–12	10–12
e - Seattle Storm	10	24	.294	12	8–9	2–15	8–14
e - San Antonio Stars	8	26	.235	14	7–10	1–16	6–16

== 2015 WNBA playoffs ==
Minnesota Lynx		Indiana Fever
22–12 (.647); 1st West, 2nd overall	Seeding	20–14 (.588); 3rd East, 4th overall
Defeated the (4) Los Angeles Sparks, 2–1	Conference Semifinals	Defeated the (2) Chicago Sky, 2–1
Defeated the (2) Phoenix Mercury, 2–0	Conference Finals	Defeated the (1) New York Liberty, 2–1

=== Indiana Fever ===
The Indiana Fever finished 20–14, good for third place in the Eastern Conference. The Fever lost their first playoff game against the Chicago Sky, but rallied to win two straight elimination games, setting up a conference final against the New York Liberty. Once again, Indiana lost the first game of the series, but rallied to win two straight to reach the finals for the third time in franchise history, which gave Stephanie White the first rookie head coach to lead her team to the WNBA Finals.

=== Minnesota Lynx ===
The Minnesota Lynx finished with the best record in the Western Conference for the fourth time in five year, finishing with a 22–12 record. With the mid-season addition of Sylvia Fowles from the Chicago Sky, the Lynx eliminated the Los Angeles Sparks in three games. The Lynx then swept the Phoenix Mercury in the Western Conference Finals after a controversial foul called on Mercury guard Noelle Quinn on Maya Moore with 1.5 seconds left in the fourth quarter in Game 2, which gave them a chance to win their third WNBA title in five years.

=== Regular-season series ===
The Minnesota Lynx won the season series 2–0:

June 6, 2015

Report

Minnesota Lynx 78, Indiana Fever 69

Bankers Life Fieldhouse, Indianapolis, IN

September 4, 2015

Report

Indiana Fever 65, Minnesota Lynx 81

Target Center, Minneapolis, MN

== Series summary ==
All times are in Eastern Daylight Time (UTC−4).

=== Game 1 ===
ABC

October 4
3:00pm ET

Game 1

Indiana Fever 75, Minnesota Lynx 69
Scoring by quarter: 10–10, 25–19, 19–18, 21–22
Pts: January 19; Rebs: Larkins 8 Asts: January 6	Pts: Moore 27; Rebs: Moore 12; Asts: Augustus, Whalen 4
Indiana leads series, 1-0

Target Center, Minneapolis, MN
Attendance: 11,023
Referees: Sue Blauch, Eric Brewton, Kurt Walker

=== Game 2 ===
ESPN2

October 6
8:00pm ET

Game 2

Indiana Fever 71, Minnesota Lynx 77
Scoring by quarter: 24–20, 17–19, 18–24, 12–14
Pts: January 17; Rebs: Catchings, Larkins 9 Asts: Catchings, January 5	Pts: Fowles 21; Rebs: Fowles 9 Asts: Cruz, Moore 5
Series tied, 1-1

Target Center, Minneapolis, MN
Attendance: 12,134
Referees: Michael Price, Maj Forsberg, Lamont Simpson

=== Game 3 ===
ESPN2

October 9
8:00pm ET

Game 3

Minnesota Lynx 80, Indiana Fever 77
Scoring by quarter: 20–19, 18–23, 21–15, 21–20
Pts: Moore 24; Rebs: Fowles 11; Asts: Cruz 5	Pts: Johnson 17; Rebs: Catchings 10; Asts: January 8
Minnesota leads series, 2-1

Bankers Life Fieldhouse, Indianapolis, IN
Attendance: 16,332
Referees: Denise Brooks, Roy Gulbeyan, Tom Mauer

=== Game 4 ===
ESPN

October 11
8:30pm ET

Game 4

Minnesota Lynx 69, Indiana Fever 75
Scoring by quarter: 20–15, 12–21, 14–22, 23–17
Pts: Moore 20; Rebs: Moore 8 Asts: six tied 2	Pts: Johnson 15; Rebs: Larkins 6 Asts: January 5
Series tied, 2-2

Bankers Life Fieldhouse, Indianapolis, IN
Attendance: 10,582
Referees: Sue Blauch, Eric Brewton, Maj Forsberg

=== Game 5 ===
ESPN2

October 14
8:00pm ET

Game 5

Indiana Fever 52, Minnesota Lynx 69
Scoring by quarter: 17–15, 4–12, 8–21, 23–21
Pts: Catchings 18; Rebs: Catchings 11; Asts: January, Zellous 3	Pts: Fowles 20; Rebs: Brunson 14; Asts: Moore 5
Minnesota wins WNBA Finals, 3-2

Target Center, Minneapolis, MN
Attendance: 18,933
Referees: Michael Price, Denise Brooks, Roy Gulbeyan

== Rosters ==
2015 Minnesota Lynx roster
Players
Coaches

Pos.	No.	Nat.	Name	Height	Weight	DOB	From	Yrs
G/F	33	(United States)	Augustus, Seimone	6' 0" (1.83m)	165 lb (75kg)	1984-04-30	LSU	9
F	32	(United States)	Brunson, Rebekkah	6' 2" (1.88m)	185 lb (84kg)	1981-12-11	Georgetown	11
G	51	(Spain)	Cruz, Anna	5' 9" (1.75m)	155 lb (70kg)	1986-10-27	Spain	1
C	34	(United States)	Fowles, Sylvia	6' 6" (1.98m)	208 lb (94kg)	1985-10-06	LSU	7
G	3	(United States)	Greene, Kalana	5' 10" (1.78m)	155 lb (70kg)	1987-07-13	Connecticut	5
F	15	(United States)	Jones, Asjha	6' 2" (1.88m)	187 lb (85kg)	1980-08-01	Connecticut	11
F	1	(United States)	Kelley, Shae	6' 1" (1.85m)	166 lb (75kg)	1991-09-29	Minnesota	R
G	20	(United States)	Liston, Tricia	6' 0" (1.83m)	185 lb (84kg)	1992-02-20	Duke	1
G	21	(United States)	Montgomery, Renee	5' 7" (1.7m)	143 lb (65kg)	1986-12-02	Connecticut	6
F	23	(United States)	Moore, Maya	6' 0" (1.83m)	177 lb (80kg)	1989-06-11	Connecticut	4
F	14	(United States)	Peters, Devereaux	6' 2" (1.88m)	174 lb (79kg)	1989-10-08	Notre Dame	3
G	13	(United States)	Whalen, Lindsay	5' 9" (1.75m)	164 lb (74kg)	1982-05-09	Minnesota	11

Head coach
(United States) Cheryl Reeve (La Salle)
Assistant coaches
(United States) Shelley Patterson (Washington State)
(United States) Jim Petersen (Minnesota)
Athletic trainer
(United States) Chuck Barta (UW–La Crosse)
Assistant trainer
(United States) Keith Uzpen (Minnesota State)

Legend

- (C) Team captain
- (DP) Unsigned draft pick
- (FA) Free agent
- (S) Suspended
- Injured

2015 Indiana Fever roster
Players
Coaches

Pos.	No.	Nat.	Name	Height	Weight	DOB	From	Yrs
F	11	(Canada)	Achonwa, Natalie	6' 4" (1.93m)	183 lb (83kg)	1992-11-22	Notre Dame	R
F	24	(United States)	Catchings, Tamika	6' 1" (1.85m)	167 lb (76kg)	1979-07-21	Tennessee	13
G	5	(United States)	Clarendon, Layshia	5' 9" (1.75m)	140 lb (64kg)	1991-05-02	California	2
G/F	25	(United States)	Coleman, Marissa	6' 1" (1.85m)	160 lb (73kg)	1987-01-04	Maryland	6
F	33	(United States)	Howard, Natasha	6' 3" (1.91m)	169 lb (77kg)	1991-09-02	Florida State	1
G	20	(United States)	January, Briann	5' 8" (1.73m)	144 lb (65kg)	1987-01-11	Arizona State	6
G	42	(United States)	Johnson, Shenise	5' 11" (1.8m)	172 lb (78kg)	1990-12-09	Miami (FL)	3
F	12	(United States)	Kizer, Lynetta	6' 4" (1.93m)	230 lb (104kg)	1990-04-04	Maryland	3
F	2	(United States)	Larkins, Erlana	6' 1" (1.85m)	205 lb (93kg)	1986-04-02	North Carolina	5
G	8	(United States)	Lucas, Maggie	5' 10" (1.78m)	152 lb (69kg)	1991-11-29	Penn State	1
G	32	(United States)	Pohlen, Jeanette	6' 0" (1.83m)	171 lb (78kg)	1989-05-02	Stanford	3
G	1	(United States)	Zellous, Shavonte	5' 10" (1.78m)	155 lb (70kg)	1986-08-28	Pittsburgh	6

Head coach
(United States) Stephanie White (Purdue)
Assistant coaches
(United States) Gail Goestenkors (Saginaw Valley State)
(United States) Gary Kloppenburg (UC San Diego)
Athletic trainer
(United States) Todd Champlin (Daemen)
Strength and conditioning coach
(United States) Emily Burgess (Slippery Rock)

Legend

- (C) Team captain
- (DP) Unsigned draft pick
- (FA) Free agent
- (S) Suspended
- Injured
