= 1998–99 Louisiana Tech Lady Techsters basketball team =

1998-99 Louisiana Tech women's basketball season

1998–99 Louisiana Tech Lady Techsters basketball

Sun Belt regular season champion Sun Belt tournament champion

NCAA tournament, Final Four
- Conference: Sun Belt Conference

Ranking
- Coaches: No. 3
- AP: No. 3
- Record: 30–3 (12–0 Sun Belt Conference)
- Head coach: Leon Barmore (17th season)
- Assistant coach: Kim Mulkey
- Home arena: Thomas Assembly Center

1998–99 Sun Belt Conference women's basketball standings
	Conf.				Overall
Team	W		L	PCT	W		L	PCT
No. 3 Louisiana Tech †	12	–	0	1.000	30	–	3	.909
No. 24 Florida International	9	–	3	.750	23	–	7	.767
Western Kentucky	8	–	4	.667	21	–	7	.750
Arkansas State	7	–	5	.583	18	–	14	.563
New Orleans	4	–	8	.333	11	–	16	.407
South Alabama	2	–	10	.167	7	–	19	.269
Louisiana–Lafayette	0	–	12	.000	1	–	26	.037
† 1999 Sun Belt tournament winner

The 1998–99 Louisiana Tech Lady Techsters basketball team represented Louisiana Tech University during the 1998–99 NCAA Division I women's basketball season. The team was led by head coach Leon Barmore, who guided the team to a 30–3 record and an appearance in the 1999 NCAA tournament. The team reached one last Final Four appearance during Barmore's stellar career. This was the program's tenth appearance in the Final Four. The team played their home games at the Thomas Assembly Center in Ruston, Louisiana as a member of the Sun Belt Conference.

== Roster ==
1998–99 Louisiana Tech Lady Techsters women's basketball team
Players
Coaches

Pos.	#	Name	Height	Year	Hometown
G		LaQuan Stallworth	5 ft 7 in (1.7 m)	Sr	Silsbee, Texas
F	12	Ayana Walker	6 ft 3 in (1.91 m)	Fr	Houston, Texas
F	21	Monica Maxwell	5 ft 9 in (1.75 m)	Sr	East Chicago, Indiana
G	25	Betty Lennox	5 ft 8 in (1.73 m)	Jr	Grant, Oklahoma
F	30	Amanda Wilson	6 ft 0 in (1.83 m)	Sr
G	35	Tamicha Jackson	5 ft 5 in (1.65 m)	Jr	Dallas, Texas

Head coach

- Leon Barmore

Assistant coach(es)

- Kim Mulkey

Legend

- (C) Team captain
- (S) Suspended
- (I) Ineligible
- (W) Walk-on
- Injured
- Current redshirt

== Schedule and results ==
Date time, TV	Rank^{#}	Opponent^{#}	Result	Record	Site (attendance) city, state
Regular season
Jan 30, 1999	No. 3	New Orleans	W 110–50	17–2 (5–0)	Thomas Assembly Center; Ruston, Louisiana
Feb 6, 1999	No. 3	South Alabama	W 96–32	18–2 (6–0)	Thomas Assembly Center; Ruston, Louisiana
Feb 9, 1999	No. 3	at No. 24 Florida International	W 80–65	19–2 (7–0)	Golden Panther Arena; Miami, FL
Feb 14, 1999	No. 3	at Arkansas State	W 79–63	20–2 (8–0)	Convocation Center; Jonesboro, Arkansas
Feb 18, 1999	No. 3	Louisiana–Lafayette	W 92–51	21–2 (9–0)	Thomas Assembly Center; Ruston, Louisiana
Feb 20, 1999	No. 3	Western Kentucky	W 97–70	22–2 (10–0)	Thomas Assembly Center; Ruston, Louisiana
Feb 25, 1999	No. 3	at South Alabama	W 98–39	23–2 (11–0)	Mitchell Center; Mobile, Alabama
Feb 27, 1999	No. 3	at New Orleans	W 97–57	24–2 (12–0)	Lakefront Arena; New Orleans, Louisiana
Sun Belt tournament
Mar 5, 1999*	(1) No. 3	at (4) Arkansas State; Semifinals	W 114–67	25–2	Convocation Center; Jonesboro, AR
Mar 6, 1999*	(1) No. 3	vs. (2) No. 23 Florida International; Championship game	W 94–70	26–2	Convocation Center; Jonesboro, AR
NCAA tournament
Mar 13, 1999*	(1 W) No. 3	vs. (16 W) UCF; First round	W 90–48	27–2	Thomas Assembly Center (6,038); Ruston, LA
Mar 15, 1999*	(1 W) No. 3	vs. (8 W) Penn State; Second round	W 79–62	28–2	Thomas Assembly Center (6,847); Ruston, LA
Mar 20, 1999*	(1 W) No. 3	vs. (4 W) No. 21 LSU; Regional Semifinal – Sweet Sixteen	W 73–52	29–2	L.A. Sports Arena (4,583); Los Angeles, CA
Mar 22, 1999*	(1 W) No. 3	vs. (3 W) No. 15 UCLA; Regional Final – Elite Eight	W 88–62	30–2	L.A. Sports Arena (5,302); Los Angeles, CA
Mar 26, 1999	(1 W) No. 3	vs. (1 MW) No. 1 Purdue; National Semifinal – Final Four	L 63–77	30–3	San Jose Arena (17,773); San Jose, California
*Non-conference game. ^{#}Rankings from AP Poll. (#) Tournament seedings in parentheses. W=West. All times are in Central.

== Rankings ==
Ranking movements Legend: ██ Increase in ranking ██ Decrease in ranking
	Week																		
Poll	Pre	1	2	3	4	5	6	7	8	9	10	11	12	13	14	15	16	17	Final
AP	2	3	2	2	4	4	5	5	5	5	4	3	3	3	3	3	3	3	Not released
Coaches																			3

^Coaches did not release a Week 2 poll.
