= 1998–99 Duke Blue Devils women's basketball team =

Intercollegiate basketball season

1998–99 Duke Blue Devils women's basketball

ACC regular season champions

NCAA tournament, Runner-up
- Conference: Atlantic Coast Conference

Ranking
- Coaches: No. 2
- AP: No. 10
- Record: 29–7 (15–1 ACC)
- Head coach: Gail Goestenkors (7th season)
- Home arena: Cameron Indoor Stadium

1998–99 ACC women's basketball standings
	Conf.				Overall
Team	W		L	PCT	W		L	PCT
No. 10 т Duke	15	–	1	.938	29	–	7	.806
No. 20 Virginia	12	–	4	.750	20	–	9	.690
No. 10 т Clemson †	11	–	5	.688	26	–	6	.813
No. 14 North Carolina	11	–	5	.688	28	–	8	.778
NC State	9	–	7	.563	17	–	12	.586
Georgia Tech	6	–	10	.375	13	–	14	.481
Wake Forest	3	–	13	.188	8	–	20	.286
Maryland	3	–	13	.188	6	–	21	.222
Florida State	2	–	14	.125	7	–	20	.259
† 1999 ACC tournament winner Rankings from AP poll

The 1998–99 Duke Blue Devils women's basketball team represented Duke University during the 1998–99 NCAA Division I women's basketball season. Returning as head coach was Gail Goestenkors for her 7th season at the school. The team played its home games at Cameron Indoor Stadium in Durham, North Carolina as members of the Atlantic Coast Conference. They finished the season 29–7, 15–1 in ACC play to finish as regular season conference champions. They were defeated in the ACC tournament but received an at-large bid to the NCAA tournament. Playing as No. 3 seed in the East region, the Blue Devils reached the first Final Four in program history. They advanced to the National championship game where they were beaten by No. 1 overall seed Purdue.

== Roster ==
1998–99 Duke Blue Devils women's basketball team
Players
Coaches

Pos.	#	Name	Height	Year	Previous school	Hometown
G	22	Nicole Erikson	5 ft 6 in (1.68 m)	RS Sr	Purdue	Fullerton, CA
G	23	Georgia Schweitzer	6 ft 0 in (1.83 m)	So	Bishop Hartley	Pataskala, OH
C	31	Michele Van Gorp	6 ft 6 in (1.98 m)	RS Sr	Purdue

Head coach

- Gail Goestenkors (Saginaw Valley State)

Assistant coach(es)

Legend

- (C) Team captain
- (S) Suspended
- (I) Ineligible
- (W) Walk-on
- Injured
- Current redshirt

Roster

== Schedule ==
Date time, TV	Rank^{#}	Opponent^{#}	Result	Record	Site (attendance) city, state
Regular season
Nov 13, 1998*	No. 4	vs. No. 3 UConn; Nike Four in the Fall	L 74–104	0–1	San Jose Arena; San Jose, California
Nov 14, 1998*	No. 4	vs. No. 19 Stanford; Nike Four in the Fall	W 77–57	1–1	San Jose Arena; San Jose, California
Nov 17, 1998*	No. 6	Virginia Tech	L 70–72	1–2	Cameron Indoor Stadium; Durham, North Carolina
Nov 21, 1998*	No. 6	No. 11 Notre Dame	L 57–84	1–3	Joyce Center; Notre Dame, Indiana
Dec 6, 1998*	No. 20	at Vanderbilt	W 79–71	2–3	Memorial Gymnasium; Nashville, Tennessee
Nov 28, 1998*	No. 20	Villanova	W 75–47	3–3	Cameron Indoor Stadium; Durham, North Carolina
Nov 29, 1998*	No. 20	Marquette	W 91–60	4–3	Cameron Indoor Stadium; Durham, North Carolina
Dec 2, 1998	No. 16	Florida State	W 91–72	5–3 (1–0)	Cameron Indoor Stadium; Durham, North Carolina
Dec 6, 1998*	No. 16	vs. No. 3 Tennessee	L 60–74	5–4	Orlando, Florida
Dec 8, 1998*	No. 17	Hampton	W 83–47	6–4	Cameron Indoor Stadium; Durham, North Carolina
Dec 12, 1998*	No. 17	Temple	W 112–34	7–4	Cameron Indoor Stadium; Durham, North Carolina
Feb 4, 1999	No. 9	at Virginia	W 66–56	19–4 (11–0)	University Hall; Charlottesville, Virginia
Feb 7, 1999	No. 9	at Georgia Tech	W 74–73	20–4 (12–0)	Alexander Memorial Coliseum; Atlanta, Georgia
Feb 11, 1999	No. 7	Wake Forest	W 86–46	21–4 (13–0)	Cameron Indoor Stadium; Durham, North Carolina
Feb 14, 1999	No. 7	at No. 19 Clemson	L 75–80	21–5 (13–1)	Littlejohn Coliseum; Clemson, South Carolina
Feb 18, 1999	No. 8	NC State	W 75–67	22–5 (14–1)	Cameron Indoor Stadium; Durham, North Carolina
Feb 21, 1999	No. 8	No. 12 North Carolina	W 88–78	23–5 (15–1)	Cameron Indoor Stadium; Durham, North Carolina
ACC tournament
Feb 26, 1999*	(1) No. 10	vs. (8) Florida State; Semifinals	W 90–57	24–5	Charlotte Coliseum; Charlotte, North Carolina
Feb 28, 1999*	(1) No. 10	vs. (3) No. 13 Clemson; Championship game	L 71–76	24–6	Charlotte Coliseum; Charlotte, North Carolina
NCAA tournament
March 13, 1999*	(3 E) No. 10	(14 E) Holy Cross; First round	W 79–51	25–6	Cameron Indoor Stadium; Durham, North Carolina
March 15, 1999*	(3 E) No. 10	(6 E) Saint Joseph's; Second round	W 66–60	26–6	Cameron Indoor Stadium; Durham, North Carolina
March 20, 1999*	(3 E) No. 10	vs. (2 E) No. 5 Old Dominion; Regional Semifinal – Sweet Sixteen	W 76–63	27–6	Greensboro Coliseum; Greensboro, North Carolina
March 22, 1999*	(3 E) No. 10	vs. (1 E) No. 2 Tennessee; Regional Final – Elite Eight	W 69–63	28–6	Greensboro Coliseum; Greensboro, North Carolina
March 26, 1999*	(3 E) No. 10	vs. (3 ME) No. 12 Georgia; National Semifinal – Final Four	W 81–69	29–6	San Jose Arena (17,773); San Jose, California
March 28, 1999*	(3 E) No. 10	vs. (1 MW) No. 1 Purdue; National Championship Game	L 45–62	29–7	San Jose Arena (17,773); San Jose, California
*Non-conference game. ^{#}Rankings from AP Poll,. (#) Tournament seedings in parentheses. All times are in Eastern Time.

== Rankings ==
Ranking movements Legend: ██ Increase in ranking ██ Decrease in ranking т = Tied with team above or below
	Week																		
Poll	Pre	1	2	3	4	5	6	7	8	9	10	11	12	13	14	15	16	17	Final
AP	4	6	20	16	16	17	16	17	13	12	11	9	9	7	8	8	10	10 т	Not released
Coaches																			2

^Coaches did not release a Week 2 poll.

== See also ==
- 1998-99 Duke Blue Devils men's basketball team
