= 1998–99 NCAA Division I women's basketball rankings =

- Season: 1998–99
- NCAA Tournament: 1999
- Preseason No. 1: Tennessee
- NCAA Tournament Champions: Purdue
NCAA Division I women's basketball rankings


Two human polls comprise the 1998–99 NCAA Division I women's basketball rankings, the AP Poll and the Coaches Poll, in addition to various publications' preseason polls. The AP poll is currently a poll of sportswriters, while the USA Today Coaches' Poll is a poll of college coaches. The AP conducts polls weekly through the end of the regular season and conference play, while the Coaches poll conducts a final, post-NCAA tournament poll as well.

== Legend ==
–	No votes
(#)	Ranking

== AP Poll ==
Team	6-Nov	16-Nov	23-Nov	30-Nov	7-Dec	14-Dec	21-Dec	28-Dec	4-Jan	11-Jan	18-Jan	25-Jan	1-Feb	8-Feb	15-Feb	22-Feb	1-Mar	8-Mar
Purdue	5	1	4	4	3	3	3	3	3	3	3	2	2	2	2	1	1	1
Tennessee	1	4	3	3	2	2	2	2	2	1	1	1	1	1	1	2	2	2
Louisiana Tech	2	3	2	2	4	4	5	5	5	5	4	3	3	3	3	3	3	3
UConn	3	2	1	1	1	1	1	1	1	2	2	5	4	4	6	6	6	4
Old Dominion	15	15	9	8	10	15	13	13	11	11	12	12	11	8	5	5	5	5
Texas Tech	14	12	15	14	12	10	10	8	7	6	6	10	10	13	11	11	9	6
Colorado St.	–	–	16	12	11	9	9	11	8	8	8	6	5	5	4	4	4	7
Notre Dame	17	11	7	6	6	6	7	7	9	9	9	7	6	6	9	10	8	8
Rutgers	12	10	11	11	14	16	15	15	15	15	15	13	12	9	7	7	7	9
Georgia	7	7	6	5	5	5	4	4	4	4	5	4	8	10	T14	14	14	12
Virginia Tech	–	–	–	–	22	19	17	16	14	13	13	11	14	11	10	9	12	13
North Carolina	10	5	5	9	7	7	6	6	6	7	7	14	13	14	12	13	11	14
UCLA	6	14	12	10	8	8	8	9	10	10	10	8	7	12	13	12	16	15
Oregon	–	–	–	–	–	–	–	–	–	–	25	–	–	23	18	18	15	16
UC Santa Barbara	24	22	–	–	25	–	–	–	–	–	–	25	23	22	20	21	17	17
Penn St.	–	–	–	–	20	12	12	12	17	20	17	21	18	15	16	15	18	18
Iowa St.	T22	21	21	18	18	18	18	18	16	14	14	16	15	16	19	20	21	19
Virginia	8	8	17	15	21	22	23	22	22	22	19	T19	16	18	17	19	19	20
LSU	–	–	–	–	–	–	–	–	–	–	–	–	24	20	T23	17	20	21
Alabama	9	9	8	7	9	11	14	14	18	19	18	23	21	25	25	24	22	22
Tulane	–	–	–	–	–	–	–	–	–	–	24	18	–	–	–	–	24	23
FIU	–	–	–	–	–	–	–	–	–	–	–	–	25	24	T23	25	23	24
Toledo	–	–	–	–	–	–	–	–	–	–	–	–	–	–	–	–	–	25
Arizona	21	–	–	–	–	–	–	–	–	–	–	–	–	–	–	–	–	–
Arkansas	18	18	14	13	24	–	–	–	–	–	–	–	–	–	–	–	–	–
Auburn	–	–	–	–	–	–	–	–	–	25	20	17	19	17	22	23	–	–
Boston College	–	–	–	–	–	–	–	–	25	21	–	22	20	–	–	–	–	–
Florida	T22	20	13	21	17	13	20	20	19	18	21	–	–	–	–	–	–	–
George Washington	13	13	22	22	13	21	21	25	–	–	–	–	–	–	–	–	–	–
Illinois	25	24	25	–	–	–	–	–	–	–	–	–	–	–	–	–	–	–
Kansas	11	17	19	19	23	23	22	21	21	23	–	24	22	21	21	22	25	–
Memphis	–	–	–	–	–	24	24	23	24	–	–	–	–	–	–	–	–	–
Nebraska	–	23	24	23	19	20	19	19	20	24	23	–	–	–	–	–	–	–
North Carolina St.	16	16	10	17	–	–	–	–	–	–	–	–	–	–	–	–	–	–
Ohio St.	–	–	–	–	–	–	–	–	23	17	22	T19	–	–	–	–	–	–
Santa Clara	–	–	–	–	–	25	25	24	–	–	–	–	–	–	–	–	–	–
Stanford	19	–	–	24	–	–	–	–	–	–	–	–	–	–	–	–	–	–
Vanderbilt	20	19	18	20	–	–	–	–	–	–	–	–	–	–	–	–	–	–
Wisconsin	–	25	23	–	–	–	–	–	–	–	–	–	–	–	–	–	–	–
Clemson	–	–	–	25	15	14	11	10	12	16	16	15	17	19	T14	16	13	T10
Duke	4	6	20	16	16	17	16	17	13	12	11	9	9	7	8	8	10	T10

== USA Today Coaches poll ==
Source
