= Stephanie White =

American basketball player and coach (born 1977)

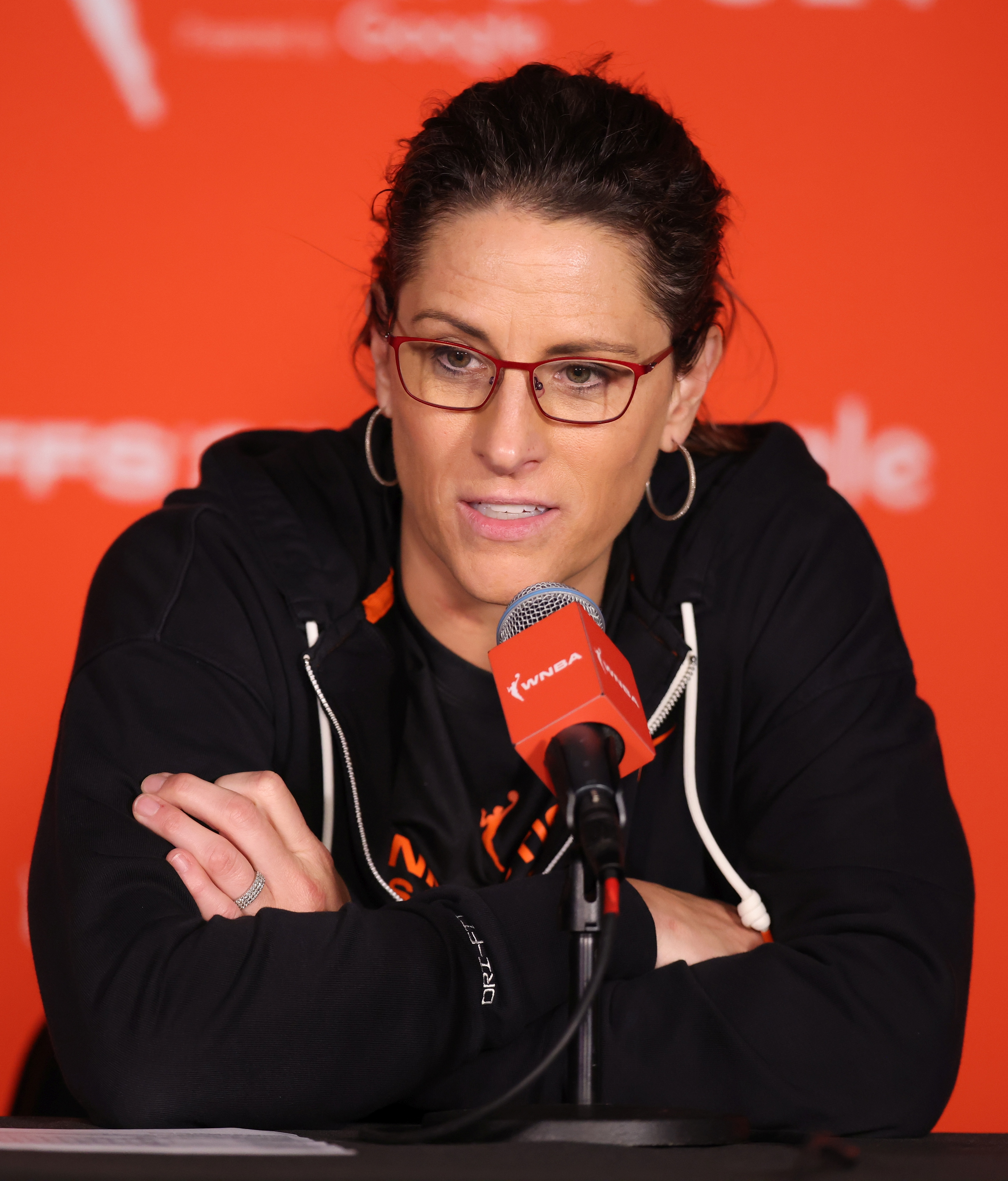
- White with the Connecticut Sun in 2024

Indiana Fever
- Title: Head coach
- League: WNBA

Personal information
- Born: June 20, 1977 (age 49) Danville, Illinois, U.S.
- Listed height: 5 ft 9 in (1.75 m)
- Listed weight: 155 lb (70 kg)

Career information
- High school: Seeger (West Lebanon, Indiana)
- College: Purdue (1995–1999)
- WNBA draft: 1999: 2nd round, 21st overall pick
- Drafted by: Charlotte Sting
- Playing career: 1999–2003
- Position: Shooting guard / small forward
- Number: 22
- Coaching career: 2003–present

Career history

Playing
- 1999: Charlotte Sting
- 2000–2004: Indiana Fever

Coaching
- 2003–2004: Ball State (assistant)
- 2004–2005: Kansas State (assistant)
- 2005–2007: Toledo (assistant)
- 2007–2010: Chicago Sky (assistant)
- 2011–2014: Indiana Fever (assistant)
- 2015–2016: Indiana Fever
- 2016–2021: Vanderbilt
- 2023–2024: Connecticut Sun
- 2025–present: Indiana Fever

Career highlights
- As head coach: WNBA Coach of the Year (2023); WNBA Commissioner's Cup Champion (2025); WNBA All-Star Game head coach (2023); As assistant coach: WNBA champion (2012); As player: NCAA champion (1999); Wade Trophy (1999); Honda Sports Award (1999); Consensus All-American (1999); Big Ten Athlete of the Year (1999); Big Ten Player of the Year (1999); Chicago Tribune Silver Basketball (1999); Women's Basketball Academic All-American of the Year (1999); Big Ten Tournament MOP (1999); 2× First-team All-Big Ten (1998, 1999); WBCA All-Star Game MVP (1995); USA Today Player of the Year (1995); Gatorade Player of the Year (1995); Indiana Miss Basketball (1995)
- Stats at Basketball Reference
Medals
Women's basketball
Representing United States
Jones Cup
Silver medal – second place	1997 Taipei	Team competition

Stephanie Joanne White (formerly Stephanie White-McCarty; born June 20, 1977) is an American professional basketball coach, analyst, and former player who is the head coach of the Indiana Fever of the Women's National Basketball Association (WNBA). She was previously head coach of the WNBA Connecticut Sun in the 2023 and 2024 seasons and Vanderbilt Commodores women's basketball team from 2016 to 2021. Before Vanderbilt, she was the head coach of the WNBA Indiana Fever for the 2015 and 2016 seasons. As an intercollegiate athlete, she was named the winner of the Wade Trophy in 1999, which recognizes the top female basketball player in the nation.

White was the 1995 Indiana Miss Basketball and was also named 1995 Gatorade National Player of the Year and the USA Today National Player of the Year. White attended Seeger High School in West Lebanon, Indiana, where she was named a High School All-American by the WBCA. She participated in the WBCA High School All-America Game in 1995, scoring seventeen points, and earning MVP honors. She led Purdue University to the 1999 NCAA Women's National Championship in basketball. She played five years in the WNBA, one with the Charlotte Sting and four with the Indiana Fever. She retired in 2004.

White began her coaching career with several assistant coaching positions at Ball State, Kansas State, and the University of Toledo before joining the Chicago Sky as an assistant coach in 2007. After serving as an assistant coach for four years, she became head coach of the Indiana Fever in 2014, leading the team to the WNBA Finals in her first season, 2015. White then served as head coach of the Vanderbilt Commodores from 2016 to 2021. Following a brief hiatus, she returned to the WNBA in 2023 to coach the Connecticut Sun, leading them to consecutive playoff appearances. She rejoined the Fever as head coach in 2024.

== College career ==
White attended Purdue University, where she was named National College Player of the Year, Indiana NCAA Woman of the Year, and Big Ten Conference Player of the Year on the way to leading Purdue to the NCAA National Championship in 1999.

== Professional career ==
=== WNBA ===
White began her five-year WNBA career with the Charlotte Sting in 1999 under her married name, Stephanie White-McCarty.

During the 2000 expansion draft on December 15, 1999, White was selected by the Miami Sol. She was then traded to the Indiana Fever in exchange for Sandy Brondello and a 2000 first-round draft pick. After four years with the Fever, she ranked third in games played (112) and three point field goals (92), and fourth in scoring (684). She averaged 5.9 points and 2.0 assists per game.

== National team career ==
White competed with USA Basketball as a member of the 1997 Jones Cup Team that won the silver medal in Taipei. Several of the games were close, with the USA team winning four games by six points or fewer, including an overtime game in the semifinal match against Japan. The gold medal game against South Korea was also close, but the USA fell 76–71 to claim the silver medal for the event. White was the second leading scorer for the team, averaging 10.3 points per game.

== Post-playing career ==
She retired from the WNBA after the 2004 season and went on to become the assistant coach at Ball State (2003–04), Kansas State (2004–05), and the University of Toledo (2005–07), before going to the Chicago Sky as an assistant coach.

A 1999 general communications major graduate, White sat out the 2002 season with an injury and worked as a television color commentator and sideline reporter during Fever Games. Since 2007, White has also served as a college basketball analyst for ESPN and the Big Ten Network, including studio work and co-hosting the network's coverage of the Big Ten Women's Basketball Tournament. White has also worked as an Indiana Pacers Reporter for FOX Sports Indiana.

White returned to the Indiana Fever as an assistant coach in 2011. When Lin Dunn retired as head coach of the Fever after the 2014 season, White became head coach. In her first season as head coach, Indiana went 20–14 overall and made their second WNBA Finals appearance, losing the best-of-five series to the Minnesota Lynx. White was the first rookie coach in WNBA history to lead a team to the WNBA Finals. In 2016, her second season with the Fever, the team made it to the playoffs for the 12th consecutive time, finished the season with a 17–17 record and lost in the first round of the playoffs to the Phoenix Mercury.

On May 23, 2016, White accepted the head coaching job for the Vanderbilt Commodores women's basketball team. She completed the 2016 season with the Fever, finishing her time there with a 37–31 overall record and a 6–6 record in the postseason. Through her five seasons at Vanderbilt, White compiled a 46–83 overall record and went 13–55 against Southeastern Conference competition. Her fifth season at Vanderbilt was shortened in January 2021 due to COVID-19 concerns, injuries, and a depleted roster. The school announced that White would not be returning as coach on April 6, 2021.

White returned to coaching in the WNBA in 2023 as head coach of the Connecticut Sun. The team had 27–13 and 28–12 records in 2023 and 2024, respectively, losing in the second round of the playoffs each time. White was named WNBA Coach of the Year. White and the Sun parted ways on October 28, 2024, following two consecutive playoff semifinals appearances.

She was hired by the Indiana Fever for a second stint on November 1.

== Career statistics ==
=== WNBA ===
Legend
GP	Games played	GS	Games started	MPG	Minutes per game	RPG	Rebounds per game
APG	Assists per game	SPG	Steals per game	BPG	Blocks per game	PPG	Points per game
TO	Turnovers per game	FG%	Field-goal percentage	3P%	3-point field-goal percentage	FT%	Free-throw percentage
**Bold**	Career best	°	League leader

*	Denotes season(s) in which White won an NCAA Championship

==== Regular season ====
WNBA regular season statistics
Year	Team	GP	GS	MPG	FG%	3P%	FT%	RPG	APG	SPG	BPG	TO	PPG
1999	Charlotte	30	5	18.8	**40.8**	35.4	90.9	1.6	1.7	0.6	0.1	**1.3**	5.3
2000	Indiana	**32**	**12**	19.8	39.8	38.6	82.6	**1.9**	1.8	1.0	0.2	1.5	**7.2**
2001	Indiana	30	0	16.8	38.0	**40.4**	77.4	1.8	1.9	0.9	**0.5**	**1.3**	5.6
2002	Did not play (injury)												
2003	Indiana	28	10	**20.6**	34.7	34.5	**93.8**	1.5	2.1	**1.2**	0.2	**1.3**	6.9
2004	Indiana	22	**12**	20.5	37.5	33.3	70.6	1.3	**2.4**	1.1	0.2	1.4	4.1
**Career**	5 years, 2 teams	142	39	19.2	38.1	36.5	83.1	1.6	2.0	0.9	0.2	1.3	5.9

==== Playoffs ====
WNBA playoff statistics
Year	Team	GP	GS	MPG	FG%	3P%	FT%	RPG	APG	SPG	BPG	TO	PPG
1999	Charlotte	0	0	0	0	0	0	0	0	0	0	0	0
**Career**	1 year, 1 team	0	0	0	0	0	0	0	0	0	0	0	0

=== College ===
NCAA statistics
Year	Team	GP	GS	MPG	FG%	3P%	FT%	RPG	APG	SPG	BPG	TO	PPG
1995–96	Purdue	31	—	—	.407	.373	.766	4.3	4.5	2.0	0.4	—	10.8
1996–97	Purdue	28	—	—	.435	.314	.784	5.2	4.4	2.1	0.4	—	16.4
1997–98	Purdue	33	—	—	.447	.324	**.844**	**6.1**	**4.8**	**2.4**	**0.5**	—	**20.6**
1998–99*	Purdue	**35**	—	—	**.468**	**.437**	.795	5.4	4.5	2.2	**0.5**	—	20.2
**Career**		127	—	—	.445	.365	.803	5.3	4.6	2.2	0.4	—	17.2

== Head coaching record ==
=== College ===
Record table
Season	Team	Overall	Conference	Standing	Postseason
Vanderbilt Commodores (Southeastern Conference) (2016–2021)
2016–17	Vanderbilt	14–16	4–12	13th	
2017–18	Vanderbilt	7–24	3–13	T-11th	
2018–19	Vanderbilt	7–23	2–14	14th	
2019–20	Vanderbilt	14–16	4–12	T-12th	
2020–21	Vanderbilt	4–4	0–3	14th	Season ended early due to COVID-19
Vanderbilt:		46–83 (.357)	13–54 (.194)		
Total:		46–83 (.357)			
National champion Postseason invitational champion Conference regular season champion Conference regular season and conference tournament champion Division regular season champion Division regular season and conference tournament champion Conference tournament champion

=== WNBA ===
Legend
Regular season	G	Games coached	W	Games won	L	Games lost	W–L %	Win–loss %
Playoffs	PG	Playoff games	PW	Playoff wins	PL	Playoff losses	PW–L %	Playoff win–loss %

Team	Year	G	W	L	W–L%	Finish	PG	PW	PL	PW–L%	Result
IND	2015	34	20	14	.588	3rd in East	11	6	5	.545	Lost in WNBA Finals
IND	2016	34	17	17	.500	3rd in East	1	0	1	.000	Lost in First Round
CON	2023	40	27	13	.675	2nd in East	7	3	4	.429	Lost in Semifinals
CON	2024	40	28	12	.700	2nd in East	7	4	3	.571	Lost in Semifinals
IND	2025	44	24	20	.545	3rd in East	8	4	4	.500	Lost in Semifinals
Career		192	116	76	.604		34	17	17	.500	

== Personal life ==
She married her high school sweetheart, Brent McCarty, in 1998. The couple divorced in 2002.

White earned a bachelor's degree in communications from Purdue University in 1999. She also earned Academic All-American honors twice and was inducted in Phi Beta Kappa. White was inducted into the Purdue Athletics Hall of Fame in 2006 and the CoSIDA Academic All-America Hall of Fame in 2017.

White publicly identified as a lesbian in 2015, starting a relationship with and marrying Michelle Fletcher. Due to the then active same-sex marriage ban in Indiana, the couple travelled to California to be legally married. In 2011, White gave birth to a first child. About two years later, the couple welcomed twin boys to their family.

White and her current partner, reporter Lisa Salters, reside in Nashville, Tennessee with Salters' son, and White's three sons.

== Awards and honors ==
- 1995 — Indiana Miss Basketball
- 1999 — Wade Trophy
- 1999 — Honda Sports Award for basketball
- 2006 — Purdue Athletics Hall of Fame
- 2017 — Purdue University Emerging Voice Award
- 2017 — CoSIDA Academic All-America Hall of Fame
- 2022 — Indiana Basketball Hall of Fame
