= 1998–99 Georgia Lady Bulldogs basketball team =

Intercollegiate basketball season

1998–99 Georgia Lady Bulldogs basketball

NCAA tournament, Final Four
- Conference: Southeastern Conference

Ranking
- Coaches: No. 4
- AP: No. 12
- Record: 27–7 (9–5 SEC)
- Head coach: Andy Landers (20th season)
- Home arena: Stegeman Coliseum

The 1998–99 Georgia Lady Bulldogs women's basketball team represented University of Georgia in the 1998–99 college basketball season. The Lady Bulldogs, led by 20th-year head coach Andy Landers, played their home games at Stegeman Coliseum and were members of the Southeastern Conference. They finished the season 27–7, 9–5 in SEC play to finish third in the regular season conference standings. Georgia was the No. 3 seed in the Mideast region of the NCAA tournament. They defeated Liberty, SMU, Clemson, and Iowa State to reach their third NCAA Final Four in five years. In the National semifinal game, the Lady Bulldogs were beaten by Duke.

== Roster ==
1998–99 Georgia Bulldogs women's basketball team
Players
Coaches

Pos.	#	Name	Height	Year	Previous school	Hometown
G	23	Kelly Miller	5 ft 10 in (1.78 m)	So	Mayo	Rochester, MN
G	35	Coco Miller	5 ft 10 in (1.78 m)	So	Mayo	Rochester, MN

Head coach

Andy Landers

Assistant coach(es)

Legend

- (C) Team captain
- (S) Suspended
- (I) Ineligible
- (W) Walk-on
- Injured
- Current redshirt

== Schedule ==
Date time, TV	Rank^{#}	Opponent^{#}	Result	Record	Site (attendance) city, state
Regular season
SEC tournament
NCAA tournament
Mar 22, 1999*	(3 ME)	vs. (4 ME) Iowa State; Regional Final – Elite Eight	W 89–71	27–6	Riverfront Coliseum; Cincinnati, OH
Mar 26, 1999*	(3 ME)	vs. (3 E) Duke; National Semifinal – Final Four	L 69–81	27–7	San Jose Arena (17,773); San Jose, CA
*Non-conference game. ^{#}Rankings from AP Poll. (#) Tournament seedings in parentheses. ME=Mideast. All times are in Eastern Time.

== Rankings ==
Ranking movements Legend: ██ Increase in ranking ██ Decrease in ranking
	Week																		
Poll	Pre	1	2	3	4	5	6	7	8	9	10	11	12	13	14	15	16	17	Final
AP	7	7	6	5	5	5	4	4	4	4	5	4	8	10	14	14	14	12	Not released
Coaches																		12	4
