= 1999 NCAA Division III women's basketball tournament =

- Teams: 48
- Finals site: O'Neill Center, Danbury, Connecticut
- Champions: Washington University Bears (2nd title)
- Runner-up: St. Benedict Blazers (1st title game)
- Third place: Salem State Vikings (4th Final Four)
- Fourth place: Scranton Royals (5th Final Four)
- Winning coach: Nancy Fahey (2nd title)
- Attendance: 27,128

The 1999 NCAA Division III women's basketball tournament was the 18th annual tournament hosted by the NCAA to determine the national champion of Division III women's collegiate basketball in the United States.

Defending champions Washington St. Louis defeated St. Benedict in the championship game, 74–65, to claim the Bears' second Division III national title, their second of four consecutive.

The championship rounds were hosted at the O'Neill Center at Western Connecticut State University in Danbury, Connecticut from March 18–19, 1999.

== Bracket ==
- An asterisk by a team indicates the host of first and second round games
- An asterisk by a score indicates an overtime period

=== Northeast sectional ===
First round March 3, 1999; Campus sites
Atlantic Region
St. Mary's (MD)*	73
Gallaudet	80
Southern Maine*	56
Babson	43
Northeast Region
Atlantic Region
Colby–Sawyer*	74
Hunter College	60
Bowdoin*	49
Bates	44
Northeast Region

Second round March 6, 1999; Campus sites
TCNJ*	71
Gallaudet	81
Southern Maine	46
Salem State*	53
Rowan*	72
Colby–Sawyer	50
Bowdoin	48
Williams*	72

Sectional semifinals March 12, 1999; Williamstown, MA
Gallaudet	65
Salem State	75
Rowan	56
Williams	62

Sectional finals March 13, 1999; Williamstown, MA
Salem State	76
Williams	60

=== West sectional ===
First round March 3, 1999; Campus sites
South Region
Randolph-Macon*	49
Austin	77
Wartburg*	41
St. Thomas (MN)	67
West Region
South Region
Bridgewater (VA)*	60
N.C. Wesleyan	69
Cal Lutheran	54
Pacific Lutheran*	56
West Region

Second round March 6, 1999; Campus sites
DePauw*	67
Austin	62
St. Thomas (MN)	68
St. Benedict*	76
Hardin-Simmons*	84
N.C. Wesleyan	62
Pacific Lutheran	60
Simpson*	57

Sectional semifinals March 12, 1999; St. Joseph, MN
DePauw	67
St. Benedict	78
Hardin-Simmons	34
Pacific Lutheran	54

Sectional finals March 13, 1999; St. Joseph, MN
St. Benedict	61
Pacific Lutheran	55

=== Mid-Atlantic sectional ===
First round March 3, 1999; Campus sites
East Region
St. Lawrence	61
Elmira*	52
Johns Hopkins*	61
Cabrini	53
Mid-Atlantic Region
East Region
William Smith*	62
Hartwick	47
Susquehanna*	63
Gwynedd Mercy	66
Mid-Atlantic Region

Second round March 6, 1999; Campus sites
NYU*	59
St. Lawrence	48
Johns Hopkins	53
Elizabethtown*	77
Cortland State*	56
William Smith	64
Gwynedd Mercy	64
Scranton*	75

Sectional semifinals March 12, 1999; Scranton, PA
NYU	87
Elizabethtown	70
William Smith	47
Scranton	64

Sectional finals March 13, 1999; Scranton, PA
NYU	60
Scranton	81

=== Great Lakes sectional ===
First round March 3, 1999; Campus sites
Central Region
Lakeland*	50
Wheaton (IL)	58
Capital*	86
Hope	75
Great Lakes Region
Central Region
Wisconsin–Eau Claire*	82
Lawrence	57
Calvin*	60
Ohio Wesleyan	50
Great Lakes Region

Second round March 6, 1999; Campus sites
Washington St. Louis*	75
Wheaton (IL)	38
Capital	82
Defiance*	72
Wisconsin–Oshkosh*	70
Wisconsin–Eau Claire	60
Calvin	75
Baldwin Wallace*	67

Sectional semifinals March 12, 1999; Grand Rapids, MI
Washington St. Louis	77*
Capital	70
Wisconsin–Oshkosh	61
Calvin	59

Sectional finals March 13, 1999; Grand Rapids, MI
Washington St. Louis	56
Wisconsin–Oshkosh	55

=== Final Four ===
Final Four; O'Neill Center; Danbury, CT; March 19, 1999
Salem State	54
St. Benedict	74
Scranton	65
Washington St. Louis	74

National championship O'Neill Center; Danbury, CT; March 19, 1999
St. Benedict	65
Washington St. Louis	74
Third place
Salem State	75
Scranton	65

== All-tournament team ==
- Tasha Rodgers, Washington University in St. Louis
- Alia Fischer, Washington University in St. Louis
- Molly Mark, St. Benedict
- Robyn Ruschmeier, St. Benedict
- Dee Jackson, Salem State

== See also ==
- 1999 NCAA Division I women's basketball tournament
- 1999 NCAA Division II women's basketball tournament
- 1999 NAIA Division I women's basketball tournament
- 1999 NAIA Division II women's basketball tournament
- 1999 NCAA Division III men's basketball tournament
