= 1999 NAIA Division I women's basketball tournament =

- Teams: 32
- Finals site: Oman Arena, Jackson, Tennessee
- Champions: Oklahoma City Stars (2nd title, 2nd title game, 2nd Fab Four)
- Runner-up: Simon Fraser Clan (1st title game, 2nd Fab Four)
- Semifinalists: Freed–Hardeman Lions (1st Fab Four); Southern Nazarene Redskins (8th Fab Four)
- Coach of the year: Kent Stanley (Oklahoma City)
- Player of the year: Hazel Taylor (Wayland Baptist)
- Charles Stevenson Hustle Award: Teresa Kleindiest (Simon Fraser)
- Chuck Taylor MVP: Patty Cantella (Oklahoma City)
- Top scorer: Qiana Elam (Freed–Hardeman) (83 points)

The 1999 NAIA Division I women's basketball tournament was the tournament held by the NAIA to determine the national champion of women's college basketball among its Division I members in the United States and Canada for the 1998–99 basketball season.

Oklahoma City defeated Simon Fraser in the championship game, 72–55, to claim the Stars' second NAIA national title and first since 1988. This was the first appearance in the championship game for a team from Canada.

The tournament was played at the Oman Arena in Jackson, Tennessee.

== Qualification ==
The tournament field remained fixed at thirty-two teams, with the top sixteen teams receiving seeds.

The tournament continued to utilize a simple single-elimination format.

== Bracket ==
First round
1	Southern Nazarene	76
Indiana–South Bend	70
Louisiana College	95
16	Cumberland	87
9	East Texas Baptist	74
Central State (OH)	81
Lee (TN)	58
8	Montana State Northern	79
5	Lipscomb	66
S. California College	71
The Master's	66
12	Oklahoma Baptist	91
13	North Georgia	77
Lambuth	78
NW Oklahoma State	33
4	Simon Fraser	72
3	Union (TN)	81
Langston	72
Rio Grande	72
14	Incarnate Word	86
11	Lewis–Clark State	76
Lindsey Wilson	61
Xavier Louisiana	53
6	Oklahoma City	83
7	Auburn Montgomery	70
McKendree	53
Morris	77
10	Georgia Southwestern	68
15	Findlay	66
Freed–Hardeman	74
St. Edward's (TX)	77
2	Wayland Baptist	93

Second round
1	Southern Nazarene	82
Louisiana College	77
Central State (OH)	45
8	Montana State Northern	64
S. California College	80
12	Oklahoma Baptist	94
Lambuth	70
4	Simon Fraser	79
3	Union (TN)	108
14	Incarnate Word	86
11	Lewis-Clark State	67
6	Oklahoma City	81
7	Auburn Montgomery	77
Morris	37
Freed–Hardeman	92*
2	Wayland Baptist	91

Elite Eight
1	Southern Nazarene	79
8	Montana State Northern	59
12	Oklahoma Baptist	57
4	Simon Fraser	85
3	Union (TN)	56
6	Oklahoma City	64
7	Auburn Montgomery	48
Freed–Hardeman	55

Final Four
1	Southern Nazarene	66
4	Simon Fraser	71
6	Oklahoma City	72
Freed–Hardeman	55

National championship
4	Simon Fraser	55
6	Oklahoma City	72

== See also ==
- 1999 NAIA Division I men's basketball tournament
- 1999 NCAA Division I women's basketball tournament
- 1999 NCAA Division II women's basketball tournament
- 1999 NCAA Division III women's basketball tournament
- 1999 NAIA Division II women's basketball tournament
