= 1999 NAIA Division II men's basketball tournament =

Men's Basketball Tournament

- Teams: 32
- Finals site: Idaho Center; Nampa, Idaho
- Champions: Cornerstone Golden Eagles (1st title, 1st title game, 1st Fab Four)
- Runner-up: Bethel Pilots (4th title game, 4th Fab Four)
- Semifinalists: Berea Mountaineers (1st Fab Four); Mount Senario Fighting Saints (1st Fab Four)
- Charles Stevenson Hustle Award: Ryan Bales (Bethel (IN))
- Chuck Taylor MVP: Mike Long (Cornerstone)
- Top scorer: Eric Brand (Bethel (IN)) (136 points)

The 1999 NAIA Division II men's basketball tournament was the tournament held by the NAIA to determine the national champion of men's college basketball among its Division II members in the United States and Canada for the 1998–99 basketball season.

Top-seeded Cornerstone defeated two-time defending champions Bethel (IN) in the championship game, 113–109 after one overtime period, to claim the Golden Eagles' first NAIA national title.

The tournament was played at the Idaho Center at Northwest Nazarene University in Nampa, Idaho.

== Qualification ==
The tournament field remained fixed at thirty-two teams, and the top sixteen teams were seeded.

The tournament continued to utilize a single-elimination format.

== Bracket ==
First round
1	Cornerstone	88
Doane	72
Western Oregon	91
16	Jamestown	63
9	Mount Vernon Nazarene	87
Huron	97
Bethany (KS)	73
8	Albertson	78
5	MidAmerica Nazarene	68
Viterbo	76
Husson	78
12	Cal State Hayward	94
13	Berea	86
Briar Cliff	76
Green Mountain	75
4	Milligan	94
3	Southern Oregon	87
Bluefield (VA)	88
Mount Senario	100
14	Saint Joseph's (ME)	72
11	Northwestern (IA)	72
Evangel	64
Caldwell	68
6	Siena Heights	92
7	Embry–Riddle (FL)	97
Bellevue	73
Holy Family	76
10	Black Hills State	100
15	Cardinal Stritch	95
Cal State Monterey Bay	67
Northwest Nazarene	90
2	Bethel (IN)	96

Second round
1	Cornerstone	107
Western Oregon	92
Huron	81
8	Albertson	70
Viterbo	91
12	Cal State Hayward	82
13	Berea	94
4	Milligan	84
Bluefield (VA)	71
Mount Senario	85
11	Northwestern (IA)	67
6	Siena Heights	53
7	Embry–Riddle (FL)	72
10	Black Hills State	78
15	Cardinal Stritch	91
2	Bethel (IN)	111

Quarterfinals
1	Cornerstone	72
Huron	70
Viterbo	74
13	Berea	85
Mount Senario	77
11	Northwestern (IA)	73
10	Black Hills State	72
2	Bethel (IN)	89

Semifinals
1	Cornerstone	100
13	Berea	85
Mount Senario	72
2	Bethel (IN)	90

National championship
1	Cornerstone	113*
2	Bethel (IN)	109

== See also ==
- 1999 NAIA Division I men's basketball tournament
- 1999 NCAA Division I men's basketball tournament
- 1999 NCAA Division II men's basketball tournament
- 1999 NCAA Division III men's basketball tournament
- 1999 NAIA Division II women's basketball tournament
