= 1999 NAIA Division I men's basketball tournament =

College basketball tournament

- Teams: 32
- Finals site: Donald W. Reynolds Center; Tulsa, Oklahoma
- Champions: Life (2 title, 3 title game, 3 Fab Four)
- Runner-up: Mobile (1 title game, 1 Fab Four)
- Semifinalists: Westmont (2 Final Four); Azusa Pacific (2 Final Four)
- Charles Stevenson Hustle Award: Chris Gonzalez (Westmont)
- Chuck Taylor MVP: Corey Evans (Life)

The 1999 NAIA Men's Division I Basketball Tournament was held in March at Donald W. Reynolds Center in Tulsa, Oklahoma, and the only time for now NAIA Tournament. The 62nd annual NAIA basketball tournament featured 32 teams playing in a single-elimination format.

== Awards and honors ==
- Leading scorers:
- Leading rebounder:
- Player of the Year: Jay Mauck (Oklahoma Christian).

== 1999 NAIA bracket ==
First round	Second round
1	Incarnate Word	72
-	Wilberforce	56
1	Incarnate Word	55
16	Biola	57
16	Biola	51
-	Lipscomb	46
TOP TIER
9	College of West Virginia	81
-	Southern Nazarene	48
9	College of West Virginia	76
8	Mobile	79
8	Mobile	62
-	NW Oklahoma State	55
-	The Master’s	85
5	Georgia Southwestern State	75
-	The Master’s	66
12	Oklahoma Baptist	79
12	Oklahoma Baptist	80
-	Auburn Montgomery	63
TOP TIER
13	Westmont	76
-	St. Xavier	61
13	Westmont	75
4	Georgetown (KY)	53
4	Georgetown (KY)	102
-	Voorhees	68
-	Concordia (CA)	90
3	Lindsey Wilson	77
-	Concordia	58
-	Columbia	53
-	Columbia (MO)	62
14	Birmingham–Southern	56
BOTTOM TIER
-	Life	64
11	Faulkner	58
-	Life	87
6	Oklahoma City	74
6	Oklahoma City	85
-	Houston Baptist	61
7	Azusa Pacific	75
-	Edward Waters	67
7	Azusa Pacific	87
-	Findlay	68
-	Findlay	69
10	Oklahoma Christian	57
BOTTOM TIER
-	Olivet Nazarene	73
15	Spring Hill	68
-	Olivet Nazarene	56
2	Union	66
2	Union (TN)	58
-	Montana Tech	45

Elite Eight
16	Biola	59
8	Mobile	71
12	Oklahoma Baptist	79
13	Westmont	67
-	Concordia	67
-	Life	83
7	Azusa Pacific	85
2	Union	77

NAIA national semifinals
8	Mobile	71
13	Westmont	63
-	Life	77
7	Azusa Pacific	71

NAIA national championship
8	Mobile	60
-	Life	63

- * denotes overtime.

== See also ==
- 1999 NCAA Division I men's basketball tournament
- 1999 NCAA Division II men's basketball tournament
- 1999 NCAA Division III men's basketball tournament
- 1999 NAIA Division II men's basketball tournament
- 1999 NAIA Division I women's basketball tournament
