= 1999 NCAA Division II men's basketball tournament =

- Teams: 48
- Finals site: Commonwealth Convention Center, Louisville, Kentucky
- Champions: Kentucky Wesleyan (7th title)
- Runner-up: Metro State (1st title game)
- Semifinalists: Florida Southern (6th Final Four); Truman (1st Final Four)
- Winning coach: Ray Harper (1st title)
- MOP: Antonio Garcia (Kentucky Wesleyan)

The 1999 NCAA Division II men's basketball tournament was the 43rd annual single-elimination tournament to determine the national champion of men's NCAA Division II college basketball in the United States.

Officially culminating the 1998–99 NCAA Division II men's basketball season, the tournament featured forty-eight teams from around the country.

The Elite Eight, national semifinals, and championship were again played at the Commonwealth Convention Center in Louisville, Kentucky.

Kentucky Wesleyan (35–2) defeated Metro State in the final, 75–60, to win their record seventh Division II national championship. This title came one year after the Panthers' loss to UC Davis in the 1998 championship.

Kentucky Wesleyan was coached by Ray Harper. For the second consecutive year, KWC's Antonio Garcia was the Most Outstanding Player.

1999 NCAA Division II Men's sites - regionals (cyan) Elite Eight (red)

== Regionals ==
=== Northeast - Albany, New York ===
Location: Recreation and Convocation Center Host: College of Saint Rose

First round Round of 48; March 6
4	New Hampshire College	76
5	Saint Michael's	87
3	Pace	56
6	Adelphi	57

Regional semifinals Round of 32; March 7
1	Saint Rose	78
5	Saint Michael's	67
2	Saint Anselm	50
6	Adelphi	66

Regional final Sweet 16; March 8
1	Saint Rose	72
6	Adelphi	67

=== South Central - Wichita Falls, Texas ===
Location: Gerald Stockton Court Host: Midwestern State University

First round Round of 48; March 4
4	Truman State	81
5	Missouri Western	69
3	West Texas A&M	96
6	Abilene Christian (3OT)	102

Regional semifinals Round of 32; March 5
1	Midwestern State	68
4	Truman State	81
2	Pittsburg State	59
6	Abilene Christian	79

Regional final Sweet 16; March 6
4	Truman State	76
6	Abilene Christian	69

=== East - Salem, West Virginia ===
Location: T. Edward Davis Gymnasium Host: Salem-Teikyo University

First round Round of 48; March 4
4	Charleston	79
5	West Chester	77
3	California (PA)	72
6	Queens (NC)	83

Regional semifinals Round of 32; March 5
1	Salem-Teikyo	74
4	Charleston	60
2	Fairmont State	61
6	Queens (NC)	54

Regional final Sweet 16; March 6
1	Salem-Teikyo	73
2	Fairmont State	69

=== North Central - Wayne, Nebraska ===
Location: Rice Auditorium Host: Wayne State College

First round Round of 48; March 4
4	Nebraska–Kearney	85
5	Northern State	80
3	South Dakota	79
6	Mesa State	74

Regional semifinals Round of 32; March 5
1	Wayne State (NE)	92
4	Nebraska–Kearney (OT)	94
2	Metro State	83
3	South Dakota	69

Regional final Sweet 16; March 6
4	Nebraska–Kearney	69
2	Metro State	78

=== South Atlantic - Milledgeville, Georgia ===
Location: Centennial Center Host: Georgia College & State University

First round Round of 48; March 4
4	Lander	68
5	Catawba	59
3	Elizabeth City State	60
6	Winston-Salem State	71

Regional semifinals Round of 32; March 5
1	Georgia College & State	46
4	Lander	49
2	Wingate	63
6	Winston-Salem State (OT)	66

Regional final Sweet 16; March 6
4	Lander	47
6	Winston-Salem State	46

=== Great Lakes - Owensboro, Kentucky ===
Location: Sportscenter Host: Kentucky Wesleyan College

First round Round of 48; March 4
4	Lewis	77
5	Northern Michigan	83
3	Southern Indiana	89
6	Northwood (MI)	79

Regional semifinals Round of 32; March 5
1	Kentucky Wesleyan	93
5	Northern Michigan	72
2	Wayne State (MI)	69
3	Southern Indiana	72

Regional final Sweet 16; March 6
1	Kentucky Wesleyan	76
3	Southern Indiana	64

=== South - Memphis, Tennessee ===
Location: Bruce Hall Host: LeMoyne-Owen College

First round Round of 48; March 4
4	Henderson State	76
5	West Georgia	54
3	Lynn	83
6	Paine	71

Regional semifinals Round of 32; March 5
1	LeMoyne–Owen	68
4	Henderson State	76
2	Florida Southern	77
3	Lynn	69

Regional final Sweet 16; March 6
4	Henderson State	63
2	Florida Southern	73

=== West - Ellensburg, Washington ===
Location: Nicholson Pavilion Host: Central Washington University

First round Round of 48; March 4
4	Cal State San Bernardino	73
5	Sonoma State	62
3	Hawaii Pacific	61
6	Seattle Pacific	83

Regional semifinals Round of 32; March 5
1	Central Washington	71
4	Cal State San Bernardino	87
2	Cal Davis	68
6	Seattle Pacific	73

Regional final Sweet 16; March 6
4	Cal State San Bernardino	74
6	Seattle Pacific	67

== Elite Eight - Louisville, Kentucky ==
Location: Commonwealth Convention Center Host: Bellarmine College

National Quarterfinals; Elite Eight; March 17
NC	Metro State	89
E	Salem-Teikyo	84
SC	Truman	106***
NE	Saint Rose	101
Louisville, Kentucky
S	Florida Southern	84
W	Cal State San Bernardino	69
GL	Kentucky Wesleyan	74
SA	Lander	69

National semifinals Final Four; March 18
NC	Metro State	69
SC	Truman	65
S	Florida Southern	67
GL	Kentucky Wesleyan	87

National championship March 20
NC	Metro State	60
GL	Kentucky Wesleyan	75

== All-tournament team ==
- Antonio Garcia, Kentucky Wesleyan (MOP)
- Dana Williams, Kentucky Wesleyan
- Lee Barlow, Metro State
- DeMarcos Anzures, Metro State
- Innocent Kere, Florida Southern

== See also ==
- 1999 NCAA Division II women's basketball tournament
- 1999 NCAA Division I men's basketball tournament
- 1999 NCAA Division III men's basketball tournament
- 1999 NAIA Division I men's basketball tournament
- 1999 NAIA Division II men's basketball tournament
