= Gail Goestenkors =

American basketball coach

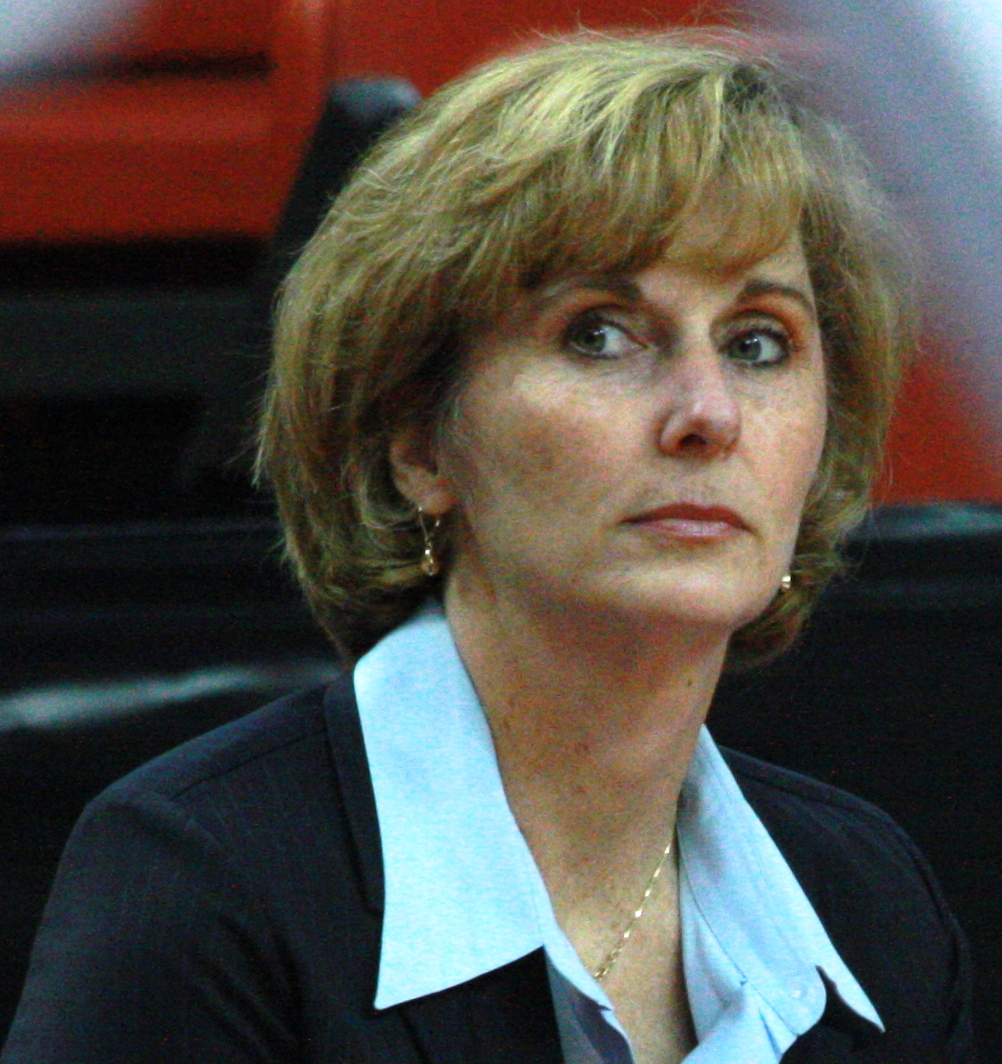
- Goestenkors in 2009

Biographical details
- Born: February 26, 1963 (age 63); Waterford, Michigan, U.S.

Playing career
- 1981–1985: Saginaw Valley State
- Position: Point guard

Coaching career (HC unless noted)
- 1985–1986: Iowa State (grad. asst.)
- 1986–1992: Purdue (asst.)
- 1992–2007: Duke
- 2007–2012: Texas
- 2014: Los Angeles Sparks (asst.)
- 2015: Indiana Fever (asst.)
- 2020–2021: Central Michigan (AHC)
- 2021–2022: Kentucky (asst.)

Head coaching record
- Overall: 498–163 (.753)

Accomplishments and honors

Awards
- 4× NCAA Regional—Final Four (1999, 2002, 2003, 2006); 7× ACC Coach of the Year (1996, 1998, 1999, 2002–2004, 2007); Naismith Coach of the Year (2003); WBCA National Coach of the Year (2003); AP Coach of the Year (2007)
- Women's Basketball Hall of Fame
Medal record
Women's basketball
Assistant Coach for United States
Olympic Games
Gold medal – first place	2008 Beijing	Team competition
Assistant Coach for United States
FIBA World Championship for Women
Bronze medal – third place	2006 Brazil	Team competition
Head Coach for United States
FIBA Under-19 Women's Basketball World Cup
Gold medal – first place	2005 Tunis	Team competition
Assistant Coach for United States
Olympic Games
Gold medal – first place	2004 Athens	Team competition
Assistant Coach for United States
FIBA World Championship for Women
Gold medal – first place	2002 China	Team competition
Head Coach for United States
William Jones Cup
Silver medal – second place	1997 Taipei	Team competition

Gail Ann Goestenkors (born February 26, 1963) is an American basketball coach who was most recently an assistant coach for the Kentucky Wildcats women's basketball team.

She is perhaps best known as the women's college basketball head coach of Duke University and the University of Texas at Austin. She led Duke from 1992 until 2007, when she was hired to replace the retiring Jody Conradt at Texas. Goestenkors left Texas following the 2011–12 season citing fatigue.

At Duke, Goestenkors received recognition as the ACC Coach of the Year a record 7 times (1996, 1998, 1999, 2002, 2003, 2004, and 2007). In the 2001–02 season, Goestenkors led the Blue Devils to the first undefeated regular season in ACC women's basketball history — a feat she repeated two more times during her tenure at Duke (2003, 2007). During her final ten seasons at Duke, Goestenkors led the Blue Devils to NCAA Tournament Sweet Sixteen appearances every year, seven Elite Eight appearances, four Final Four appearances, and two appearances in the NCAA Championship game. During her tenure, her teams won five ACC tournament championships and eight ACC regular season titles. Goestenkors holds the ACC record for fewest games required to achieve 300 wins (387 games).

In 2014–15, she was an assistant coach with the Indiana Fever and the Los Angeles Sparks of the Women's National Basketball Association.

Born in Waterford, Michigan, Goestenkors attended Saginaw Valley State University, where she played under future Purdue head coach Marsha Reall. After graduating in 1985, Goestenkors became a graduate assistant coach at Iowa State. After one season, she left to become an assistant coach at Purdue under Lin Dunn, where she remained until becoming head coach at Duke in 1992.

Goestenkors was inducted into the Women's Basketball Hall of Fame as one of six members of the Class of 2015.

== Duke ==
Goestenkors was head coach at Duke from 1992 to 2007, during which time she went 396-99. She led Duke to four Final Four appearances and reached the NCAA's round of 16 or better for 10 years in a row.

Goestenkors' 1998-99 Duke team finished in second place, losing to the Carolyn Peck-coached Purdue Lady Boilermakers in the championship game. Along the way, Duke defeated the Tennessee Lady Vols in the Elite Eight, spoiling Chamique Holdsclaw's bid for a clean sweep of the national championship (Holdsclaw had starred on Tennessee's national championship teams as a freshman, sophomore and junior). Duke's historic upset ended the Lady Vols' three-year run of national championships with a 69–63 victory over Tennessee in the final of the 1999 East Regionaland that sent shock waves through the sport.

Goestenkors led the Blue Devils to an ACC-record 35-2 ledger in 2002-03 and their second straight NCAA Final Four appearance. For the second consecutive year, Duke posted a 19–0 record against ACC opponents. The 2001–02 season produced similar success. She led the Blue Devils to a 31–4 record and an NCAA Final Four appearance. Duke became the first ACC school to produce an undefeated 19–0 record in the ACC by winning the regular season and Tournament titles. The Blue Devils in 2000-01 posted a 30–4 record, won ACC Tournament and ACC regular season championships and earned a No. 1 seed in the NCAA Tournament. The 2006–2007 season ended with a 32–2 record and notched her school's first ever undefeated regular season. She is often known as the "winningest coach not to have won a championship", being runner-up two times in fifteen years. Goestenkors also won the ACC Coach of the Year award in 2007 for the seventh time in fifteen years.

In 2003–04 with Beard leading the way, the Blue Devils advanced to the NCAA Elite Eight, boasted a 30–4 record, won a fifth-straight ACC Tournament championship and fourth-straight ACC regular season title, and broke the University of Connecticut's 69-game home winning steak with a 68-67 comeback victory in Hartford, Connecticut.

Goestenkors' 2004-05 squad made the NCAA Elite Eight and posted a 31–5 record despite the loss of National Player of the Year Alana Beard to graduation.

In 2007 she left Duke to become the head coach at Texas.

== Texas ==
Goestenkors was the head coach at Texas from 2007-2012. In her five years she never had a losing season and her teams made it to the NCAA tournament every year. But her teams lost in the first round the last four years and she didn't win any Big 12 championships. In 2012, with 2 years left on her contract, she resigned saying she was "tired" and needed to step away from basketball. Her Texas teams went 102-64.

== WNBA ==
Goestenkors returned to coaching in 2014, when she was hired as an assistant coach with the WNBA's Los Angeles Sparks. The next year she was an assistant coach with the Indiana Fever in a season when they played for the WNBA Championship.

== Central Michigan ==
After another break, Goestenkors served as the assistant head coach at Central Michigan during the 2020-2021 season. Central Michigan came in 2nd in their conference and went to the NCAA Tournament that season.

== Kentucky ==
For the 2021-2022 season, Goestenkors was an assistant coach at Kentucky as they won the SEC Conference Tournament Championship and advanced to the 2nd Round of the NCAA Tournament.

== USA Basketball ==
Goestenkors served as the head coach of the USA representative to the 1997 William Jones Cup competition The event was held in Taipei, Taiwan during August 1997. The USA team won their first six games. Four of the six were decided by six points or fewer, including the semifinal game against Japan which went to overtime. In the gold medal game, the USA faced undefeated South Korea. The Americans played to a six-point lead early in the second half, but could not extend the margin. South Korea came back, took the lead, and held on to win the championship and the gold medal 76–71.

Goestenkors served as an assistant coach to the national team in the 2002 World Championships, held during September in three cities in China, including Nanjing, China. The USA won the opening six preliminary rounds easily, with no contest closer than 30 points. That included the opening round game against Russia, who has played them close in the 1998 Championship final. In the opening game, the USA won 89–55 behind 20 points form Lisa Leslie and 17 from Sheryl Swoopes. The USA wasn't seriously challenged in the quarterfinals, where they beat Spain by 39 points. The semifinal game against Australia was closer, but Leslie had a double-double with 24 points and 13 rebounds to help the USA team win by 15 points. In the championship game, much like the 1998 finals, the rematch was much closer. This time team USA did not have to play from behind, and had a ten-point lead late in the game, but the Russians cut the lead to a single point with just over three minutes remaining. The game remained close, and was within three points with just over twelve seconds to go, but Swoopes was fouled and sank the free throws to give the Americans a 79–74 win and the gold medal.

Goestenkors served as an assistant coach for the USA National team in 2006, a team in transition. Lisa Leslie, who had led the team in scoring in the 2004 Olympics, the 2002 World Championships, the 2000 Olympics, the 1998 World Championships, and the 1996 Olympics was no longer on the team. Sheryl Swoopes was available but hampered by injuries, and Dawn Staley moved on to coaching. Newcomers Sue Bird, Candace Parker and Diana Taurasi picked up the slack, but it was a team in transition. As an additional challenge, some members of the squad were unable to join the team for practices due to WNBA commitments. The team started out strong, winning each of the six preliminary games, including the game against Russia. In the quarterfinals, the USA team beat Spain 90–56. The semifinal was a rematch against Russia, but this time the Russian team prevailed, 75–68. The USA faced Brazil in the bronze medal game, and won easily 99–59.

== Awards ==
- Associated Press National Coach of the Year (2007)
- ACC Coach of the Year (1996, 1998, 1999, 2002, 2003, 2004, 2007)
- WBCA District Coach of the Year (1995, 2001, 2002, 2003, 2004)
- USA Basketball National Coach of the Year (2006)
- WBCA National Coach of the Year (2003, 2007)
- Victor Award Coach of the Year (1999, 2003)
- Naismith National Coach of the Year (2003)
- GBallMag.com Coach of the Year (2002)
- Basketball Times Coach of the Year (2000)
- Carol Eckman Award (2006)
- US Basketball Writers Association (USBWA) Coach of the Year award (2007)

== Head coaching record ==
Record table
Season	Team	Overall	Conference	Standing	Postseason
Duke Blue Devils (Atlantic Coast Conference) (1992–2007)
1992–93	Duke	12–15	3–13	9th	
1993–94	Duke	16–11	7–9	5th	
1994–95	Duke	22–9	10–6	4th	NCAA Second Round
1995–96	Duke	26–7	12–4	2nd	NCAA Second Round
1996–97	Duke	19–11	9–7	T–3rd	NCAA Second Round
1997–98	Duke	24–8	13–3	1st	NCAA Elite Eight
1998–99	Duke	29–7	15–1	1st	NCAA Runner-Up
1999–00	Duke	28–6	12–4	2nd	NCAA Sweet Sixteen
2000–01	Duke	30–4	13–3	1st	NCAA Sweet Sixteen
2001–02	Duke	31–4	16–0	1st	NCAA Final Four
2002–03	Duke	35–2	16–0	1st	NCAA Final Four
2003–04	Duke	30–4	15–1	1st	NCAA Elite Eight
2004–05	Duke	31–5	12–2	T–1st	NCAA Elite Eight
2005–06	Duke	31–4	12–2	T–2nd	NCAA Runner-Up
2006–07	Duke	32–2	14–0	1st	NCAA Sweet Sixteen
Duke:		396–99 (.800)	179–55 (.765)		
Texas Longhorns (Big 12 Conference) (2007–2012)
2007–08	Texas	22–13	7–9	T–7th	NCAA Second Round
2008–09	Texas	21–12	8–8	6th	NCAA First Round
2009–10	Texas	22–11	10–6	T–4th	NCAA First Round
2010–11	Texas	19–14	7–9	7th	NCAA First Round
2011–12	Texas	18–14	8–10	8th	NCAA First Round
Texas:		102–64 (.614)	40–42 (.488)		
Total:		498–163 (.753)			
National champion Postseason invitational champion Conference regular season champion Conference regular season and conference tournament champion Division regular season champion Division regular season and conference tournament champion Conference tournament champion

== Personal life ==
Goestenkors's ex-husband is Mark Simons, who was an assistant coach at a number of women's college basketball programs, including Georgia Tech, Auburn and Michigan State.
