= 1999 NCAA Division III men's basketball tournament =

American collegiate men's basketball tournament (1999)

- Teams: 48
- Finals site: , Salem, Virginia
- Champions: Wisconsin–Platteville (4th title)
- Runner-up: Hampden-Sydney (1st title game)
- Semifinalists: Connecticut College (1st Final Four); William Paterson (1st Final Four)
- Winning coach: Bo Ryan (UWP)
- MOP: Merrill Brunson (UWP)
- Attendance: 45,348

The 1999 NCAA Division III men's basketball tournament was the 25th annual single-elimination tournament to determine the national champions of National Collegiate Athletic Association (NCAA) men's Division III collegiate basketball in the United States.

The field contained forty-eight teams, and each program was allocated to one of four sectionals. All sectional games were played on campus sites, while the national semifinals, third-place final, and championship finals were contested at the Salem Civic Center in Salem, Virginia.

Defending champions Wisconsin–Platteville defeated Hampden-Sydney, 76–75 (in two overtimes), in the final, clinching a fourth overall title and a second consecutive championship.

The Pioneers (30–2) were coached by Bo Ryan, who claimed his fourth title at Platteville (1991, 1995, and 1998). Ryan departed for Division I Milwaukee after this season before eventually becoming the head coach for Wisconsin in 2001.

Merrill Brunson, also from Platteville, was named Most Outstanding Player.

== Bracket ==
=== Top left sectional ===
First round
Rochester	58
Hamilton	66
Bowdoin	68
Bridgewater State	48
Cortland State	85
RIT	49
Clark (MA)	51
Western Connecticut	70

Second round
St. John Fisher	70
Hamilton	72
Bowdoin	57
Trinity (CT)	71
Geneseo State	61
Cortland State	71
Western Connecticut	76
Connecticut College	94

Sectional semifinals
Hamilton	73
Trinity (CT)	89
Cortland State	66
Connecticut College	80

Sectional finals
Trinity (CT)	70
Connecticut College	73

=== Bottom left sectional ===
First round
John Carroll	68
Allegheny	62
Maryville (TN)	66
Rose–Hulman	59
Otterbein	104
Defiance	90
Christopher Newport	66
Randolph–Macon	68

Second round
Ohio Northern	83
John Carroll	88*
Maryville (TN)	53
Mississippi College	67
Wooster	89
Otterbein	80
Randolph–Macon	65
Hampden–Sydney	74

Sectional semifinals
John Carroll	78
Mississippi College	57
Wooster	66
Hampden–Sydney	74

Sectional finals
John Carroll	51
Hampden–Sydney	68

=== Top right sectional ===
First round
Franklin & Marshall	81
Johns Hopkins	66
Kings Point	66
New Jersey City	79
Lebanon Valley	72
Catholic	77
William Paterson	76
Staten Island	59

Second round
Wilkes	77
Franklin & Marshall	72
New Jersey City	56
Richard Stockton	62
Goucher	69
Catholic	73
William Paterson	58
Rowan	55

Sectional semifinals
Wilkes	50
Richard Stockton	60
Catholic	71
William Paterson	79

Sectional finals
Richard Stockton	49
William Paterson	50

=== Bottom right sectional ===
First round
Augsburg	102
Nebraska Wesleyan	91
Wheaton (IL)	81
Washington–St. Louis	79
Gustavus Adolphus	67
Pomona–Pitzer	37
Ripon	63
Illinois Wesleyan	58

Second round
UW–Platteville	85
Augsburg	53
Wheaton (IL)	60
Manchester	62
Upper Iowa	55
Gustavus Adolphus	58
Ripon	73
Franklin	81

Sectional semifinals
UW–Platteville	74
Manchester	65
Gustavus Adolphus	66
Franklin	65

Sectional finals
UW–Platteville	61
Gustavus Adolphus	47

=== National finals ===
- Site: Salem Civic Center, Salem, Virginia

National semifinals
Connecticut College	58
Hampden–Sydney	74
William Paterson	51
UW–Platteville	75

National championship
Hampden–Sydney	75
UW–Platteville	76**
National third-place
Connecticut College	92*
William Paterson	83

== See also ==
- 1999 NCAA Division I men's basketball tournament
- 1999 NCAA Division II men's basketball tournament
- 1999 NCAA Division III women's basketball tournament
- 1999 NAIA Division I men's basketball tournament
