= 1999 NCAA Division I women's basketball tournament =

American college basketball tournament

- Teams: 64
- Finals site: San Jose Arena, San Jose, California
- Champions: Purdue Boilermakers (1st title, 1st title game, 2nd Final Four)
- Runner-up: Duke Blue Devils (1st title game, 1st Final Four)
- Semifinalists: Louisiana Tech Lady Techsters (10th Final Four); Georgia Lady Bulldogs (5th Final Four)
- Winning coach: Carolyn Peck (1st title)
- MOP: Ukari Figgs (Purdue)

The 1999 NCAA Division I women's basketball tournament began on March 12, 1999, and concluded on March 28, 1999, when Purdue won its first national championship in any women's sport. The Final Four was held at the San Jose Arena in San Jose, California, on March 26–28, 1999. Purdue defeated Duke 62–45 in Carolyn Peck's final game as head coach for the Boilermakers. She had previously announced her intention of leaving Purdue after two seasons to coach the expansion WNBA Orlando Miracle.

The two finalists had recent "off the court" history. Duke's coach, Gail Goestenkors, was a former assistant coach at Purdue under Lin Dunn until becoming the Blue Devils' head coach in 1992. Dunn's firing from Purdue in 1996 and the subsequent player defections resulted in the unusual scenario that two Blue Devil players in the championship game had formerly transferred from Purdue. Purdue's Ukari Figgs was named Most Outstanding Player.

== Notable events ==
Tennessee, which had won the prior three national championships, was selected as a No. 1 seed, and started out strongly, beating Appalachian State, 113–54. They continued on easily through the second and third rounds, then faced Duke in the East regional final. Duke was the 3 seed, but had upset Old Dominion 76–63 to reach the regional final. Tennessee and Duke had met in the regular season, with the Lady Vols winning by 14. The game was played in North Carolina, but Tennessee fans outnumbered Duke fans. Tennessee's Chamique Holdsclaw, generally considered the top player in the college game, missed her first ten shots, and ended up with only eight points, her lowest point total of the year. Duke reached an eleven-point lead in the first half, but Tennessee started the second half strong, hitting four baskets in a row, and cut the lead to four points. Duke went over five minutes without scoring a basket, but Tennessee could only cut the lead to a single point. Duke's Georgia Schweitzer tied her career high with 22 points, and the Blue Devils advanced to the Final Four for the first time in their history.

Connecticut was the 1 seed in the Mideast regional, and hosted the first two rounds at their home court, Gampel Pavilion. The Huskies won their first game easily, beating St. Francis (PA) by 51 points. The second game, against Xavier, would prove to be very different. Xavier led by as many as ten points in the second half, and with just over two minutes to play, the Musketeers had an eight-point lead, 84–76. UConn scored six consecutive points to tie the game at 84 points each. With 37 seconds left in the game Xavier's Nikki Kremer was fouled, and headed to the line, having hit all eight free throw attempts on the day. She missed both attempts. After Shea Ralph missed a jumper, Tamika Williams snared the rebound and was fouled. With seven seconds left in the game she hit both free throws. Xavier tried two desperation shots, but missed both, and UConn narrowly escaped an upset on their own court.

Georgia faced Duke in one of the national semi-finals. Georgia hit nine of their sixteen three-point attempts, and held the Miller twins, who had been averaging 37 points per game, to only 31. Duke led at halftime, then went on a 14–5 run to extend the lead. Georgia later responded with a 13–4 run, but could not take the lead. Duke won the game, 81–69, and advanced to their first championship game.

Louisiana Tech returned to the Final Four, a year after reaching the championship game. However, Purdue came into the game riding a 30-game winning streak. Purdue's Ukari Figgs scored 18 points in the first half, leading to a 40–27 lead at halftime. The Lady Techsters fought back in the second half, and cut the lead to three points, but Purdue's Stephanie White-McCarty stole the ball for a score, and followed it with a shot-clock-beating basket to extend the lead back to seven points. Louisiana Tech did not get closer again, and the Boilermakers extended their winning streak to 31 games, and a place in the championship match with a 77–63 win.

== Tournament records ==
- Steals in a first or second round game – Old Dominion, recorded 25 steals in an East region first-round game against Tennessee Tech, tying the record for most steals in any NCAA tournament game, set by Maryland against Stephen F. Austin in 1989, since the statistic was first recorded in 1988.
- Personal fouls – Missouri State committed 36 personal fouls in a West region second-round game against Colorado State, setting the record for most personal fouls committed in an NCAA tournament game.

== Qualifying teams – automatic ==
Sixty-four teams were selected to participate in the 1999 NCAA Tournament. Thirty conferences were eligible for an automatic bid to the 1999 NCAA tournament.

Automatic bids
		Record		
Qualifying School	Conference	Regular Season	Conference	Seed
Appalachian State	Southern Conference	14–14	7–10	16
CSU-Northridge	Big Sky Conference	21–7	13–3	15
Clemson	ACC	24–5	11–5	2
Connecticut	Big East	27–4	17–1	1
Dartmouth	Ivy League	19–8	11–3	14
Evansville	Missouri Valley Conference	19–10	11–7	13
Florida A&M	MEAC	18–11	14–4	15
Grambling State	SWAC	25–4	16–0	12
Green Bay	Midwestern Collegiate	19–9	13–1	14
Holy Cross	Patriot League	21–7	11–1	14
Liberty	Big South Conference	21–7	9–1	14
Louisiana Tech	Sun Belt Conference	26–2	12–0	1
Northeastern	America East	22–7	13–5	13
Old Dominion	Colonial	26–3	16–0	2
Oral Roberts	Mid-Continent	17–12	8–6	16
Purdue	Big Ten	28–1	16–0	1
SMU	WAC	19–10	11–3	11
St. Francis (PA)	Northeast Conference	18–11	14–6	16
St. Joseph's	Atlantic 10	29–7	14–2	11
St. Mary's (CA)	West Coast Conference	26–6	10–4	12
St. Peter's	MAAC	25–5	15–3	13
Stephen F. Austin	Southland	17–11	12–6	15
Tennessee	SEC	28–2	13–1	1
Tennessee Tech	Ohio Valley Conference	21–8	14–4	15
Texas Tech	Big 12	28–3	14–2	2
Toledo	MAC	25–5	14–2	6
Tulane	Conference USA	24–5	12–4	6
UC-Santa Barbara	Big West Conference	26–3	15–0	10
UCF	Trans America	20–9	13–3	16
UCLA	Pac-10	23–7	15–3	3

== Qualifying teams – at-large ==
Thirty-four additional teams were selected to complete the sixty-four invitations.

At-large Bids
		Record		
Qualifying School	Conference	Regular Season	Conference	Seed
University of Alabama	Southeastern	19–10	7–7	5
University of Arizona	Pacific-10	17–10	12–6	6
Auburn University	Southeastern	19–8	8–6	5
Boston College	Big East	21–7	12–6	8
University of Cincinnati	Conference USA	22–8	12–4	12
Colorado State University	Western Athletic	31–2	14–0	2
Duke University	Atlantic Coast	24–6	15–1	3
Florida International University	Sun Belt	23–6	9–3	9
University of Florida	Southeastern	19–13	6–8	11
University of Georgia	Southeastern	23–6	9–5	3
University of Illinois	Big Ten	18–11	10–6	7
Iowa State University	Big 12	22–7	12–4	4
University of Kansas	Big 12	22–9	11–5	9
University of Kentucky	Southeastern	20–10	7–7	6
University of Louisville	Conference USA	21–10	12–4	10
Louisiana State University	Southeastern	20–7	10–4	4
University of Maine	America East	23–6	17–1	10
Marquette University	Conference USA	21–7	12–4	8
Mississippi State University	Southeastern	17–10	7–7	7
Missouri State University	Missouri Valley	24–6	15–3	7
University of Nebraska–Lincoln	Big 12	21–11	8–8	11
University of North Carolina	Atlantic Coast	26–7	11–5	4
North Carolina State University	Atlantic Coast	16–11	9–7	10
University of Notre Dame	Big East	25–4	15–3	5
Ohio State University	Big Ten	17–11	9–7	9
University of Oregon	Pacific-10	24–5	15–3	5
Pennsylvania State University	Big Ten	21–7	12–4	8
Rutgers University	Big East	26–5	17–1	3
Santa Clara University	West Coast	22–6	11–3	13
Stanford University	Pacific-10	18–11	14–4	7
University of Texas at Austin	Big 12	16–11	10–6	12
University of Virginia	Atlantic Coast	20–8	12–4	9
Virginia Tech	Atlantic 10	26–2	15–1	4
Xavier University	Atlantic 10	23–8	11–5	8

== Bids by conference ==
Thirty conferences earned an automatic bid. In seventeen cases, the automatic bid was the only representative from the conference. Thirty-four additional at-large teams were selected from thirteen of the conferences.

Bids	Conference	Teams
8	Southeastern	Tennessee, Alabama, Auburn, Florida, Georgia, Kentucky, LSU, Mississippi St.
5	Atlantic Coast	Clemson, Duke, North Carolina, North Carolina St., Virginia
5	Big 12	Texas Tech, Iowa St., Kansas, Nebraska, Texas
4	Big East	Connecticut, Boston College, Notre Dame, Rutgers
4	Big Ten	Purdue, Illinois, Ohio St., Penn St.
4	Conference USA	Tulane, Cincinnati, Louisville, Marquette
4	Pacific-10	UCLA, Arizona, Oregon, Stanford
3	Atlantic 10	St. Joseph's, Virginia Tech, Xavier
2	America East	Northeastern, Maine
2	Missouri Valley	Evansville, Missouri St.
2	Sun Belt	Louisiana Tech, FIU
2	West Coast	St. Mary's, Santa Clara
2	Western Athletic	SMU, Colorado St.
1	Big Sky	Cal St. Northridge
1	Big South	Liberty
1	Big West	UC Santa Barb.
1	Colonial	Old Dominion
1	Ivy	Dartmouth
1	Metro Atlantic	St. Peter's
1	Mid-American	Toledo
1	Mid-Continent	Oral Roberts
1	Mid-Eastern	Florida A&M
1	Midwestern Collegiate	Green Bay
1	Northeast	St. Francis (PA)
1	Ohio Valley	Tennessee Tech
1	Patriot	Holy Cross
1	Southern	Appalachian St.
1	Southland	Stephen F. Austin
1	Southwestern	Grambling
1	Trans America	UCF

== 1999 NCAA tournament schedule and venues ==
1999 NCAA first and second round venues – Fri/Sun (pink) and Sat/Mon (green)
1999 NCAA regionals (blue) and Final Four (red)

In 1999, the field remained at 64 teams. The teams were seeded, and assigned to four geographic regions, with seeds 1-16 in each region. In Round 1, seeds 1 and 16 faced each other, as well as seeds 2 and 15, seeds 3 and 14, seeds 4 and 13, seeds 5 and 12, seeds 6 and 11, seeds 7 and 10, and seeds 8 and 9. In the first two rounds, the top four seeds were given the opportunity to host the first-round game. In all cases, the higher seed accepted the opportunity.

First and Second rounds

The following lists the region, host school, venue and the sixteen first and second round locations:

- March 12 and 14
  - East Region
    - Old Dominion University Fieldhouse, Norfolk, Virginia (Host: Old Dominion University)
  - Mideast Region
    - Littlejohn Coliseum, Clemson, South Carolina (Host: Clemson University)
    - Harry A. Gampel Pavilion, Storrs, Connecticut (Host: University of Connecticut)
    - Hilton Coliseum, Ames, Iowa (Host: Iowa State University)
  - Midwest Region
    - Carmichael Auditorium, Chapel Hill, North Carolina (Host: University of North Carolina at Chapel Hill)
    - Louis Brown Athletic Center, Piscataway, New Jersey (Host: Rutgers University)
  - West Region
    - Thomas Assembly Center, Ruston, Louisiana (Host: Louisiana Tech University)
    - Moby Arena, Fort Collins, Colorado (Host: Colorado State University)
- March 13 and 15
  - East Region
    - Thompson–Boling Arena, Knoxville, Tennessee (Host: University of Tennessee)
    - Cameron Indoor Stadium, Durham, North Carolina (Host: Duke University)
    - Cassell Coliseum, Blacksburg, Virginia (Host: Virginia Tech)
  - Mideast Region
    - Stegeman Coliseum, Athens, Georgia (Host: University of Georgia)
  - Midwest Region
    - Mackey Arena, West Lafayette, Indiana (Host: Purdue University)
    - Lubbock Municipal Coliseum, Lubbock, Texas (Host: Texas Tech University)
  - West Region
    - Pete Maravich Assembly Center, Baton Rouge, Louisiana (Host: Louisiana State University)
    - Pauley Pavilion, Los Angeles, California (Host: University of California, Los Angeles)

Regional semifinals and finals

The Regionals, named for the general location, were held from March 20 to March 22 at these sites:

- March 20 and 22
  - Midwest Regional, Redbird Arena, Normal, Illinois (Host: Illinois State University)
  - West Regional, Los Angeles Memorial Sports Arena, Los Angeles, California (Host: University of Southern California)
  - Mideast Regional, Shoemaker Center, Cincinnati, Ohio (Host: University of Cincinnati)
  - East Regional, Greensboro Coliseum Complex, Greensboro, North Carolina

Each regional winner advanced to the Final Four held March 26 and March 28 in San Jose, California at the San Jose Arena

== Bids by state ==
The sixty-four teams came from thirty-one states. California had the most teams with six bids. Nineteen states did not have any teams receiving bids.

NCAA Women's basketball Tournament invitations by state 1999

Bids	State	Teams
6	California	Cal St. Northridge, St. Mary's, UC Santa Barb., UCLA, Santa Clara, Stanford
4	Florida	Florida A&M, UCF, FIU, Florida
4	Louisiana	Grambling, Louisiana Tech, Tulane, LSU
4	North Carolina	Appalachian St., Duke, North Carolina, North Carolina St.
4	Ohio	Toledo, Cincinnati, Ohio St., Xavier
4	Texas	SMU, Stephen F. Austin, Texas Tech, Texas
4	Virginia	Liberty, Old Dominion, Virginia, Virginia Tech
3	Indiana	Evansville, Purdue, Notre Dame
3	Massachusetts	Holy Cross, Northeastern, Boston College
2	Alabama	Alabama, Auburn
2	Kentucky	Kentucky, Louisville
2	New Jersey	St. Peter's, Rutgers
3	Pennsylvania	St. Joseph's, Penn St., St Francis
2	Tennessee	Tennessee, Tennessee Tech
2	Wisconsin	Green Bay, Marquette
1	Arizona	Arizona
1	Colorado	Colorado St.
1	Connecticut	Connecticut
1	Georgia	Georgia
1	Illinois	Illinois
1	Iowa	Iowa St.
1	Kansas	Kansas
1	Maine	Maine
1	Mississippi	Mississippi St.
1	Missouri	Missouri St.
1	Nebraska	Nebraska
1	New Hampshire	Dartmouth
1	Oklahoma	Oral Roberts
1	Oregon	Oregon
1	South Carolina	Clemson

== Brackets ==
Data source

* – Denotes overtime period

=== East Region – Greensboro, North Carolina ===
First round March 12 and 13
1	Tennessee	113
16	Appalachian State	54
Knoxville, Tennessee – Sat/Mon
8	Boston College	72
9	Ohio State	59
5	Auburn	69
12	Texas	61
Blacksburg, Virginia – Sat/Mon
4	Virginia Tech	73
13	St. Peter's	48
6	Tulane	72
11	Saint Joseph's	83
Durham, North Carolina – Sat/Mon
3	Duke	79
14	Holy Cross	51
7	Stanford	58
10	Maine	60
Norfolk, Virginia – Fri/Sun
2	Old Dominion	74
15	Tennessee Tech	48

Second round March 14 and 15
1	Tennessee	89
8	Boston College	62
5	Auburn	61
4	Virginia Tech	76
11	Saint Joseph's	60
3	Duke	66
10	Maine	62
2	Old Dominion	72

Regional semifinals March 20
1	Tennessee	68
4	Virginia Tech	52
3	Duke	76
2	Old Dominion	63

Regional finals March 22
1	Tennessee	63
3	Duke	69

=== Mideast Region – Cincinnati ===
First round March 12 and 13
1	Connecticut	97
16	Saint Francis	46
Storrs, Connecticut – Fri/Sun
8	Xavier	85
9	Florida International	71
5	Oregon	65
12	Cincinnati	56
Ames, Iowa – Fri/Sun
4	Iowa State	74
13	Santa Clara	61
6	Toledo	76
11	SMU	91
Athens, Georgia – Sat/Mon
3	Georgia	73
14	Liberty	52
7	Illinois	69
10	Louisville	67
Clemson, South Carolina – Fri/Sun
2	Clemson	76
15	Florida A&M	45

Second round March 14 and 15
1	Connecticut	86
8	Xavier	84
5	Oregon	70
4	Iowa State	85
11	SMU	55
3	Georgia	68
7	Illinois	51
2	Clemson	63

Regional semifinals March 20
1	Connecticut	58
4	Iowa State	64
3	Georgia	67
2	Clemson	54

Regional finals March 22
4	Iowa State	71
3	Georgia	89

=== Midwest Region – Normal, Illinois ===
First round March 12 and 13
1	Purdue	68
16	Oral Roberts	48
West Lafayette, Indiana – Sat/Mon
8	Marquette	58
9	Kansas	64
5	Alabama	80
12	Grambling State	68
Chapel Hill, North Carolina – Fri/Sun
4	North Carolina	64
13	Northeastern	55
6	Arizona	87*
11	Florida	84
Piscataway, New Jersey – Fri/Sun
3	Rutgers	84
14	Dartmouth	70
7	Mississippi State	57
10	NC State	76
Lubbock, Texas – Sat/Mon
2	Texas Tech	80
15	Stephen F. Austin	54

Second round March 14 and 15
1	Purdue	55
9	Kansas	41
5	Alabama	56
4	North Carolina	70
6	Arizona	47
3	Rutgers	90
10	NC State	78
2	Texas Tech	85

Regional semifinals March 20
1	Purdue	82
4	North Carolina	59
3	Rutgers	53
2	Texas Tech	42

Regional finals March 22
1	Purdue	75
3	Rutgers	62

=== West Region – Los Angeles ===
First round March 12 and 13
1	Louisiana Tech	90
16	UCF	48
Ruston, Louisiana – Fri/Sun
8	Penn State	82
9	Virginia	69
5	Notre Dame	61
12	St. Mary's (CA)	57
Baton Rouge, Louisiana – Sat/Mon
4	LSU	78
13	Evansville	69
6	Kentucky	98
11	Nebraska	92
Los Angeles California – Sat/Mon
3	UCLA	76
14	Green Bay	69
7	SW Missouri State	72
10	UC Santa Barbara	70
Fort Collins, Colorado – Fri/Sun
2	Colorado State	71
15	Cal State Northridge	59

Second round March 14 and 15
1	Louisiana Tech	79
8	Penn State	62
5	Notre Dame	64
4	LSU	74
6	Kentucky	63
3	UCLA	87
7	SW Missouri State	70
2	Colorado State	86

Regional semifinals March 20
1	Louisiana Tech	73
4	LSU	52
3	UCLA	77
2	Colorado State	68

Regional finals March 22
1	Louisiana Tech	88
3	UCLA	62

=== Final Four – San Jose, California ===
National semifinals March 26
E3	Duke	81
ME3	Georgia	69
MW1	Purdue	77
W1	Louisiana Tech	63

National championship March 28
E3	Duke	45
MW1	Purdue	62

E-East; ME-Mideast; MW-Midwest; W-West.

== Record by conference ==
Fourteen conferences had more than one bid, or at least one win in NCAA Tournament play:

Conference	# of Bids	Record	Win %	Round of 32	Sweet Sixteen	Elite Eight	Final Four	Championship Game
Southeastern	8	12–8	.600	6	3	2	1	–
Atlantic Coast	5	10–5	.667	4	3	1	1	1
Big 12	5	6–5	.545	3	2	1	–	–
Big Ten	4	8–3	.727	3	1	1	1	1
Big East	4	7–4	.636	4	2	1	–	–
Pacific-10	4	5–4	.556	3	1	1	–	–
Conference USA	4	0–4	–	–	–	–	–	–
Atlantic 10	3	4–3	.571	3	1	–	–	–
Sun Belt	2	4–2	.667	1	1	1	1	–
Western Athletic	2	3–2	.600	2	1	–	–	–
America East	2	1–2	.333	1	–	–	–	–
Missouri Valley	2	1–2	.333	1	–	–	–	–
West Coast	2	0–2	–	–	–	–	–	–
Colonial	1	2–1	.667	1	1	–	–	–

Sixteen conferences went 0-1: Big Sky Conference, Big South Conference, Big West Conference, Ivy League, MAAC, MAC, Mid-Continent, MEAC, Midwestern Collegiate, Northeast Conference, Ohio Valley Conference, Patriot League, Southern Conference, Southland, SWAC, and Trans America

== All-Tournament team ==
- Ukari Figgs, Purdue
- Stephanie White-McCarty, Purdue
- Katie Douglas, Purdue
- Michele VanGorp, Duke
- Nicole Erickson, Duke

== Game officials ==
- Scott Yarbrough (semifinal)
- Kim Balque(semifinal)
- Dennis DeMayo (semifinal)
- Sally Bell (semifinal)
- Stan Gaxiola (semifinal)
- Lisa Mattingly (semifinal)
- Melissa Barlow (final)
- Bob Trammell (final)
- Teresa Dahlem (final)

== See also ==
- 1999 NCAA Division I men's basketball tournament
- 1999 NCAA Division II women's basketball tournament
- 1999 NCAA Division III women's basketball tournament
- 1999 NAIA Division I women's basketball tournament
- 1999 NAIA Division II women's basketball tournament
