= 2022–23 Oral Roberts Golden Eagles women's basketball team =

Intercollegiate basketball season

2022–23 Oral Roberts Golden Eagles women's basketball
- Conference: Summit League
- Record: 12–19 (8–10 The Summit)
- Head coach: Kelsi Musick (1st season)
- Assistant coaches: Cophie Anderson; Bill Annan; Hayden Priddy
- Home arena: Mabee Center

2022–23 Summit League women's basketball standings
	Conf.				Overall
Team	W		L	PCT	W		L	PCT
South Dakota State †	18	–	0	1.000	29	–	6	.829
North Dakota State	12	–	6	.667	18	–	12	.600
North Dakota	11	–	7	.611	19	–	13	.594
South Dakota	10	–	8	.556	14	–	16	.467
Oral Roberts	8	–	10	.444	12	–	19	.387
Omaha	8	–	10	.444	15	–	17	.469
Denver	8	–	10	.444	12	–	18	.400
St. Thomas*	7	–	11	.389	13	–	17	.433
Western Illinois	5	–	13	.278	10	–	20	.333
Kansas City	3	–	15	.167	9	–	23	.281
† 2023 Summit League Tournament winner * Ineligible for the 2023 NCAA tournament due to transition from Division III; As of March 19, 2023

The 2022–23 Oral Roberts Golden Eagles women's basketball team represented Oral Roberts University in the 2022–23 NCAA Division I women's basketball season. The Golden Eagles, led by first year head coach Kelsi Musick, competed in the Summit League. They played home games in Mabee Center in Tulsa, Oklahoma.

== Previous season ==
The Golden Eagles went 16–15 overall and 10–8 in conference play, finishing fourth.

Oral Roberts played North Dakota in the quarterfinals won 61–54. At the semifinals played the regular season champion South Dakota State and lost 53–72. On March 30, 2022, Misti Cussen and the team parted ways after 10 seasons. On April 21, 2022, Golden Eagles appointed new head coach Kelsi Musick, who led the Division II member Southwestern Oklahoma State team the past 13 seasons.

== Offseason ==
After coach Cussen left the team, her assistants also left the Golden Eagles. Assistant coach Jeff Zinn replaced Kelsi Musick at the SWOSU. Assistant Lee Mayberry became head coach Oklahoma Class 3A Cascia Hall high school boys team.

=== Departures ===
Name	Pos.	Height	Year	Hometown	Reason for departure
Manaya Jones	C	6'2"	Graduate Student	Memphis, TN	Completed college eligibility
Regan Schumacher	C	6'2"	Graduate Student	Olathe, KS	Completed college eligibility
Keni Jo Lippe	G	5'9"	Graduate Student	Adair, OK	Completed college eligibility
Tyaija Coleman	G	5'8"	Junior	Arlington, TX	Transferred to Mid-America Christian University (NAIA)
Tierney Coleman	G	5'8"	Sophomore	Arlington, TX	Transferred to Sam Houston State University
Faith Paramore	F	6'0"	Sophomore	Haven, KS	Transferred to Emporia State University (D-II)
Katie Scott	C	6'3"	Junior	Carl Junction, MO	Transferred to Point Loma Nazarene University (D-II)
Sinetra Jones	F	6'3"	Sophomore	Memphis, TN	Transferred to University of Arkansas–Fort Smith (D-II)
Hannah Giddey	F	6'2"	Junior	Melbourne, Australia	Transferred to Southern Nazarene University (D-II)
Camryn Hill	F	6'0"	Junior	Dallas, TX	Transferred to Hampton University

=== Additions ===
Name	Number	Pos.	Height	Year	Hometown	Previous School
Sara Rodrigues	30	G-F	6'3"	Senior	São Paulo, Brazil	Oklahoma State University
Ruthie Udoumoh	22	F	6'1"	Junior	Broken Arrow, OK	Oklahoma State University
Lauren Ramey	20	G	6'1"	Graduate Student	Kiefer, OK	Southwestern Oklahoma State University (D-II)

=== 2022 recruiting class ===
College recruiting information
Name	Hometown	School	Height	Weight	Commit date
Maggie Sockey; G	Red Oak, OK	Crowder High School	5 ft 8 in (1.73 m)	N/A	November 11th, 2021
Maggie Sockey; G	Recruit ratings: No ratings found				
Overall recruit ranking:
Note: In many cases, Scout, Rivals, 247Sports, On3, and ESPN may conflict in their listings of height and weight.; In these cases, the average was taken. ESPN grades are on a 100-point scale.; Sources:

=== 2023 recruiting class ===
College recruiting information (2023)
Name	Hometown	School	Height	Weight	Commit date
Annyka Hellendrung; G	Milwaukee, WI	Waukesha West High School	5 ft 9 in (1.75 m)	N/A	August 4th, 2022
Annyka Hellendrung; G	Recruit ratings: No ratings found				
Gentry Baldwin; G	Bixby, OK	Bixby High School	5 ft 5 in (1.65 m)	N/A	November 10th, 2022
Gentry Baldwin; G	Recruit ratings: No ratings found				
Emily Robinson; F	Bokchito, OK	Caddo High School	5 ft 10 in (1.78 m)	N/A	November 10th, 2022
Emily Robinson; F	Recruit ratings: No ratings found				
Overall recruit ranking:
Note: In many cases, Scout, Rivals, 247Sports, On3, and ESPN may conflict in their listings of height and weight.; In these cases, the average was taken. ESPN grades are on a 100-point scale.; Sources:

== Preseason ==
=== Summit League Preseason poll ===
The Summit League Preseason poll and other preseason awards was released on October 11, 2022, with the Golden Eagles selected to finish in third place in the Summit League.

Coaches Poll
Predicted finish	Team	Votes (1st place)
1	South Dakota State	746 (36)
2	South Dakota	676 (4)
3	Oral Roberts	602
4	North Dakota	522
5	North Dakota State	475
6	Kansas City	388
7	Western Illinois	308
8	Denver	227
9	St. Thomas	211
10	Omaha	199

=== Preseason All-Summit teams ===
The Golden Eagles had one player selected to the preseason all-Summit teams.

First team

Tirzah Moore

== Roster ==
2022–23 Oral Roberts Golden Eagles women's basketball team
Players
Coaches

Pos.	#	Name	Height	Year	Previous school	Hometown
G	1	Maggie Sockey	5 ft 8 in (1.73 m)	Fr	Crowder HS	Red Oak, OK
G	2	Hannah Cooper	5 ft 7 in (1.7 m)	Sr	Andress HS; Western Colorado	El Paso, TX
G	3	Nena Taylor	5 ft 9 in (1.75 m)	RS Jr	Parsons HS	Parsons, KS
F	4	Elayna Whitley	6 ft 0 in (1.83 m)	RS Fr	Loudoun County HS; Delaware State	Leesburg, VA
G	11	Ariel Walker	5 ft 6 in (1.68 m)	GS	Ozark HS; Allen CC	Ozark, AR
F	12	Makenna Winans	6 ft 0 in (1.83 m)	Jr	Parkersburg South HS; Charleston Southern	Parkersburg, WV
G	14	Delaney Nix	5 ft 8 in (1.73 m)	GS	Tahlequah HS; West Texas A&M	Tahlequah, OK
G	20	Lauren Ramey	6 ft 1 in (1.85 m)	GS	Kiefer HS; SWOSU	Kiefer, OK
F	22	Ruthie Udoumoh	6 ft 1 in (1.85 m)	Jr	Victory Christian; Oklahoma State	Broken Arrow, OK
G	23	Talia Pogi	5 ft 9 in (1.75 m)	Fr	Mustang HS	Mustang, OK
G	30	Sara Rodrigues	6 ft 3 in (1.91 m)	Sr	Colégio Integrado de Guarulhos; Oklahoma State	São Paulo, Brazil
F	32	Tirzah Moore	6 ft 0 in (1.83 m)	So	Jones HS	Oklahoma City, OK
C	33	Elena Lijo	6 ft 5 in (1.96 m)	Fr	IES Monelos Ano Galen; Ensino Lugo CB	La Coruña, Spain
F	35	Trinity Moore	6 ft 0 in (1.83 m)	So	Jones HS	Oklahoma City, OK

Head coach

- Kelsi Musick (Cameron)

Assistant coach(es)

- Cophie Anderson (Fresno State)
- Bill Annan (Kansas State)
- Hayden Priddy (Southwestern Oklahoma State)

Legend

- (C) Team captain
- (S) Suspended
- (I) Ineligible
- (W) Walk-on
- Injured
- Current redshirt

Roster

== Schedule ==
Date time, TV	Rank^{#}	Opponent^{#}	Result	Record	High points	High rebounds	High assists	Site (attendance) city, state
Exhibition
November 1, 2022*; 11:00 am		Oklahoma Christian; Best Field Trip Ever	W 90–63	–	19 – Ti. Moore	11 – Ti. Moore	6 – Cooper	Mabee Center (3,294); Tulsa, OK
November 4, 2022*; 7:00 pm		Rogers State	W 96–74	–	22 – Ti. Moore	12 – Ti. Moore	4 – Tied	Mabee Center (2,397); Tulsa, OK
Non-conference regular season (3-8)
November 7, 2022*; 4:00 pm, ESPN+		at No. 15 Oklahoma	L 94–105	0–1	25 – Ti. Moore	17 – Ti. Moore	6 – Cooper	Lloyd Noble Center (2,017); Norman, OK
November 11, 2022*; 7:30 pm, The Mtn.		at UNLV	L 84–100	0–2	39 – Cooper	10 – Ti. Moore	5 – Udoumoh	Cox Pavilion (684); Paradise, NV
November 14, 2022*; 6:30 pm, ESPN+		at Oklahoma State	L 66–103	0–3	17 – Walker	6 – Tied	4 – Cooper	Gallagher-Iba Arena (1,578); Stillwater, OK
November 16, 2022*; 7:00 pm, ORUSN		Wichita State	L 67–89	0–4	19 – Cooper	14 – Ti. Moore	6 – Udoumoh	Mabee Center (1,888); Tulsa, OK
November 20, 2022*; 1:00 pm, ESPN+		at Tulsa; Rivalry	L 77–92	0–5	21 – Nix	11 – Ti. Moore	5 – Cooper	Reynolds Center (1,362); Tulsa, OK
November 23, 2022*; 1:00 pm, ESPN+		at Little Rock	W 74–62	1–5	22 – Cooper	13 – Rodrigues	8 – Cooper	Jack Stephens Center (1,531); Little Rock, AR
November 26, 2022*; 2:00 pm, ORUSN		SMU	L 55–72	1–6	16 – Ti. Moore	18 – Ti. Moore	3 – Nix	Mabee Center (2,072); Tulsa, OK
November 28, 2022*; 7:00 pm, ORUSN		Central Christian	W 100–40	2–6	23 – Cooper	10 – Ti. Moore	6 – Cooper	Mabee Center (1,685); Tulsa, OK
December 4, 2022*; 2:00 pm, SEC Network+		at Arkansas	L 58–92	2–7	16 – Ti. Moore	11 – Ti. Moore	4 – Cooper	Bud Walton Arena (2,947); Fayetteville, AR
December 11, 2022*; 2:00 pm, ORUSN		Abilene Christian	W 87–81	3–7	26 – Cooper	8 – Ti. Moore	9 – Cooper	Mabee Center (1,473); Tulsa, OK
December 14, 2022*; 7:00 pm, ESPN+		at Texas Tech	L 68–82	3–8	30 – Cooper	6 – Cooper	3 – Cooper	United Supermarkets Arena (3,352); Lubbock, TX
Summit League regular season (8-10)
December 19, 2022; 7:00 pm, ESPN+		at South Dakota State	L 80–83	3–9 (0–1)	25 – Cooper	9 – Winans	5 – Nix	Frost Arena (1,281); Brookings, SD
December 21, 2022; 7:00 pm		at South Dakota	L 57–101	3–10 (0–2)	16 – Cooper	6 – Walker	4 – Walker	Sanford Coyote Sports Center (1,410); Vermillion, SD
December 29, 2022; 7:00 pm, ORUSN		Omaha	W 75–63	4–10 (1–2)	19 – Cooper	12 – Udoumoh	4 – Udoumoh	Mabee Center (1,909); Tulsa, OK
December 31, 2022; 2:00 pm, ORUSN		Denver	W 88–70	5–10 (2–2)	23 – Walker	10 – Ti. Moore	6 – Cooper	Mabee Center (1,774); Tulsa, OK
January 7, 2023; 2:00 pm		at Kansas City	L 54–65	5–11 (2–3)	12 – Tied	6 – Tied	4 – Cooper	Municipal Auditorium (444); Kansas City, MO
January 12, 2023; 6:00 pm		at Western Illinois	W 94–90	6–11 (3–3)	23 – Walker	20 – Ti. Moore	6 – Udoumoh	Western Hall (367); Macomb, IL
January 14, 2023; 1:00 pm		at St. Thomas	L 75–76	6–12 (3–4)	33 – Cooper	11 – Udoumoh	4 – Cooper	Schoenecker Arena (361); St. Paul, MN
January 19, 2023; 7:00 pm, ORUSN		North Dakota State	W 75–53	7–12 (4–4)	30 – Ti. Moore	15 – Ti. Moore	4 – Tied	Mabee Center (1,574); Tulsa, OK
January 21, 2023; 2:00 pm, ORUSN		North Dakota	W 96–91	8–12 (5–4)	21 – Nix	14 – Udoumoh	11 – Udoumoh	Mabee Center (2,008); Tulsa, OK
January 26, 2023; 7:00 pm		at Denver	W 93–83	9–12 (6–4)	28 – Cooper	11 – Udoumoh	3 – Tied	Hamilton Gymnasium (251); Denver, CO
January 28, 2023; 2:05 pm		at Omaha	W 94–90 ^{OT}	10–12 (7–4)	25 – Cooper	12 – Ti. Moore	6 – Cooper	Baxter Arena (672); Omaha, NE
February 4, 2023; 2:00 pm, ORUSN		Kansas City	W 86–68	11–12 (8–4)	25 – Cooper	12 – Tied	10 – Walker	Mabee Center (1,759); Tulsa, OK
February 9, 2023; 7:00 pm, ORUSN		St. Thomas	L 70–75	11–13 (8–5)	21 – Cooper	13 – Ti. Moore	2 – Tied	Mabee Center (1,908); Tulsa, OK
February 11, 2023; 2:00 pm, ORUSN		Western Illinois	L 85–91	11–14 (8–6)	24 – Nix	13 – Ramey	11 – Cooper	Mabee Center (1,828); Tulsa, OK
February 16, 2023; 7:05 pm, Midco Sports+		at North Dakota	L 100–108	11–15 (8–7)	32 – Cooper	10 – Cooper	3 – Tied	Betty Engelstad Sioux Center (1,371); Grand Forks, ND
February 18, 2023; 1:00 pm		at North Dakota State	L 86–103	11–16 (8–8)	24 – Walker	10 – Ti. Moore	6 – Cooper	Scheels Center (782); Fargo, ND
February 23, 2023; 7:00 pm, ORUSN		South Dakota	L 63–77	11–17 (8–9)	27 – Ti. Moore	12 – Ti. Moore	4 – Nix	Mabee Center (1,529); Tulsa, OK
February 25, 2023; 2:00 pm, ORUSN		South Dakota State	L 67–92	11–18 (8–10)	23 – Cooper	7 – Cooper	3 – Tied	Mabee Center (2,275); Tulsa, OK
Summit League Women's Tournament (1-1)
March 5, 2023; 12:30 pm, ESPN+	(5)	vs. (4) South Dakota; Quarterfinals	W 92–69	12–18	24 – Cooper	8 – Ti. Moore	7 – Cooper	Denny Sanford Premier Center; Sioux Falls, SD
March 6, 2023; 12:30 pm, ESPN+ / Cox Cable 3	(5)	vs. (1) South Dakota State; Semifinals	L 60–87	12–19	14 – Cooper	4 – Tied	4 – Cooper	Denny Sanford Premier Center; Sioux Falls, SD
*Non-conference game. ^{#}Rankings from AP Poll. (#) Tournament seedings in parentheses. All times are in Central Time.

== Awards and honors ==
Weekly honors
Honors	Player	Position	Date Awarded	Ref.
Summit League Player of the Week	Hannah Cooper	G	November 14, 2022	
Summit League Player of the Week	Hannah Cooper	G	December 12, 2022	
Summit League Player of the Week	Hannah Cooper	G	December 19, 2022	
Summit League Player of the Week	Tirzah Moore	F	January 23, 2023	
Summit League Player of the Week	Hannah Cooper	G	January 30, 2023	
