= 2000 NAIA Division II men's basketball tournament =

- Teams: 32
- Finals site: Keeter Gymnasium; Point Lookout, Missouri
- Champions: Embry–Riddle Eagles (1st title, 1st title game, 1st Fab Four)
- Runner-up: College of the Ozarks Bobcats (1st title game, 1st Fab Four)
- Semifinalists: Huntington Foresters (1st Fab Four); Siena Heights Saints (2nd Fab Four)
- Charles Stevenson Hustle Award: Kyle Mas (College of the Ozarks)
- Chuck Taylor MVP: Jason Cruse (Embry–Riddle)
- Top scorer: Steve Smith (Saint Francis (IN)) (98 points)

The 2000 NAIA Division II men's basketball tournament was the tournament held by the NAIA to determine the national champion of men's college basketball among its Division II members in the United States and Canada for the 1999–2000 basketball season.

Embry–Riddle (FL) defeated unseeded hosts College of the Ozarks in the championship game, 75–63, to claim the Eagles' first NAIA national title.

The tournament was played at Keeter Gymnasium on the campus of the College of the Ozarks in Point Lookout, Missouri.

== Qualification ==
The tournament field remained fixed at thirty-two teams, and the top sixteen teams were seeded.

The tournament continued to utilize a single-elimination format.

== Bracket ==
First round
1	MidAmerica Nazarene	93
Martin Luther	82
Berea	71
16	Grand View	84
9	Concordia Oregon	85
Bethany (KS)	67
Dominican (NY)	58
8	Embry–Riddle (FL)	74
5	Siena Heights	99
Montreat	80
Menlo	64
12	Mount Vernon Nazarene	91
13	Newman	82
Daemen	76
Midland Lutheran	75
4	Saint Francis (IN)	89
3	Huron	94
Husson	78
College of the Ozarks	88
14	Northwestern (IA)	79
11	Oregon Tech	78
Bryan (TN)	50
Green Mountain	74
6	Briar Cliff	106
7	Saint Ambrose	72
Cal State Hayward	75
St. Thomas Aquinas	55
10	Dickinson State	56
15	Robert Morris	74
Lindenwood	89
Nyack	64
2	Huntington (IN)	99

Second round
1	MidAmerica Nazarene	68
16	Grand View	71
9	Concordia Oregon	77
8	Embry–Riddle (FL)	80
5	Siena Heights	118
12	Mount Vernon Nazarene	93
13	Newman	94
4	Saint Francis (IN)	106
3	Huron	82
College of the Ozarks	93
11	Oregon Tech	96
6	Briar Cliff	85
Cal State Hayward	50
10	Dickinson State	67
Lindenwood	49
2	Huntington (IN)	65

Quarterfinals
16	Grand View	52
8	Embry–Riddle (FL)	75
5	Siena Heights	97
4	Saint Francis (IN)	88
College of the Ozarks	84
11	Oregon Tech	54
10	Dickinson State	47
2	Huntington (IN)	60

Semifinals
8	Embry–Riddle (FL)	92
5	Siena Heights	80
College of the Ozarks	83
2	Huntington (IN)	81

National championship
8	Embry–Riddle (FL)	75
College of the Ozarks	63

== See also ==
- 2000 NAIA Division I men's basketball tournament
- 2000 NCAA Division I men's basketball tournament
- 2000 NCAA Division II men's basketball tournament
- 2000 NCAA Division III men's basketball tournament
- 2000 NAIA Division II women's basketball tournament
