= 2023 Summit League women's basketball tournament =

- Classification: Division I
- Season: 2022–23
- Teams: 10
- Site: Denny Sanford Premier Center; Sioux Falls, South Dakota
- Champions: South Dakota State (10th title)
- Winning coach: Aaron Johnston (10th title)
- MVP: Haleigh Timmer (South Dakota State)
- Television: ESPN+, ESPNU

2022–23 Summit League women's basketball standings
	Conf.				Overall
Team	W		L	PCT	W		L	PCT
South Dakota State †	18	–	0	1.000	29	–	6	.829
North Dakota State	12	–	6	.667	18	–	12	.600
North Dakota	11	–	7	.611	19	–	13	.594
South Dakota	10	–	8	.556	14	–	16	.467
Oral Roberts	8	–	10	.444	12	–	19	.387
Omaha	8	–	10	.444	15	–	17	.469
Denver	8	–	10	.444	12	–	18	.400
St. Thomas*	7	–	11	.389	13	–	17	.433
Western Illinois	5	–	13	.278	10	–	20	.333
Kansas City	3	–	15	.167	9	–	23	.281
† 2023 Summit League Tournament winner * Ineligible for the 2023 NCAA tournament due to transition from Division III; As of March 19, 2023

The 2023 Summit League women's basketball Tournament was the postseason women's basketball tournament for the Summit League for the 2022-23 season. All tournament games were played at the Denny Sanford Premier Center in Sioux Falls, South Dakota, from March 3–7, 2023.

== Seeds ==
All ten conference teams participated in the tournament following a change announced before the season began. It was the first year that St. Thomas participated in a Division I conference tournament in any sport. Teams were seeded by regular-season conference record, with a tiebreaker system to seed teams with identical conference records. The tiebreakers operated in the following order:

1. Head-to-head record
2. Record against the top-seeded team not involved in the tie, going down through the standings until the tie is broken

Seed	School	Conf. record	Tiebreaker(s)
1	South Dakota State	18–0	
2	North Dakota State	12–6	
3	North Dakota	11–7	
4	South Dakota	10–8	
5	Oral Roberts	8–10	4–0 vs Denver, Omaha
6	Omaha	8–10	2–2 vs Denver, Oral Roberts
7	Denver	8–10	0–4 vs Omaha, Oral Roberts
8	St. Thomas	7–11	
9	Western Illinois	5–13	
10	Kansas City	3–15	

== Schedule and results ==
Game	Time	Matchup	Score	Television
First Round - Friday, March 3
1	12:30 pm	No. 8 St. Thomas vs. No. 9 Western Illinois	61–50	MidcoSN/ESPN+
2	3:00 pm	No. 7 Denver vs. No. 10 Kansas City	66–65	MidcoSN/ESPN+
Quarterfinals – Saturday, March 4
3	12:30 pm	No. 1 South Dakota State vs. No. 8 St. Thomas	87–59	MidcoSN/ESPN+
4	3:00 pm	No. 2 North Dakota State vs. No. 10 Kansas City	71–64	MidcoSN/ESPN+
Quarterfinals – Sunday, March 5
5	12:30 pm	No. 4 South Dakota vs. No. 5 Oral Roberts	92–69	MidcoSN/ESPN+
6	3:00 pm	No. 3 North Dakota vs. No. 6 Omaha	84–81	MidcoSN/ESPN+
Semifinals - Monday, March 6
7	12:30 pm	No. 1 South Dakota State vs. No. 5 Oral Roberts	87–60	MidcoSN/ESPN+
8	3:00 pm	No. 10 Kansas City vs. No. 6 Omaha	69–60	MidcoSN/ESPN+
Final – Tuesday, March 7
9	1:00 pm	No. 1 South Dakota State vs. No. 6 Omaha	93–51	ESPNU
*Game times in CST. Rankings denote tournament seed. Reference:

== Bracket ==
First Round; March 3 ESPN+
8	St. Thomas	61
9	Western Illinois	50
7	Denver	65
10	Kansas City	66

Quarterfinals; March 4 & 5 ESPN+
1	South Dakota State	87
8	St. Thomas	59
4	South Dakota	69
5	Oral Roberts	92
2	North Dakota State	64
10	Kansas City	71
3	North Dakota	81
6	Omaha	84

Semifinals; March 6 ESPN+
1	South Dakota State	87
5	Oral Roberts	60
10	Kansas City	60
6	Omaha	69

Championship; March 7 ESPNU
1	South Dakota State	93
6	Omaha	51

== All-Tournament Team ==
The following players were named to the All-Tournament team:

Player	School
Haleigh Timmer (MVP)	South Dakota State
Paige Meyer	South Dakota State
Myah Selland	South Dakota State
Elena Pilakouta	Omaha
Manna Mensah	Kansas City
