= 2022–23 North Dakota State Bison women's basketball team =

College women's basketball season

2022–23 North Dakota State Bison women's basketball

WNIT first round
- Conference: Summit League
- Record: 18–12 (12–6 Summit)
- Head coach: Jory Collins (4th season)
- Associate head coach: Dylan Geissert
- Assistant coaches: Jaime Adams; Michaela Crall
- Home arena: Scheels Center

2022–23 Summit League women's basketball standings
	Conf.				Overall
Team	W		L	PCT	W		L	PCT
South Dakota State †	18	–	0	1.000	29	–	6	.829
North Dakota State	12	–	6	.667	18	–	12	.600
North Dakota	11	–	7	.611	19	–	13	.594
South Dakota	10	–	8	.556	14	–	16	.467
Oral Roberts	8	–	10	.444	12	–	19	.387
Omaha	8	–	10	.444	15	–	17	.469
Denver	8	–	10	.444	12	–	18	.400
St. Thomas*	7	–	11	.389	13	–	17	.433
Western Illinois	5	–	13	.278	10	–	20	.333
Kansas City	3	–	15	.167	9	–	23	.281
† 2023 Summit League Tournament winner * Ineligible for the 2023 NCAA tournament due to transition from Division III; As of March 19, 2023

The 2022–23 North Dakota State Bison women's basketball team represented North Dakota State University during the 2022–23 NCAA Division I women's basketball season. The Bison, led by fourth-year head coach Jory Collins, played their home games at the Scheels Center in Fargo, North Dakota as members of the Summit League. After the Bison's win over St. Thomas on February 23, the Bison clinched their highest Division I win count since 2008. The Bison clinched the second seed in the Summit League tournament, the highest mark in a conference tournament since their Division II days.

Their tournament run ended in the quarterfinals of the tournament when they lost to 10th-seeded Kansas City.

The Bison were automatically invited to the 2023 Women's National Invitation Tournament since Summit League regular-season champion South Dakota State made the NCAA tournament. Their postseason run ended in the WNIT first round when they lost to Oregon.

== Previous season ==
The Bison finished the 2021–22 season 11–18, 7–11 in Summit League play, to finish in sixth place. In the Summit League tournament, they lost to third-seeded Kansas City to be eliminated from the tournament.

== Offseason ==
=== Departures ===
Name	Number	Pos.	Height	Year	Hometown	Reason for departure
Reneya Hopkins	0	G	5' 6"	Senior	Midwest City, OK	Transferred to Texas A&M University–Texarkana (NAIA)
Kylie Strop	2	G	5' 7"	Sophomore	River Falls, WI	Transferred to Wisconsin–Eau Claire (Division III)
Kadie Deaton	3	G	5' 11"	Junior	Wausau, WI	Transferred to Pacific
Ellie Dague	4	G	5' 10"	Freshman	Henning, MN	Transferred to St. Thomas
Ryan Cobbins	5	G/F	6' 0"	Junior	Kansas City, KS	Transferred to Alabama
Abbey Kubas	22	F	5' 11"	Freshman	Dickinson, ND	Left team for personal reasons
Olivia Skibiel	23	G/F	6' 0"	Junior	Snohomish, WA	Transferred to Minnesota State–Moorhead (Division II)

=== Incoming transfers ===
Name	Number	Pos.	Height	Year	Hometown	Previous school
Abbie Draper	2	F	6' 2"	Sophomore	Waverly, IA	Bradley
Georgia Baldwin	4	F	6' 0"	Junior	Melbourne, Australia	Eastern Kentucky
Taylor Brown	14	F	6' 1"	Senior	Lakeville, MN	American

=== 2022 recruiting class ===
College recruiting information
Name	Hometown	School	Height	Weight	Commit date
Leah Mackenzie; G	Melbourne, Australia	Box Hill Senior Secondary College	5 ft 8 in (1.73 m)	N/A	
Leah Mackenzie; G	Recruit ratings: Scout: Rivals: 247Sports: ESPN: (0)				
Marwa Bedziri; F	Stockholm, Sweden	Fryshuset Gymnasium	6 ft 3 in (1.91 m)	N/A	
Marwa Bedziri; F	Recruit ratings: Scout: Rivals: 247Sports: ESPN: (0)				
Abby Graham; G	Portland, OR	St. Mary's Academy	5 ft 10 in (1.78 m)	N/A	
Abby Graham; G	Recruit ratings: Scout: Rivals: 247Sports: ESPN: (0)				
Elle Evans; G	Edwardsville, IL	Edwardsville High School	6 ft 3 in (1.91 m)	N/A	
Elle Evans; G	Recruit ratings: Scout: Rivals: 247Sports: ESPN: (0)				
Overall recruit ranking:
Note: In many cases, Scout, Rivals, 247Sports, On3, and ESPN may conflict in their listings of height and weight.; In these cases, the average was taken. ESPN grades are on a 100-point scale.; Sources: "2022 Team Ranking". Rivals.

== Roster ==
2022–23 North Dakota State Bison women's basketball team
Players
Coaches

Pos.	#	Name	Height	Year	Hometown
F	2	Abbie Draper	6 ft 2 in (1.88 m)	So	Waverly, IA
G	3	Leah Mackenzie	5 ft 8 in (1.73 m)	Fr	Melbourne, Australia
F	4	Georgia Baldwin	6 ft 0 in (1.83 m)	Jr	Melbourne, Australia
F	5	Marwa Bedziri	6 ft 3 in (1.91 m)	Fr	Stockholm, Sweden
G	10	Abby Graham	5 ft 10 in (1.78 m)	Fr	Portland, OR
G	11	Heaven Hamling	5 ft 8 in (1.73 m)	Sr	Grand Rapids, MN
G	13	Rachel Novak	5 ft 9 in (1.75 m)	Jr	Fort Collins, CO
F	14	Taylor Brown	6 ft 1 in (1.85 m)	GS	Lakeville, MN
F	15	Kristina Ekofo Yomane	6 ft 1 in (1.85 m)	Jr	Brussels, Belgium
F	20	Emily Behnke	6 ft 2 in (1.88 m)	Jr	Two Rivers, WI
G	21	Elle Evans	6 ft 3 in (1.91 m)	Fr	Edwardsville, IL
G	24	Abby Schulte	5 ft 10 in (1.78 m)	Jr	Maple Grove, MN
G	32	Sophie Olson	5 ft 11 in (1.8 m)	So	El Dorado Hills, CA
G	33	Katie Hildebrandt	6 ft 2 in (1.88 m)	So	McFarland, WI

Head coach

- Jory Collins (Emporia State)

Assistant coach(es)

- Dylan Geissert (Emporia State)
- Jaime Adams
- Michaela Crall (Wisconsin)

Legend

- (C) Team captain
- (S) Suspended
- (I) Ineligible
- (W) Walk-on
- Injured
- Current redshirt

Roster
Last update: September 17, 2022

== Schedule and results ==
Date time, TV	Rank^{#}	Opponent^{#}	Result	Record	High points	High rebounds	High assists	Site (attendance) city, state
Non-conference regular season
November 7, 2022*; 7:00 p.m., ESPN+		at Montana	W 65–63	1–0	19 – Hamling	9 – Behnke	6 – Hamling	Dahlberg Arena (1,891); Missoula, MT
November 14, 2022*; 7:00 p.m., WDAY Xtra/ESPN+		Valley City State	W 96–45	2–0	21 – Hamling	6 – tied	5 – Schulte	Scheels Center (365); Fargo, ND
November 17, 2022*; 7:00 p.m., ABC ND/ESPN+		Minnesota	W 71–65	3–0	16 – Brown	10 – Brown	5 – Schulte	Scheels Center (1,759); Fargo, ND
November 22, 2022*; 7:00 p.m., WDAY Xtra/ESPN+		Northern Colorado	W 68–54	4–0	15 – Evans	6 – Hamling	6 – Hamling	Scheels Center (531); Fargo, ND
November 25, 2022*; 6:30 p.m.		vs. Boise State; Nugget Classic	W 68–53	5–0	23 – Hamling	4 – tied	3 – Hamling	Lawlor Events Center (826); Reno, NV
November 27, 2022*; 2:30 p.m.		at Nevada; Nugget Classic	W 73–68	6–0	39 – Hamling	7 – Brown	6 – Schulte	Lawlor Events Center (775); Reno, NV
December 1, 2022*; 6:00 p.m., ESPN+		at Eastern Michigan	L 55–73	6–1	14 – Evans	7 – tied	4 – Hamling	George Gervin GameAbove Center (1,821); Ypsilanti, MI
December 3, 2022*; 12:00 p.m., ESPN3		at Central Michigan	L 65–66	6–2	17 – Evans	10 – Behnke	5 – Evans	McGuirk Arena (1,078); Mount Pleasant, MI
December 6, 2022*; 5:00 p.m., ESPN+		at Northern Iowa	L 70–79	6–3	16 – Behnke	10 – Behnke	3 – tied	McLeod Center (1,852); Cedar Falls, IA
December 10, 2022*; 1:00 p.m., ESPN+		at Green Bay	L 52–70	6–4	13 – Evans	7 – Evans	4 – Hamling	Kress Events Center (1,674); Green Bay, WI
December 14, 2022*; 6:00 p.m.		at Mayville State; Rescheduled from November 10	Cancelled due to inclement weather					Lewy Lee Fieldhouse; Mayville, ND
Summit League regular season
December 19, 2022; 7:00 p.m., WDAY Xtra/ESPN+		Western Illinois	W 84–60	7–4 (1–0)	13 – Hamling	8 – Ekofo Yomane	8 – Schulte	Scheels Center (276); Fargo, ND
December 21, 2022; 7:00 p.m., WDAY Xtra/ESPN+		St. Thomas	W 74–56	8–4 (2–0)	17 – Hamling	8 – Benhke	6 – Hamling	Scheels Center (211); Fargo, ND
December 31, 2022; 1:00 p.m., WDAY Xtra/ESPN+		North Dakota	W 81–76	9–4 (3–0)	28 – Hamling	9 – Behnke	6 – Hamling	Scheels Center (1,691); Fargo, ND
January 5, 2023; 7:00 p.m.		at South Dakota State	L 63–94	9–5 (3–1)	15 – Graham	7 – Brown	5 – Schulte	Frost Arena (1,341); Brookings, SD
January 7, 2023; 1:00 p.m., MidcoSN+		at South Dakota	W 79–76	10–5 (4–1)	22 – Hamling	8 – Behnke	6 – Hamling	Sanford Coyote Sports Center (1,969); Vermillion, SD
January 12, 2023; 7:00 p.m., WDAY Xtra/ESPN+		Denver	W 71–43	11–5 (5–1)	22 – Graham	12 – Behnke	4 – Hamling	Scheels Center (548); Fargo, ND
January 14, 2023; 1:00 p.m., WDAY Xtra/ESPN+		Omaha	W 83–71	12–5 (6–1)	26 – Hamling	6 – Hamling	6 – Hamling	Scheels Center (766); Fargo, ND
January 19, 2023; 7:00 p.m.		at Oral Roberts	L 53–75	12–6 (6–2)	14 – Evans	7 – Behnke	3 – Hamling	Mabee Center (1,574); Tulsa, OK
January 21, 2023; 2:00 p.m.		at Kansas City	W 75–66	13–6 (7–2)	23 – Evans	11 – Behnke	4 – Hamling	Swinney Recreation Center (480); Kansas City, MO
January 28, 2023; 1:05 p.m., MidcoSN/ESPN3		at North Dakota	L 73–82	13–7 (7–3)	28 – Hamling	8 – Evans	2 – Hamling	Betty Engelstad Sioux Center (2,116); Grand Forks, ND
February 2, 2023; 7:00 p.m., WDAY Xtra/ESPN+		South Dakota	W 86–82 ^{OT}	14–7 (8–3)	28 – Hamling	8 – Hamling	3 – Schulte	Scheels Center (712); Fargo, ND
February 4, 2023; 1:00 p.m., WDAY Xtra/ESPN+		South Dakota State	L 54–82	14–8 (8–4)	11 – Evans	7 – Brown	4 – Hamling	Scheels Center (1,722); Fargo, ND
February 9, 2023; 7:05 p.m.		at Omaha	L 58–63	14–9 (8–5)	16 – Evans	15 – Evans	4 – Hamling	Baxter Arena (453); Omaha, NE
February 11, 2023; 2:00 p.m.		at Denver	L 71–83	14–10 (8–6)	14 – Hamling	6 – Ekofo Yomane	3 – tied	Hamilton Gymnasium (472); Denver, CO
February 16, 2023; 7:00 p.m., WDAY Xtra/ESPN+		Kansas City	W 86–75	15–10 (9–6)	21 – Hamling	12 – Behnke	5 – Hamling	Scheels Center (709); Fargo, ND
February 18, 2023; 12:00 p.m., WDAY Xtra/ESPN+		Oral Roberts	W 103–86	16–10 (10–6)	29 – Hamling	9 – Brown	6 – Hamling	Scheels Center (782); Fargo, ND
February 23, 2023; 7:00 p.m.		at St. Thomas	W 64–44	17–10 (11–6)	17 – Evans	8 – Brown	4 – tied	Schoenecker Arena (551); Saint Paul, MN
February 25, 2023; 2:00 p.m., ESPN3		at Western Illinois	W 82–74	18–10 (12–6)	31 – Hamling	11 – Brown	5 – Schulte	Western Hall (746); Macomb, IL
Summit League tournament
March 4, 2023; 3:00 p.m., MidcoSN/ESPN+	(2)	vs. (10) Kansas City; Quarterfinals	L 64–71	18–11	16 – Hamling	7 – tied	5 – tied	Denny Sanford Premier Center (6,830); Sioux Falls, SD
Women's National Invitation Tournament (WNIT)
March 17, 2023; 9:00 p.m.		at Oregon; First round	L 57–96	18–12	16 – Hamling	6 – Hamling	7 – Schulte	Matthew Knight Arena (2,703); Eugene, OR
*Non-conference game. ^{#}Rankings from AP poll. (#) Tournament seedings in parentheses. All times are in Central.

== Awards and accolades ==
=== Summit League Player of the Week ===
Week	Player(s) of the Week	School
November 28	Heaven Hamling	North Dakota State
January 3	Heaven Hamling (2)	North Dakota State (2)
February 20	Heaven Hamling (3)	North Dakota State (3)

=== Summit League regular season awards ===
==== Freshman of the Year ====
- Elle Evans

==== All-Summit League First Team ====
- Heaven Hamling

==== All-Summit League Honorable Mention ====
- Elle Evans

==== All-Summit League Defensive Team ====
- Elle Evans

==== All-Summit League Newcomer Team ====
- Elle Evans
