= 2022–23 Summit League women's basketball season =

- League: NCAA Division I
- Sport: Basketball
- Teams: 10
- TV partner(s): WDAY, Midco Sports Network

Regular season
- Regular season champion: South Dakota State
- Season MVP: Myah Selland, South Dakota State

Summit League tournament
- Champions: South Dakota State
- Runners-up: Omaha
- Tournament MVP: Haleigh Timmer, South Dakota State

Summit League women's basketball seasons
- ← 2021–22 2023–24 →

2022–23 Summit League women's basketball standings
	Conf.				Overall
Team	W		L	PCT	W		L	PCT
South Dakota State †	18	–	0	1.000	29	–	6	.829
North Dakota State	12	–	6	.667	18	–	12	.600
North Dakota	11	–	7	.611	19	–	13	.594
South Dakota	10	–	8	.556	14	–	16	.467
Oral Roberts	8	–	10	.444	12	–	19	.387
Omaha	8	–	10	.444	15	–	17	.469
Denver	8	–	10	.444	12	–	18	.400
St. Thomas*	7	–	11	.389	13	–	17	.433
Western Illinois	5	–	13	.278	10	–	20	.333
Kansas City	3	–	15	.167	9	–	23	.281
† 2023 Summit League Tournament winner * Ineligible for the 2023 NCAA tournament due to transition from Division III; As of March 19, 2023

The United States 2022–23 Summit League women's basketball season began non-conference play on November 7, 2022. The conference schedule began on December 19, 2022. This will be the sixteenth season under the Summit League name and the 41st since the conference was established under its current charter as the Association of Mid-Continent Universities in 1982.

The Summit League tournament took place from March 3–7, 2023. South Dakota State won the tournament after beating Omaha in the tournament final, and advanced to the NCAA tournament. Since the Jacks were the regular season winner as well, North Dakota State was automatically invited to participate in the 2023 Women's National Invitation Tournament. North Dakota received an invitation to play in the Women's Basketball Invitational.

== Pre-season ==
=== Preseason watchlists ===
Below is a table of notable preseason watch lists.

Wooden	Naismith	Lieberman	Drysdale	Miller	McClain	Leslie	Wade
		—	―	Myah Selland – South Dakota State	―	―	

=== Preseason polls ===
==== Summit League Coaches' Poll ====
Women's Basketball Preseason Poll (Coaches)
Place	Team	Points	First place votes
1.	South Dakota State	746	36
2.	South Dakota	676	4
3.	Oral Roberts	602	―
4.	North Dakota	522	―
5.	North Dakota State	475	―
6.	Kansas City	388	―
7.	Western Illinois	308	―
8.	Denver	227	―
9.	St. Thomas	211	―
10.	Omaha	199	―

=== Summit League Preseason All-Conference ===
==== Preseason All-Summit League First Team ====
Key
Symbol	Meaning
†	Preseason player of the year automatically earns a spot on the first team

Name	School	Yr.	Pos.	Ht.	Hometown (Last School)
Kacie Borowicz	North Dakota	Sr.	G	5'9	Roseau, MN (Roseau HS)
Heaven Hamling	North Dakota State	Sr.	G	5'8	Grand Rapids, MN (Grand Rapids HS)
Paiton Burckhard	South Dakota State	Sr.	F	6'0	Aberdeen, SD (Aberdeen Central HS)
Tirzah Moore	Oral Roberts	So.	F	6'0	Oklahoma City, OK (Jones HS)
Paige Meyer	South Dakota State	So.	G	5'6	Albany, MN (Albany HS)
Myah Selland †	South Dakota State	R-Sr.	F	6'1	Letcher, SD (Sanborn Central/Woonsocket HS)

==== Preseason All-Summit League Second Team ====
Name	School	Yr.	Pos.	Ht.	Hometown (Last School)
Jade Hill	St. Thomas	So.	G	5'7	Minneapolis, MN (South HS)
Grace Larkins	South Dakota	So.	G	5'9	Altoona, IA (Southeast Polk HS)
Elizabeth Lutz	Western Illinois	GS.	G	5'7	California, MO (California HS)
Tori Nelson	South Dakota State	Jr.	F	6'1	Mendota Heights, MN (Two Rivers HS)
RaVon Nero	Kansas City	GS.	G	5'9	Edmond, OK (Edmond Santa Fe HS)

=== Midseason watchlists ===
Below is a table of notable midseason watch lists.

Wooden	Naismith	Lieberman	Drysdale	Miller	McClain	Leslie	Wade
				Myah Selland – South Dakota State			

== Regular season ==
The schedule was released in early August.

=== Records against other conferences ===
2022–23 records against non-conference foes as of March 20, 2023:

**Regular season**

Power 7 Conferences	Record
American	1–4
ACC	1–0
Big East	0–3
Big Ten	2–3
Big 12	1–4
Pac-12	0–2
SEC	1–3
Power 7 Conferences Total	6–19
Other NCAA Division 1 Conferences	Record
America East	0–0
A-10	1–1
ASUN	1–0
Big Sky	4–9
Big South	1–0
Big West	0–1
CAA	0–0
C-USA	0–1
Horizon	2–1
Independent	2–0
Ivy League	0–0
MAAC	1–0
MAC	1–3
MEAC	1–0
MVC	4–5
Mountain West	3–5
NEC	0–0
OVC	4–5
Patriot League	1–0
SoCon	0–0
Southland	0–1
SWAC	0–0
Sun Belt	0–1
WAC	3–4
WCC	2–2
Other Division I Total	31–39
Division II Total	2–0
Division III Total	2–0
NCAA Division I Total	37–58
NAIA Total	9–0
Non-Conference Total	50-58

**Post Season**

Power 7 Conferences	Record
American	0–0
ACC	0–1
Big East	0–0
Big Ten	0–0
Big 12	0–0
Pac-12	1–1
SEC	0–0
Power 7 Conferences Total	1–2
Other NCAA Division 1 Conferences	Record
America East	0–0
A-10	0–0
ASUN	0–0
Big Sky	0–0
Big South	0–0
Big West	0–0
CAA	0–0
C-USA	0–1
Horizon	0–0
Ivy League	0–0
MAAC	0–0
MAC	1–0
MEAC	0–0
MVC	0–0
Mountain West	0–0
NEC	0–0
OVC	0–0
Patriot League	0–0
SoCon	0–0
Southland	0–0
SWAC	0–0
Sun Belt	0–0
WAC	0–1
WCC	0–0
Other Division I Total	1–2
NCAA Division I Total	2–4

=== Record against ranked non-conference opponents ===
This is a list of games against ranked opponents only (rankings from the AP Poll):

Date	Visitor	Home	Site	Significance	Score	Conference record
Nov 7	**Omaha**	No. 22 Nebraska	Pinnacle Bank Arena ● Lincoln, NE	―	**L 36**–100	0–1
Nov 7	**Oral Roberts**	No. 15 Oklahoma	Lloyd Noble Center ● Norman, OK	―	**L 94**–105	0–2
Nov 7	No. 21 Creighton	**No. 23 South Dakota State**	Frost Arena ● Brookings, SD	―	**L 69**–78	0–3
Nov 10	No. 21 Creighton	**South Dakota**	Sanford Coyote Sports Center ● Vermillion, SD	―	**L 51**–74	0–4
Nov 21	**South Dakota State**	No. 10 Louisville †	Imperial Arena ● Paradise Island, Bahamas	Battle 4 Atlantis	**W 65**–55	1–4
Nov 22	No. 16 Creighton	**Omaha**	Baxter Arena ● Omaha, NE	―	**L 71**–93	1–5
Dec 7	**Kansas City**	No. 24 Kansas State	Bramlage Coliseum ● Manhattan, KS	―	**L 45**–72	1–6
Dec 10	**South Dakota State**	No. 24 Kansas State †	Municipal Auditorium ● Kansas City, MO	―	**W 82**–78	2–6
Dec 15	**South Dakota State**	No. 1 South Carolina †	Sanford Pentagon ● Sioux Falls, SD	―	**L 44**–62	2–7
Mar 19	**South Dakota State**	No. 4 Virginia Tech	Cassell Coliseum ● Blacksburg, VA	NCAA tournament (second round)	**L 60**–72	2–8

Team rankings are reflective of AP poll when the game was played, not current or final ranking

† denotes game was played on neutral site

=== Conference schedule ===
This table summarizes the head-to-head results between teams in conference play.

	Denver	Kansas City	North Dakota	North Dakota State	Omaha	Oral Roberts	St. Thomas	South Dakota	South Dakota State	Western Illinois
vs. Denver	–	0–2	2–0	1–1	2–0	2–0	0–2	1–1	2–0	0–2
vs. Kansas City	2–0	–	1–1	2–0	1–1	1–1	2–0	2–0	2–0	2–0
vs. North Dakota	0–2	1–1	–	1–1	0–2	1–1	1–1	1–1	2–0	0–2
vs. North Dakota State	1–1	0–2	1–1	–	1–1	1–1	0–2	0–2	2–0	0–2
vs. Omaha	0–2	1–1	2–0	1–1	–	2–0	0–2	2–0	2–0	0–2
vs. Oral Roberts	0–2	1–1	1–1	1–1	0–2	–	2–0	2–0	2–0	1–1
vs. St. Thomas	2–0	0–2	1–1	2–0	2–0	0–2	–	1–1	2–0	1–1
vs. South Dakota	1–1	0–2	1–1	2–0	0–2	0–2	1–1	–	2–0	1–1
vs. South Dakota State	0–2	0–2	0–2	0–2	0–2	0–2	0–2	0–2	–	0–2
vs. Western Illinois	2–0	0–2	2–0	2–0	2–0	1–1	1–1	1–1	2–0	–
Total	8–10	3–15	11–7	12–6	8–10	8–10	7–11	10–8	18–0	5–13

As of February 25, 2023

=== Points scored ===
Team	For	Against	Difference
Denver	1903	2036	-133
Kansas City	1830	2108	-278
North Dakota	2075	1923	+152
North Dakota State	2023	1924	+99
Omaha	1911	2026	-115
Oral Roberts	2268	2397	-129
St. Thomas	1780	1793	-13
South Dakota	2025	1979	+46
South Dakota State	2353	1821	+532
Western Illinois	1975	2134	-159

Through February 25, 2023

=== Rankings ===
	Improvement in ranking
	Drop in ranking
RV	Received votes but were not ranked in Top 25
NV	No votes received

		Pre	Wk 2	Wk 3	Wk 4	Wk 5	Wk 6	Wk 7	Wk 8	Wk 9	Wk 10	Wk 11	Wk 12	Wk 13	Wk 14	Wk 15	Wk 16	Wk 17	Wk 18	Wk 19	Final
Denver	AP	NV	NV	NV	NV	NV	NV	NV	NV	NV	NV	NV	NV	NV	NV	NV	NV				
Denver	C	NV	NV	NV	NV	NV	NV	NV	NV	NV	NV	NV	NV	NV	NV	NV	NV				
Kansas City	AP	NV	NV	NV	NV	NV	NV	NV	NV	NV	NV	NV	NV	NV	NV	NV	NV				
Kansas City	C	NV	NV	NV	NV	NV	NV	NV	NV	NV	NV	NV	NV	NV	NV	NV	NV				
North Dakota	AP	NV	NV	NV	NV	NV	NV	NV	NV	NV	NV	NV	NV	NV	NV	NV	NV				
North Dakota	C	NV	NV	NV	NV	NV	NV	NV	NV	NV	NV	NV	NV	NV	NV	NV	NV				
North Dakota State	AP	NV	NV	NV	NV	NV	NV	NV	NV	NV	NV	NV	NV	NV	NV	NV	NV				
North Dakota State	C	RV	NV	NV	NV	NV	NV	NV	NV	NV	NV	NV	NV	NV	NV	NV	NV				
Omaha	AP	NV	NV	NV	NV	NV	NV	NV	NV	NV	NV	NV	NV	NV	NV	NV	NV				
Omaha	C	NV	NV	NV	NV	NV	NV	NV	NV	NV	NV	NV	NV	NV	NV	NV	NV				
Oral Roberts	AP	NV	NV	NV	NV	NV	NV	NV	NV	NV	NV	NV	NV	NV	NV	NV	NV				
Oral Roberts	C	NV	NV	NV	NV	NV	NV	NV	NV	NV	NV	NV	NV	NV	NV	NV	NV				
St. Thomas	AP	NV	NV	NV	NV	NV	NV	NV	NV	NV	NV	NV	NV	NV	NV	NV	NV				
St. Thomas	C	NV	NV	NV	NV	NV	NV	NV	NV	NV	NV	NV	NV	NV	NV	NV	NV				
South Dakota	AP	RV	NV	NV	NV	NV	NV	NV	NV	NV	NV	NV	NV	NV	NV	NV	NV				
South Dakota	C	RV	NV	NV	NV	NV	NV	NV	NV	NV	NV	NV	NV	NV	NV	NV	NV				
South Dakota State	AP	23	RV	RV	RV	RV	NV	NV	NV	NV	NV	NV	NV	NV	NV	RV	RV				
South Dakota State	C	24	RV	RV	RV	RV	RV	RV	RV	NV	NV	NV	NV	NV	NV	RV	RV				
Western Illinois	AP	NV	NV	NV	NV	NV	NV	NV	NV	NV	NV	NV	NV	NV	NV	NV	NV				
Western Illinois	C	NV	NV	NV	NV	NV	NV	NV	NV	NV	NV	NV	NV	NV	NV	NV	NV				

=== Home attendance ===
Team	Arena	Capacity	Total Games	Average Attendance	Attendance High	Total Attendance	% of Capacity
Denver	Hamilton Gymnasium	2,500	13	377	806; Nov. 11 vs. Northern Colorado	4,913	15.1%
Kansas City	Swinney Recreation Center	1,500	14	549	1,250; Nov. 7 vs. Westerminster (MO)	7,692	36.6%
North Dakota	Betty Engelstad Sioux Center	3,300	14	1,191	2,116; Jan. 28 vs. North Dakota St	16,674	36.1%
North Dakota State	Scheels Center	5,460	12	1,015	1,759; Nov. 17 vs. Minnesota	12,188	18.6%
Omaha	Baxter Arena	7,898	14	493	1,273; Nov. 22 vs. No. 13 Creighton	6,904	6.2%
Oral Roberts	Mabee Center	10,154	14	1,709	2,275; Feb. 25 vs. South Dakota St	23,933	16.8%
St. Thomas	Schoenecker Arena	1,800	14	454	958; Dec. 31 vs. South Dakota St	6,368	25.3%
South Dakota	Sanford Coyote Sports Center	6,000	15	1,786	3,025; Feb. 11 vs. South Dakota St	26,804	29.8%
South Dakota State	Frost Arena	6,500	14	1,486	3,136; Jan. 14 vs. South Dakota	20,805	22.9%
Western Illinois	Western Hall	5,139	15	486	806; Feb. 18 vs. St. Thomas	7,299	9.5%

Bold - Exceed capacity
As of February 25, 2023
Does not include exhibition games

== Head coaches ==
=== Coaching changes ===
==== Kansas City ====
On March 20, 2022, Jacie Hoyt left Kansas City for the Oklahoma State head coaching job. On March 30, 2022, Texas associate head coach Dionnah Jackson-Durrett was hired a new head coach.

==== Oral Roberts ====
On March 30, 2022 Misti Cussen and Oral Roberts parted ways after 10 seasons. On April 21 Golden Eagles appointed new head coach Kelsi Musick, who led the Division II member Southwestern Oklahoma State team the past 13 seasons.

==== South Dakota ====
On March 31, 2022 Dawn Plitzuweit left South Dakota after 6 seasons for the West Virginia head coaching job. Drake assistant coach Kayla Karius, who was an assistant for the Coyotes from 2016 to 2018, was hired on April 10, 2022.

=== Coaches ===
Note: Stats shown are before the beginning of the season. Overall and Summit League records are from time at current school.

Team	Head coach	Previous job	Seasons at school	Overall record	Summit record	Summit titles	NCAA tournaments	NCAA Sweet Sixteen	NCAA Championships
Denver	Doshia Woods	Tulane (recruiting coordinator)	3rd	17–36 (.321)	10–22 (.313)	0	0	0	0
Kansas City	Dionnah Jackson-Durrett	Texas (Associate head coach)	1st	0–0 (–)	0–0 (–)	0	0	0	0
North Dakota	Mallory Bernhard	North Dakota (assistant)	3rd	17–34 (.333)	11–22 (.333)	0	0	0	0
North Dakota State	Jory Collins	Kansas (assistant)	4th	37–46 (.446)	23-27 (.460)	0	0	0	0
Omaha	Carrie Banks	Ohio State (assistant)	3rd	14–32 (.304)	7–22 (.241)	0	0	0	0
Oral Roberts	Kelsi Musick	Southwestern Oklahoma State	1st	0–0 (–)	0–0 (–)	0	0	0	0
St. Thomas	Ruth Sinn	Apple Valley HS	18th	363–109 (.769)	4–14 (.222) †	0	0	0	0
South Dakota	Kayla Karius	Drake (assistant)	1st	0–0 (–)	0–0 (–)	0	0	0	0
South Dakota State	Aaron Johnston	South Dakota State (assistant)	23rd	542–179 (.752)	210–34 (.861)	10	11	1	0
Western Illinois	JD Gravina	Quincy	12th	170–161 (.514)	88–85 (.509)	0	1	0	0

Notes:

- † St. Thomas joined the Summit League in the summer of 2021.
- Overall and Summit League records, conference titles, etc. are from time at current school and are through the end the 2021–22 season.
- NCAA tournament appearances are from time at current school only.

== Awards and honors ==
=== Players of the Week ===
Throughout the conference regular season, the Summit League offices named one or two players of the week each Monday.

Week	Player of the Week	School	Ref.
Nov. 14	Hannah Cooper	Oral Roberts	
Nov. 21	Kacie Borowicz	North Dakota	
Nov. 28	Heaven Hamling	North Dakota State	
Dec 5	Kacie Borowicz (2)	North Dakota (2)	
Dec 12	Hannah Cooper (2)	Oral Roberts (2)	
Dec 19	Hannah Cooper (3)	Oral Roberts (3)	
Dec 27	Grace Larkins	South Dakota	
Jan. 3	Heaven Hamling (2)	North Dakota State (2)	
Jan 9	Myah Selland	South Dakota State	
Jan 16	Anna Deets	Western Illinois	
Jan 23	Tirzah Moore	Oral Roberts (4)	
Jan. 30	Hannah Cooper (4)	Oral Roberts (5)	
Feb. 6	Grace Cave	Omaha	
Feb. 13	Jo Langbehn	St. Thomas	
Feb. 20	Heaven Hamling (3)	North Dakota State (3)	
Feb. 27	Myah Selland (2)	South Dakota State (2)	

=== Summit League Awards ===
The All-Summit League teams and the player of the year awards were announced on March 2, 2023 ahead of the start of the Summit League tournament.

2023 Summit League Women's Basketball Individual Awards
Award	Recipient(s)
Player of the Year	Myah Selland – South Dakota State
Coach of the Year	Aaron Johnston – South Dakota State
Defensive Player of the Year	Makayla Minett – Denver
Freshman of the Year	Elle Evans – North Dakota State
Sixth Player of the Year	Kallie Theisen – South Dakota State
Newcomer of the Year	E'Lease Stafford – Kansas City

Honor	Recipient
All-Summit League First Team	Myah Selland, South Dakota State
All-Summit League First Team	Heaven Hamling, North Dakota State
All-Summit League First Team	Hannah Cooper, Oral Roberts
All-Summit League First Team	Tirzah Moore, Oral Roberts
All-Summit League First Team	Kacie Borowicz, North Dakota
All-Summit League First Team	Grace Larkins, South Dakota
All-Summit League Second Team	Paiton Burckhard, South Dakota State
All-Summit League Second Team	Haleigh Timmer, South Dakota State
All-Summit League Second Team	Maggie Negaard, St. Thomas
All-Summit League Second Team	Elena Pilakouta, Omaha
All-Summit League Second Team	Paige Meyer, South Dakota State
All-Summit League Honorable Mention	Anna Deets, Western Illinois
All-Summit League Honorable Mention	Elle Evans, North Dakota State
All-Summit League Honorable Mention	Makayla Minett, Denver
All-Summit League Honorable Mention	Emma Smith, Denver
All-Summit League Honorable Mention	E'Lease Stafford, Kansas City
All-Defensive Team	Hannah Cooper, Oral Roberts
All-Defensive Team	Elle Evans, North Dakota State
All-Defensive Team	Grace Larkins, South Dakota
All-Defensive Team	Makayla Minett, Denver
All-Defensive Team	Claire Orth, North Dakota
All-Newcomer Team	Elle Evans, North Dakota State
All-Newcomer Team	Dru Gylten, South Dakota State
All-Newcomer Team	Emma Smith, Denver
All-Newcomer Team	E'Lease Stafford, Kansas City
All-Newcomer Team	Ruthie Udoumoh, Oral Roberts

== Postseason ==
=== Summit League tournament ===
First Round; March 3 ESPN+
8	St. Thomas	61
9	Western Illinois	50
7	Denver	65
10	Kansas City	66

Quarterfinals; March 4 & 5 ESPN+
1	South Dakota State	87
8	St. Thomas	59
4	South Dakota	69
5	Oral Roberts	92
2	North Dakota State	64
10	Kansas City	71
3	North Dakota	81
6	Omaha	84

Semifinals; March 6 ESPN+
1	South Dakota State	87
5	Oral Roberts	60
10	Kansas City	60
6	Omaha	69

Championship; March 7 ESPNU
1	South Dakota State	93
6	Omaha	51

=== NCAA tournament ===
Only South Dakota State was selected to participate in the tournament as the conference's automatic bid.

Seed	Region	School	First round	Second round	Sweet Sixteen	Elite Eight	Final Four	Championship
No. 9	Seattle Regional	South Dakota State	defeated No. 8 USC 62–57 ^{(OT)}	lost to No. 1 Virginia Tech 60–72	—	—	—	—
	1 Bid	W-L (%):	1–0 (1.000)	0–1 (.000)	0–0 (–)	0–0 (–)	0–0 (–)	TOTAL: 1–1 (.500)

=== WNIT ===
As the next best regular season finishing team in the conference, North Dakota State was the only team selected to participate in the tournament.

School	First round	Second round	Third round	Quarterfinal	Final Four	Championship
North Dakota State	lost to Oregon 57–96	—	—	—	—	—
W-L (%):	0–1 (.000)	0–0 (–)	0–0 (–)	0–0 (–)	0–0 (–)	TOTAL: 0–1 (.000)

=== WBI ===
Only one team was invited to play in the 2023 Women's Basketball Invitational, and that was North Dakota.

School	Quarterfinal	Consolation	Consolation Championship
North Dakota	lost to Cal Baptist 79–96	defeated Northern Illinois 102–99	lost to FIU 73–76
W-L (%):	0–1 (.000)	1–0 (1.000)	0–1 (.000); TOTAL: 1–2 (.333)
