= 2022–23 South Dakota State Jackrabbits women's basketball team =

Intercollegiate basketball season

2022–23 South Dakota State Jackrabbits women's basketball

Summit League regular-season and tournament champions

NCAA tournament, second round
- Conference: Summit League
- Record: 29–6 (18–0 The Summit)
- Head coach: Aaron Johnston (23rd full, 24th overall season)
- Assistant coaches: Carissa Thielbar (9th season); Megan Lueck (5th season); Sadie Thramer (2nd season)
- Home arena: Frost Arena

2022–23 Summit League women's basketball standings
	Conf.				Overall
Team	W		L	PCT	W		L	PCT
South Dakota State †	18	–	0	1.000	29	–	6	.829
North Dakota State	12	–	6	.667	18	–	12	.600
North Dakota	11	–	7	.611	19	–	13	.594
South Dakota	10	–	8	.556	14	–	16	.467
Oral Roberts	8	–	10	.444	12	–	19	.387
Omaha	8	–	10	.444	15	–	17	.469
Denver	8	–	10	.444	12	–	18	.400
St. Thomas*	7	–	11	.389	13	–	17	.433
Western Illinois	5	–	13	.278	10	–	20	.333
Kansas City	3	–	15	.167	9	–	23	.281
† 2023 Summit League Tournament winner * Ineligible for the 2023 NCAA tournament due to transition from Division III; As of March 19, 2023

The 2022–23 South Dakota State Jackrabbits women's basketball team represented South Dakota State University in the 2022–23 NCAA Division I women's basketball season. The Jackrabbits, led by 23rd-year head coach Aaron Johnston, competed in the Summit League. They played their home games in Frost Arena in Brookings, South Dakota.

The Jackrabbits went 29–6 overall and 18–0 in conference play for the season. They won the Summit League tournament by beating sixth seed Omaha 93–51. They earned an automatic bid to the 2023 NCAA tournament as a nine seed in the Seattle Region. The Jackrabbits beat USC in the first round 62–57 in overtime. In the second round, they lost to number one seed Virginia Tech 72–60.

== Previous season ==
In the 2021–22 season, the Jackrabbits went 29–9 overall and 17–1 in conference play. They finished tied for first in conference play, and with a tiebreaker system in place, they were seeded number one in the 2022 Summit League women's basketball tournament based on a higher NCA NET ranking. The Jackrabbits finished off number eight seed Denver 86–59 in the first round, and then passed by number four seed Oral Roberts 72−53. In the championship game, the Jackrabbits fell to the number two seed South Dakota 56–45.

The Jackrabbits were one of the top teams to miss the 2022 NCAA tournament, but were an automatic qualifier for the 2022 Women's National Invitation Tournament. In their first-round game they played Ohio and won 87–57. Their second-round match-up against Big Ten opponent Minnesota ended with the Jackrabbits on top 78–57. The Jackrabbits faced Drake in the third round of the WNIT and slipped past them 84−66. The Jackrabbits' quarterfinals match was against SEC opponent Alabama, whom they beat 78−73. The Jackrabbits' semifinal game was a rematch from November against UCLA of the Pac-12, and, like the first match-up, ended in a Jackrabbits win. The Jackrabbits moved past the Bruins 62–59. The Jackrabbits, hosting the WNIT championship game, played Seton Hall and beat them 82–50, winning their first WNIT championship.

=== Departures ===
Name	Number	Pos.	Height	Year	Hometown	Reason for departure
Lindsey Theuninck	3	G	5' 7"	RS junior	Mankato, MN	Graduated
Haley Greer	11	G	5' 10"	Graduate student	Winnetka, IL	Graduated
Tylee Irwin	21	G	6' 0"	Senior	Wahpeton, ND	Graduated
Addison Hirschman	52	C	6' 2"	Senior	Kingsley, IA	Graduated

=== Additions ===
Name	Number	Pos.	Height	Year	Hometown	Notes
Madison Mathiowetz	3	G	5' 10"	Freshman	Sleepy Eye, MN	Signed for the 2022–23 season
Ellie Colbeck	5	G	5' 10"	Freshman	Fergus Falls, MN	Signed for the 2022–23 season
Dru Gylten	10	G	5' 10"	Graduate student	Rapid City, SD	Transferred from Utah
Brooklyn Meyer	31	F	6' 2"	Freshman	Larchwood, IA	Signed for the 2022–23 season
Natalie Nielsen	34	F	6' 3"	Freshman	Akron, IA	Signed for the 2022–23 season

== Roster ==
2022–23 South Dakota State Jackrabbits women's basketball team
Players
Coaches

Pos.	#	Name	Height	Year	Previous school	Hometown
G	3	Madison Mathiowetz	5 ft 10 in (1.78 m)	Fr	St. Mary's High School	Sleepy Eye, MN
G	5	Ellie Colbeck	5 ft 10 in (1.78 m)	Fr	Kennedy Secondary School	Fergus Falls, MN
G	10	Dru Gylten	5 ft 10 in (1.78 m)	GS	St. Thomas More High School; Utah	Rapid City, SD
F	12	Kallie Theisen	6 ft 1 in (1.85 m)	Jr	Wayzata High School	Plymouth, MN
G	13	Haleigh Timmer	5 ft 11 in (1.8 m)	So	St. Thomas More High School	Rapid City, SD
F	20	Tori Nelson	6 ft 1 in (1.85 m)	Jr	Henry Sibley High School	Mendota Heights, MN
G	21	Paige Meyer	5 ft 6 in (1.68 m)	So	Albany High School	Albany, MN
F	22	Madysen Vlastuin	6 ft 1 in (1.85 m)	So	Lennox High School	Lennox, SD
F	24	Mesa Byom	6 ft 2 in (1.88 m)	So	Melrose-Mindoro High School	Melrose, WI
F	31	Brooklyn Meyer	6 ft 2 in (1.88 m)	Fr	West Lyon Community School	Larchwood, IA
F	33	Paiton Burckhard	6 ft 0 in (1.83 m)	Sr	Aberdeen Central High School	Aberdeen, SD
F	34	Natalie Nielsen	6 ft 3 in (1.91 m)	Fr	Akron–Westfield Senior High School	Akron, IA
F	42	Regan Nesheim	6 ft 1 in (1.85 m)	RS Jr	Johnston High School	Johnston, IA
F	44	Myah Selland	6 ft 1 in (1.85 m)	RS Sr	Sanborn Central/Woonsocket High School	Letcher, SD

Head coach

- Aaron Johnston (Gustavus Adolphus)

Assistant coach(es)

- Carissa Thielbar (UW–Superior)
- Megan Lueck (Minnesota Duluth)
- Sadie Thramer (Wayne State (MI))

Legend

- (C) Team captain
- (S) Suspended
- (I) Ineligible
- (W) Walk-on
- Injured
- Current redshirt

Roster
Last update: May 3, 2025

== Schedule ==
Date time, TV	Rank^{#}	Opponent^{#}	Result	Record	Site (attendance) city, state
Exhibition
November 2, 2022*; 6:00 p.m.	No. 23	Southwest Minnesota State	W 105–58	0–0	Frost Arena; Brookings, SD
Non-conference regular season
November 7, 2022*; 7:00 p.m., MidcoSN2/ESPN3	No. 23	No. 21 Creighton	L 69–78	0–1	Frost Arena (2,504); Brookings, SD
November 11, 2022*; 7:00 p.m.	No. 23	Lehigh	W 91–73	1–1	Frost Arena (1,667); Brookings, SD
November 14, 2022*; 6:00 p.m., MidcoSN		Mississippi State	W 63–62	2–1	Frost Arena (1,787); Brookings, SD
November 19, 2022*; 1:30 p.m., FloHoops		vs. UCLA; Battle 4 Atlantis quarterfinals	L 65–72	2–2	Imperial Arena (235); Nassau, Bahamas
November 20, 2022*; 4:00 p.m., FloHoops		vs. Rutgers; Battle 4 Atlantis consolation 2nd round	W 75–56	3–2	Imperial Arena (128); Nassau, Bahamas
November 21, 2022*; 5:00 p.m., FloHoops		vs. No. 10 Louisville; Battle 4 Atlantis 5th-place game	W 65–55	4–2	Imperial Arena (215); Nassau, Bahamas
November 28, 2022*; 9:00 p.m.		at Washington State	L 41–61	4–3	Beasley Coliseum (630); Pullman, WA
November 30, 2022*; 8:00 p.m., ESPN+		at Montana State	L 66–71	4–4	Brick Breeden Fieldhouse (1,464); Bozeman, MT
December 3, 2022*; 7:00 p.m.		Northern Iowa	W 80–69	5–4	Frost Arena (1,869); Brookings, SD
December 10, 2022*; 1:00 p.m.		vs. No. 24 Kansas State	W 82–78	6–4	Municipal Auditorium (673); Kansas City, MO
December 12, 2022*; 6:00 p.m., MidcoSN		UT Martin	W 75–36	7–4	Frost Arena (743); Brookings, SD
December 15, 2022*; 6:00 p.m., ESPN2		vs. No. 1 South Carolina	L 44–62	7–5	Sanford Pentagon (2,369); Sioux Falls, SD
Summit League regular season
December 19, 2022; 7:00 p.m., MidcoSN2		Oral Roberts	W 83–80	8–5 (1–0)	Frost Arena (1,281); Brookings, SD
December 21, 2022; 12:00 p.m.		Kansas City	W 86–54	9–5 (2–0)	Frost Arena (557); Brookings, SD
December 29, 2022; 6:00 p.m.		at Western Illinois	W 85–63	10–5 (3–0)	Western Hall (364); Macomb, IL
December 31, 2022; 1:00 p.m.		at St. Thomas	W 61–51	11–5 (4–0)	Schoenecker Arena (958); St. Paul, MN
January 5, 2023; 7:00 p.m.		North Dakota State	W 94–63	12–5 (5–0)	Frost Arena (1,341); Brookings, SD
January 7, 2023; 2:00 p.m., MidcoSN2		North Dakota	W 105–72	13–5 (6–0)	Frost Arena (1,299); Brookings, SD
January 14, 2023; 1:00 p.m., MidcoSN		South Dakota	W 118–59	14–5 (7–0)	Frost Arena (3,136); Brookings, SD
January 19, 2023; 7:00 p.m.		at Omaha	W 68–61	15–5 (8–0)	Baxter Arena (478); Omaha, NE
January 21, 2023; 2:00 p.m.		at Denver	W 74–64	16–5 (9–0)	Hamilton Gymnasium (393); Denver, CO
January 26, 2023; 7:00 p.m., MidcoSN/ESPN+		St. Thomas	W 99–57	17–5 (10–0)	Frost Arena (1,322); Brookings, SD
January 28, 2023; 2:00 p.m.		Western Illinois	W 81–58	18–5 (11–0)	Frost Arena (2,031); Brookings, SD
February 2, 2023; 7:00 p.m., MidcoSN		at North Dakota	W 75–57	19–5 (12–0)	Betty Engelstad Sioux Center (1,381); Grand Forks, ND
February 4, 2023; 1:00 p.m., WDAY Xtra/ESPN+		at North Dakota State	W 82–54	20–5 (13–0)	Scheels Center (1,722); Fargo, ND
February 11, 2023; 1:00 p.m., MidcoSN/ESPN3		at South Dakota	W 79–48	21–5 (14–0)	Sanford Coyote Sports Center (3,025); Vermillion, SD
February 16, 2023; 7:00 p.m., MidcoSN2		Denver	W 82–34	22–5 (15–0)	Frost Arena (1,835); Brookings, SD
February 18, 2023; 2:00 p.m.		Omaha	W 87–54	23–5 (16–0)	Frost Arena (2,569); Brookings, SD
February 23, 2023; 7:00 p.m.		at Kansas City	W 86–52	24–5 (17–0)	Municipal Auditorium (622); Kansas City, MO
February 25, 2023; 2:00 p.m.		at Oral Roberts	W 92–67	25–5 (18–0)	Mabee Center (2,275); Tulsa, OK
Summit League women's tournament
March 4, 2023; 12:30 p.m., MidcoSN/ESPN+	(1)	vs. (8) St. Thomas; Quarterfinals	W 87–59	26–5	Denny Sanford Premier Center; Sioux Falls, SD
March 6, 2023; 12:30 p.m., MidcoSN/ESPN+	(1)	vs. (5) Oral Roberts; Semifinals	W 87–60	27–5	Denny Sanford Premier Center; Sioux Falls, SD
March 7, 2023; 1:00 p.m., ESPNU	(1)	vs. (6) Omaha; Championship	W 93–51	28–5	Denny Sanford Premier Center (6,002); Sioux Falls, SD
NCAA women's tournament
March 17, 2023*; 7:00 p.m., ESPNews	(9 S3)	vs. (8 S3) USC; First round	W 62–57 ^{OT}	29–5	Cassell Coliseum (8,925); Blacksburg, VA
March 19, 2023*; 4:00 p.m., ESPN2	(9 S3)	at (1 S3) No. 4 Virginia Tech; Second round	L 60–72	29–6	Cassell Coliseum (8,925); Blacksburg, VA
*Non-conference game. ^{#}Rankings from AP poll. (#) Tournament seedings in parentheses. All times are in Central.

== Rankings ==
Regular-season polls
Poll	Pre- season	Week 2	Week 3	Week 4	Week 5	Week 6	Week 7	Week 8	Week 9	Week 10	Week 11	Week 12	Week 13	Week 14	Week 15	Week 16	Week 17	Week 18	Week 19	Final
AP	23	RV	RV	RV											RV	RV	RV	RV	RV	
Coaches	24	RV	RV	RV	RV	RV	RV	RV							RV	RV	RV	RV	RV	

Legend
	Increase in ranking
	Decrease in ranking
	Not ranked previous week
(RV)	Received votes
(NR)	Not ranked

== Player statistics ==
Individual player statistics (final)
Player	GP	GS	MPG	FG%	3P%	FT%	RPG	APG	SPG	BPG	PPG
Selland, Myah	35	35	29.1	.531%	.425%	.800%	6.4	2.4	1.5	0.4	16.1
Timmer, Haleigh	35	35	27.7	.460%	.373%	.720%	3.6	1.6	1.0	0.1	12.1
Meyer, Paige	23	10	22.2	.557%	.488%	.764%	2.8	2.1	0.9	0.0	10.5
Bruckhard, Paiton	35	35	23.5	.483%	.265%	.696%	5.1	1.6	1.1	0.2	10.2
Nelson, Tori	35	35	25.7	.457%	.228%	.756%	3.4	2.4	0.6	0.9	7.9
Theisen, Kallie	35	0	16.9	.477%	.286%	.647%	6.4	0.9	0.7	1.3	6.1
Meyer, Brooklyn	35	0	12.5	.500%	-	.560%	3.6	0.7	0.3	0.6	5.6
Gylten, Dru	34	17	18.9	.396%	.375%	.795%	2.1	3.2	0.7	0.1	4.4
Vlastuin, Madysen	32	0	12.7	.388%	.371%	1.000%	1.7	0.7	0.4	0.0	4.2
Mathiowetz, Madison	32	1	10.7	.353%	.256%	.829%	1.5	0.7	0.2	0.0	3.1
Byom, Mesa	21	0	3.8	.630%	.167%	.750%	1.3	0.1	0.0	0.2	2.0
Colbeck, Ellie	28	7	8.9	.300%	.250%	.733%	1.0	0.7	0.1	0.0	1.7
Nesheim, Regan	15	0	3.9	.250%	.000%	.000%	0.4	0.0	0.1	0.1	0.1
Total	35	-	200.7	.473%	.348%	.721%	40.6	16.7	7.5	3.9	78.3
