= 2001 NCAA Division III women's basketball tournament =

- Teams: 50
- Finals site: O'Neill Center, Danbury, Connecticut
- Champions: Washington University Bears (4th title)
- Runner-up: Messiah Falcons (1st title game)
- Third place: Emmanuel Saints (1st Final Four)
- Fourth place: Ohio Wesleyan Battling Bishops (1st Final Four)
- Winning coach: Nancy Fahey (4th title)
- MOP: Tasha Rodgers (Washington-St. Louis)
- Attendance: 30,212

The 2001 NCAA Division III women's basketball tournament was the 20th annual tournament hosted by the NCAA to determine the national champion of Division III women's collegiate basketball in the United States.

Three-time defending champions Washington University in St. Louis defeated Messiah University in the championship game, 67–45, to claim the Bears' fourth Division III national title, their fourth of four consecutive.

The championship rounds were hosted at the O'Neill Center at Western Connecticut State University in Danbury, Connecticut from March 16–17, 2001.

== Bracket ==
- An asterisk by a team indicates the host of first and second round games
- An asterisk by a score indicates an overtime period

=== Top left sectional ===
First round February 28, 2001; Campus sites
RPI*	54
Mount St. Mary (NY)	66
Eastern Connecticut State*	53
Bowdoin	61
Springfield*	60
Southern Maine	49
St. Lawrence*	60
Cortland State	62

Second round March 3, 2001; Campus sites
NYU*	89
Mount St. Mary (NY)	47
Bowdoin	72*
Salem State*	65
Emmanuel (MA)*	79
Springfield	56
Cortland State	70
Oneonta State*	64

Sectional semifinals March 9, 2001; New York, NY
NYU	64
Bowdoin	60
Emmanuel	87
Cortland State	70

Sectional finals March 10, 2001; New York, NY
NYU	70
Emmanuel	74*

=== Bottom left sectional ===
First round February 28, 2001; Campus sites
Fontbonne*	83
Rockford	47
Nebraska Wesleyan*	73
Carleton	51
Wartburg*	86
Chapman	78
St. Thomas (MN)*	69
Claremont-Mudd-Scripps	59
Wisconsin–Eau Claire*	71
Lakeland	43

Second round March 3, 2001; Campus sites
Millikin*	56
Fontbonne	69
Nebraska Wesleyan	71
Wartburg*	85
George Fox*	52
St. Thomas (MN)	64
Wisconsin–Eau Claire	67
Washington St. Louis*	87

Sectional semifinals March 9, 2001; St. Paul, MN
Fontbonne	78
Wartburg	82
St. Thomas (MN)	58
Washington St. Louis	65

Sectional finals March 10, 2001; St. Paul, MN
Wartburg	71
Washington St. Louis	83

=== Top right sectional ===
First round February 28, 2001; Campus sites
Ithaca*	79
New England	61
Swarthmore*	66
Gwynedd Mercy	55
Messiah*	70
Bethany (WV)	58
Marymount (VA)*	85
Staten Island	65

Second round March 3, 2001; Campus sites
TCNJ*	68
Ithaca	58
Swarthmore	58
Elizabethtown*	79
King's (PA)*	61
Messiah	68
Marymount (VA)	64
Salisbury State*	59

Sectional semifinals March 9, 2001; Ewing Township, NJ
TCNJ	68
Elizabethtown	45
Messiah	97**
Marymount (VA)	86

Sectional finals March 10, 2001; Ewing Township, NJ
TCNJ	61
Messiah	72

=== Bottom right sectional ===
First round February 28, 2001; Campus sites
Lake Forest*	55
Ohio Wesleyan	67
Centre (KY)*	87
Thomas More	86
Maryville (TN)*	77
Christopher Newport	65
Guilford*	80
Meredith	57
Defiance*	90
Penn State Behrend	59

Second round March 3, 2001; Campus sites
Hope*	71
Ohio Wesleyan	72
Centre (KY)	63
Maryville (TN)*	57
Hardin-Simmons*	106
Guilford	77
Defiance	63
Baldwin Wallace*	82

Sectional semifinals March 9, 2001; Berea, OH
Ohio Wesleyan	71
Centre (KY)	64
Hardin-Simmons	71
Baldwin Wallace*	78

Sectional finals March 10, 2001; Berea, OH
Ohio Wesleyan	66
Baldwin Wallace	64

=== Final Four ===
Final Four; March 16, 2001; O'Neill Center; Danbury, CT
Emmanuel	62
Washington St. Louis	78
Messiah	70
Ohio Wesleyan	57

National championship March 17, 2001; O'Neill Center; Danbury, CT
Washington St. Louis	67
Messiah	45
Third place
Emmanuel	54
Ohio Wesleyan	70

== All-tournament team ==
- Tasha Rodgers, Washington University in St. Louis
- Jennifer Rudis, Washington University in St. Louis
- Katy Sturtz, Ohio Wesleyan
- Amy Hitz, Messiah
- Brianne Bognanno, Emmanuel (MA)

== See also ==
- 2001 NCAA Division I women's basketball tournament
- 2001 NCAA Division II women's basketball tournament
- 2001 NAIA Division I women's basketball tournament
- 2001 NAIA Division II women's basketball tournament
- 2001 NCAA Division III men's basketball tournament
