= Lindenwood Lions men's basketball =

2026–27 Lindenwood Lions men's basketball team
- University: Lindenwood University
- Head coach: Kyle Gerdeman (8th season)
- Location: St. Charles, Missouri
- Arena: Robert F. Hyland Performance Arena (capacity: 3,270)
- Conference: Ohio Valley Conference
- Nickname: Lions
- Colors: Black and gold

The Lindenwood Lions men's basketball team represents Lindenwood University in St. Charles, Missouri, United States. The Lions currently compete in the NCAA Division I Ohio Valley Conference. The team is currently led by head coach Kyle Gerdeman. Lindenwood has never appeared in the NCAA Division I men's basketball tournament.

== Postseason results ==
=== NAIA Division II tournament results ===
The Lions appeared in the NAIA Division II men's basketball tournament twice, with a combined record of 4–2.

Year	Seed	Round	Opponent	Result
2000	—	First Round; Second Round	#15 Robert Morris (IL) #2 Huntington (IN)	W 89–47; L 49–65
2006	#8	First Round; Second Round; Quarterfinals; Semifinals	Dordt #9 Taylor #16 Mount Vernon Nazarene #4 College of the Ozarks	W 66–58; W 74–71^{OT} W 95–86; L 69–88

== See also ==
- Lindenwood Lions women's basketball
