= 2000 NAIA Division I women's basketball tournament =

- Teams: 32
- Finals site: Oman Arena, Jackson, Tennessee
- Champions: Oklahoma City Stars (3rd title, 3rd title game, 3rd Fab Four)
- Runner-up: Simon Fraser Clan (2nd title game, 3rd Fab Four)
- Semifinalists: Findlay Oilers (2nd Fab Four); Southern Nazarene Crimson Storm (9th Fab Four)
- Coach of the year: Kent Stanley (Oklahoma City)
- Player of the year: Patty Cantella (Oklahoma City)
- Charles Stevenson Hustle Award: Mianda Watts (Findlay)
- Chuck Taylor MVP: Teresa Kleindienst (Simon Fraser)
- Top scorer: Mianda Watts (Oklahoma City) (105 points)

The 2000 NAIA Division I women's basketball tournament was the tournament held by the NAIA to determine the national champion of women's college basketball among its Division I members in the United States and Canada for the 1999–2000 basketball season.

In a rematch of the 1999 NAIA Division I final, defending champions Oklahoma City defeated Simon Fraser in the championship game again, 64–55, to claim the Stars' third NAIA national title. This would go on to be the second of four consecutive titles for Oklahoma City.

The tournament was played at the Oman Arena in Jackson, Tennessee.

== Qualification ==
The tournament field remained fixed at thirty-two teams, with the top sixteen teams receiving seeds.

The tournament continued to utilize a simple single-elimination format.

== Bracket ==
First round
1	Oklahoma City	97
Olivet Nazarene	59
Life	102
16	Rio Grande	80
9	Freed–Hardeman	76
Southern New Orleans	61
Houston Baptist	55
8	Campbellsville	64
5	Findlay	76
William Carey	61
Voorhees	51
12	Oklahoma Christian	76
13	Georgia Southwestern	92
Azusa Pacific	67
Hannibal–LaGrange	62
4	Lewis–Clark State	72
3	Simon Fraser	72
Langston	55
Lambuth	65
14	Wayland Baptist	74
11	North Georgia	81
Saint Vincent	70
Spring Hill	55
6	Union (TN)	70
7	Southern Nazarene	77
Central State (OH)	69
Western Montana	79
10	Vanguard	60
15	Trevecca Nazarene	64
Oklahoma Baptist	63
Claflin	33
2	Auburn Montgomery	67

Second round
1	Oklahoma City	80
Life	69
9	Freed–Hardeman	64
8	Campbellsville	72
5	Findlay	92
12	Oklahoma Christian	81
13	Georgia Southwestern	45
4	Lewis–Clark State	88
3	Simon Fraser	87
14	Wayland Baptist	73
11	North Georgia	81
6	Union (TN)	65
7	Southern Nazarene	66
Western Montana	53
15	Trevecca Nazarene	46
2	Auburn Montgomery	61

Elite Eight
1	Oklahoma City	69
8	Campbellsville	65
5	Findlay	86
4	Lewis–Clark State	65
3	Simon Fraser	66
11	North Georgia	58
7	Southern Nazarene	56
2	Auburn Montgomery	54

Final Four
1	Oklahoma City	75
5	Findlay	52
3	Simon Fraser	77
7	Southern Nazarene	62

National championship
1	Oklahoma City	64
3	Simon Fraser	55

== See also ==
- 2000 NAIA Division I men's basketball tournament
- 2000 NCAA Division I women's basketball tournament
- 2000 NCAA Division II women's basketball tournament
- 2000 NCAA Division III women's basketball tournament
- 2000 NAIA Division II women's basketball tournament
