= 2000 NCAA Division II women's basketball tournament =

- Teams: 48
- Finals site: , Pine Bluff, Arkansas
- Champions: Northern Kentucky Norse (1st title)
- Runner-up: North Dakota State Bison (8th title game)
- Semifinalists: Columbus State Cougars (1st Final Four); Western Washington Vikings (1st Final Four)
- Winning coach: Nancy Winstel (1st title)
- MOP: Michelle Cottrell (Northern Kentucky)

The 2000 NCAA Division II women's basketball tournament was the 19th annual tournament hosted by the NCAA to determine the national champion of Division II women's collegiate basketball in the United States.

Northern Kentucky defeated North Dakota State in the championship game, 71–62 (after one overtime), to claim the Norse's first NCAA Division II national title.

The championship rounds were contested in Pine Bluff, Arkansas.

== Regionals ==
=== East - Shippensburg, Pennsylvania ===
Location: Heiges Field House Host: Shippensburg University of Pennsylvania

First round Round of 48; March 9
4	Belmont Abbey	77
5	Slippery Rock	93
3	Millersville	64
6	West Liberty State	63

Regional semifinals Round of 32; March 10
1	Shippensburg	65
5	Slippery Rock	74
3	Millersville	75**
2	Indiana (PA)	73

Regional finals Sweet 16; March 11
5	Slippery Rock	65
3	Millersville	45

=== Great Lakes - Highland Heights, Kentucky ===
Location: Regents Hall Host: Northern Kentucky University

First round Round of 48; March 9
5	Gannon	47
4	Michigan Tech	68
3	Ferris State	77
6	UMSL	90

Regional semifinals Round of 32; March 10
1	Northern Kentucky	60
4	Michigan Tech	59
6	UMSL	73
2	Northern Michigan	97

Regional finals Sweet 16; March 11
1	Northern Kentucky	77
2	Northern Michigan	70

=== North Central - Fargo, North Dakota ===
Location: Bison Sports Arena Host: North Dakota State University

First round Round of 48; March 10
4	Minnesota Duluth	82
5	Northern State (SD)	67
3	Nebraska–Kearney	79
6	Northern Colorado	81

Regional semifinals Round of 32; March 11
1	North Dakota State	77
4	Minnesota Duluth	72
6	Northern Colorado	67
2	North Dakota	82

Regional finals Sweet 16; March 12
1	North Dakota State	92
2	North Dakota	72

=== Northeast - Albany, New York ===
Location: Activities Center Host: College of Saint Rose

First round Round of 48; March 10
4	Assumption	80
5	Pace	74
3	American International	65
6	UMass Lowell	54

Regional semifinals Round of 32; March 11
1	Saint Rose	88
4	Assumption	69
3	American International	59
2	Bentley	68

Regional finals Sweet 16; March 12
1	Saint Rose	82
2	Bentley	72

=== South - Cleveland, Mississippi ===
Location: Walter Sillers Coliseum Host: Delta State University

First round Round of 48; March 9
4	Florida Southern	70*
5	Tampa	68
6	Fort Valley State	69
3	Rollins	79

Regional semifinals Round of 32; March 10
1	Delta State	66
4	Florida Southern	54
3	Rollins	67
2	Arkansas Tech	54

Regional finals Sweet 16; March 11
1	Delta State	74
3	Rollins	44

=== South Atlantic - Clinton, South Carolina ===
Location: Templeton Physical Education Center Host: Presbyterian College

First round Round of 48; March 9
4	Francis Marion	76
5	Lander	66
3	Kennesaw State	77
6	Livingstone	62

Regional semifinals Round of 32; March 10
1	Presbyterian	79
4	Francis Marion	82
3	Kennesaw State	72
2	Columbus State	82

Regional finals Sweet 16; March 11
4	Francis Marion	99
2	Columbus State	101

=== South Central - Emporia, Kansas ===
Location: White Auditorium Host: Emporia State University

First round Round of 48; March 10
5	Central Missouri State	75
4	Missouri Western State	85
6	Southwest Baptist	68
3	West Texas A&M	56

Regional semifinals Round of 32; March 11
1	Emporia State	78
4	Missouri Western	66
6	Southwest Baptist	80
2	Texas A&M–Kingsville	76

Regional finals Sweet 16; March 12
1	Emporia State	96
6	Southwest Baptist	59

=== West - Pomona, California ===
Location: Kellogg Gym Host: California State Polytechnic University, Pomona

First round Round of 48; March 9
5	Montana State Billings	79
4	Seattle Pacific	64
3	Alaska Anchorage	76
6	Central Washington	58

Regional semifinals Round of 32; March 10
1	Cal Poly Pomona	76
5	Montana State Billings	63
3	Alaska Anchorage	59
2	Western Washington	78

Regional finals Sweet 16; March 11
1	Cal Poly Pomona	66
2	Western Washington	84

== Elite Eight - Pine Bluff, Arkansas ==
Location: Pine Bluff Convention Center Host: University of Arkansas at Pine Bluff

National quarterfinals Elite Eight; March 22
SA	Columbus State	76
SC	Emporia State	67
NC	North Dakota State	71
S	Delta State	64
W	Western Washington	84
E	Slippery Rock	67
GL	Northern Kentucky	60
E	Saint Rose	50

National semifinals Final Four; March 23
SA	Columbus State	56
NC	North Dakota State	72
W	Western Washington	74
GL	Northern Kentucky	80

National championship March 25
NC	North Dakota State	62
GL	Northern Kentucky	71*

== All-tournament team ==
- Michelle Cottrell, Northern Kentucky
- Michele Tuchfarber, Northern Kentucky
- Jayne Boeddeker, North Dakota State
- Jayne Even, North Dakota State
- Caroline Boclair, Delta State
- Celeste Hill, Western Washington

== See also ==
- 2000 NCAA Division II men's basketball tournament
- 2000 NCAA Division I women's basketball tournament
- 2000 NCAA Division III women's basketball tournament
- 2000 NAIA Division I women's basketball tournament
- 2000 NAIA Division II women's basketball tournament
