= Kyle Gerdeman =

American college basketball coach

Current position
- Title: Head coach
- Team: Lindenwood
- Conference: Ohio Valley
- Record: 87–117 (.426)

Biographical details
- Born: April 9, 1976 (age 50); Wright City, Missouri
- Education: Southeast Missouri State

Coaching career (HC unless noted)
- 1998–2001: East Central College (assistant)
- 2001–2003: Moberly Area CC (assistant)
- 2004–2006: Mineral Area College (assistant)
- 2006–2009: Moberly CC
- 2009–2012: Southeast Missouri State (assistant)
- 2012–2019: Central Michigan (assistant)
- 2019–present: Lindenwood

Head coaching record
- Overall: 128–166 (.435)

Kyle Gerdeman (born April 9, 1976) is an American basketball coach who is the current head coach of the Lindenwood Lions men's basketball team.

== Coaching career ==
After graduation from Southeast Missouri State, Gerdeman became an assistant coach at East Central College before making stops at Moberly Area Community College and Mineral Area College from 1998 to 2006. He would return to Moberly Area as the head coach in 2006 where he spent three seasons, with a 41–49 overall record.

Gerdeman would enter the Division I coaching ranks with his alma mater Southeast Missouri State for three seasons before joining Keno Davis at Central Michigan, where he stayed the next seven seasons.

On June 26, 2019, Gerdeman was named the head coach at Lindenwood. He would guide the team through its remaining years in the Great Lakes Valley Conference in Division II before the Lions joined the Division I Ohio Valley Conference in 2022.

== Head coaching record ==
=== NCAA ===
Record table
Season	Team	Overall	Conference	Standing	Postseason
Lindenwood Lions (GLVC) (2019–2022)
2019–20	Lindenwood	12–16	6–14	13th	
2020–21	Lindenwood	10–10	10–9	3rd (Central)	
2021–22	Lindenwood	12–17	8–12	4th (Central)	
Lindenwood:		34–43 (.442)	24–35 (.407)		
Lindenwood Lions (OVC) (2022–present)
2022–23	Lindenwood	11–21	6–12	8th	
2023–24	Lindenwood	9–22	3–15	11th	
2024–25	Lindenwood	15–16	10–10	T–5th	
2025–26	Lindenwood	18–15	11–9	6th	
2026–27	Lindenwood	0–0	0–0		
Lindenwood:		53–74 (.417)	30–46 (.395)		
Total:		87–117 (.426)			
National champion Postseason invitational champion Conference regular season champion Conference regular season and conference tournament champion Division regular season champion Division regular season and conference tournament champion Conference tournament champion

=== NJCAA ===
Record table
Season	Team	Overall	Conference	Standing	Postseason
Moberly Area CC (Region XVI) (2006–2009)
2006–07	Moberly Area CC	17–13	N/A	N/A	
2007–08	Moberly Area CC	15–14	N/A	N/A	
2008–09	Moberly Area CC	9–22	N/A	N/A	
Moberly Area CC:		41–49 (.456)			
Total:		41–49 (.456)			
National champion Postseason invitational champion Conference regular season champion Conference regular season and conference tournament champion Division regular season champion Division regular season and conference tournament champion Conference tournament champion
