= 2000 NAIA Division I men's basketball tournament =

College basketball tournament

- Teams: 32
- Finals site: Tulsa Convention Center; Tulsa, Oklahoma
- Champions: Life (3rd title)
- Runner-up: Georgetown (KY) (4th title game)
- Semifinalists: Biola (2nd Final Four); Olivet Nazarene (1st Final Four)
- Coach of the year: Roger Kaiser (Life)
- Player of the year: Jimmie Hunter (Life)
- Charles Stevenson Hustle Award: Marcus White (Biola)
- Chuck Taylor MVP: Jimmie Hunter (Life)
- Attendance: 19,565
- Top scorer: Will Carlton (Georgetown (KY)) (100 points)

The 63rd NAIA Men's Division I Basketball Tournament was held in March at the Tulsa Convention Center in Tulsa, Oklahoma. The 63rd annual NAIA basketball tournament featured 32 teams playing in a single-elimination format. The championship game featured Life University and Georgetown College. Life would defeat Georgetown by a score of 63 to 59.

== Awards and honors ==
- Leading scorer: Will Carlton, Georgetown (Ky.); 5 games, 37 field goals, 21 free throws, 100 total points (20.0 average points per game)
- Leading rebounder: Will Carlton, Georgetown (Ky.); 5 games, 57 total rebounds (11.4 average rebounds per game)
- Most consecutive tournament appearances: 9th, Georgetown (Ky.)
- Most tournament appearances: Georgetown (Ky.), 19th of 28, appearances to the NAIA Tournament.

== 2000 NAIA bracket ==
First round	Second round
1	Life	106
-	Southern–New Orleans	63
1	Life	90
16	Southern Tech	65
-	Point Loma Nazarene	65
16	Southern Poly	74
TOP TIER
9	Houston Baptist	68
-	Barber–Scotia	50
9	Houston Baptist	61
8	The Master's	81
-	Campbellsville	76
8	The Master's	78
5	Oklahoma City	70
-	Westmont	62
5	Oklahoma City	67
12	Spring Hill	77
-	Saint Vincent	47
12	Spring Hill	51
TOP TIER
13	Columbia (MO)	59
-	Olivet Nazarene	62
-	Olivet Nazarene	79
-	Lewis-Clark State	61
-	Lewis–Clark State	79
4	Birmingham–Southern	61
3	Georgetown (KY)	89
-	Northwestern Oklahoma State	63
3	Georgetown	66
14	Union	64*
-	College of West Virginia	67
14	Union (TN)	73
BOTTOM TIER
11	Lindsey Wilson	52
-	Mobile	51
11	Lindsey Wilson	79*
-	Faulkner	81
-	Faulkner	97
6	Azusa Pacific	73
7	Lambuth	64
-	Brewton–Parker	59
7	Lambuth	60
10	Biola	71
-	St. Xavier	78
10	Biola	92
BOTTOM TIER
15	Central State	88
-	McKendree	79
15	Central State	41
2	Lipscomb	77
-	St. Gregory's	66
2	Lipscomb	77

Elite Eight
1	Life	79
8	The Master’s	68
12	Spring Hill	44
-	Olivet Nazarene	62
3	Georgetown	80
-	Faulkner	61
10	Biola	82
2	Lipscomb	71

NAIA national semifinals
1	Life	85
-	Olivet Nazarene	69
3	Georgetown	118
10	Biola	108****

NAIA national championship
1	Life	61
3	Georgetown	59

- * denotes each overtime.

== See also ==
- 2000 NAIA Division I women's basketball tournament
- 2000 NCAA Division I men's basketball tournament
- 2000 NCAA Division II men's basketball tournament
- 2000 NCAA Division III men's basketball tournament
- 2000 NAIA Division II men's basketball tournament
