= 2000 NCAA Division III women's basketball tournament =

2000 Women's sporting event

- Teams: 49
- Finals site: O'Neill Center, Danbury, Connecticut
- Champions: Washington University Bears (3rd title)
- Runner-up: Southern Maine Huskies (2nd title game)
- Third place: St. Thomas Tommies (4th Final Four)
- Fourth place: Scranton Royals (6th Final Four)
- Winning coach: Nancy Fahey (3rd title)
- MOP: Alia Fischer (Washington University in St. Louis)
- Attendance: 30,465

The 2000 NCAA Division III women's basketball tournament was the 19th annual tournament hosted by the NCAA to determine the national champion of Division III women's collegiate basketball in the United States.

Two-time defending champions Washington St. Louis defeated Southern Maine in the championship game, 79–33, to claim the Bears' third Division III national title, their third of four consecutive.

The championship rounds were hosted by Western Connecticut State University at the O'Neill Center in Danbury, Connecticut from March 17–18, 2000.

== Bracket ==
- An asterisk by a score indicates an overtime period

=== Top left sectional ===
First round March 1, 2000	Second round March 4, 2000
Allentown	54
King's (PA)	62
Johns Hopkins	57
King's (PA)	60
Mid-Atlantic Region
Messiah	71
Bethany (WV)	66
Messiah	43
Scranton	67
Cortland State	55
St. John Fisher	66
St. John Fisher	66
Mount St. Mary (NY)	55
East Region
William Smith	78
Gwynedd Mercy	52
William Smith	43
St. Lawrence	49

Sectional semifinals March 10, 2000
King's (PA)	45
Scranton	49
St. John Fisher	62
St. Lawrence*	67

Sectional finals March 11, 2000
Scranton	72
St. Lawrence	59

=== Bottom left sectional ===
First round March 1, 2000	Second round March 4, 2000
Baldwin Wallace	77
Wilmington (OH)	72
Wilmington (OH)	46
Kenyon	64
Great Lakes Region
Calvin	68
Lake Forest	42
Calvin	64
Capital	63
Washington St. Louis	67
Wisconsin–Oshkosh	46
Wisconsin Lutheran	38
Wisconsin–Oshkosh	54
Central Region
Millikin	77
Fontbonne	54
Millikin	38
Wisconsin–Eau Claire	75

Sectional semifinals March 10, 2000
Baldwin Wallace	76**
Calvin	72
Washington St. Louis	81
Wisconsin–Eau Claire	63

Sectional finals March 11, 2000
Baldwin Wallace	71
Washington St. Louis	86

=== Top right sectional ===
First round March 1, 2000	Second round March 4, 2000
Bates	59
Clark (MA)	63
Clark (MA)	63
Norwich	58
Northeast Region
Salem State	55
Wellesley	48
Salem State	68
Southern Maine	72
Rowan	87
Salisbury State	73
Salisbury State	80
Staten Island	63
Atlantic Region
Richard Stockton	80
Centenary (NJ)	45
Richard Stockton	63
Eastern Nazarene	66

Sectional semifinals March 10, 2000
Clark (MA)	61
Southern Maine	77
Rowan	70
Eastern Nazarene	44

Sectional finals March 11, 2000
Southern Maine	65
Rowan	62

=== Bottom right sectional ===
First round March 1, 2000	Second round March 4, 2000
St. Thomas (MN)	64
Pacific Lutheran	45
Pacific Lutheran	50
Whitworth	46
West Region
George Fox	63
Linfield	51
George Fox	71
Cal Lutheran	63
Cal Lutheran	72
UC San Diego	66
McMurry	62
Simpson (CA)	47
McMurry	70
Hendrix	59
Hendrix	56
Maryville (TN)	44
South Region
Roanoke	69
Shenandoah	55
Roanoke	76
Hardin-Simmons	101

Sectional semifinals March 10, 2000
St. Thomas (MN)	76
George Fox	64
McMurry	60
Hardin-Simmons	62

Sectional finals March 11, 2000
St. Thomas (MN)	68
Hardin-Simmons	56

=== Final Four ===
Final Four; March 17, 2000; O'Neill Center; Danbury, CT
Scranton	30
Washington St. Louis	64
Southern Maine	49
St. Thomas (MN)	42

National championship March 18, 2000; O'Neill Center; Danbury, CT
Washington St. Louis	79
Southern Maine	33
Third place
Scranton	56
St. Thomas (MN)	66

== All-tournament team ==
- Alia Fischer, Washington University in St. Louis
- Tasha Rodgers, Washington University in St. Louis
- Trish Ripton, Southern Maine
- Jennifer Ulstad, St. Thomas (MN)
- Kelly Halpin, Scranton

== See also ==
- 2000 NCAA Division I women's basketball tournament
- 2000 NCAA Division II women's basketball tournament
- 2000 NAIA Division I women's basketball tournament
- 2000 NAIA Division II women's basketball tournament
- 2000 NCAA Division III men's basketball tournament
