= Oral Roberts Golden Eagles women's basketball =

Oral Roberts Golden Eagles
2026–27 Oral Roberts Golden Eagles women's basketball team
- University: Oral Roberts University
- Head coach: Cophie Anderson (2nd season)
- Location: Tulsa, Oklahoma
- Arena: Mabee Center (capacity: 10,575)
- Conference: Summit League
- Nickname: Golden Eagles
- Colors: Navy blue, Vegas gold, and white

NCAA Division I tournament appearances
- 1999, 2001, 2005, 2007, 2008, 2013

Conference tournament champions
- 1999, 2001, 2005, 2007 (Mid-Con); 2008 (Summit); 2013 (Southland)

Conference regular-season champions
- 2010, 2011, 2013

Uniforms
Home	Away

The Oral Roberts Golden Eagles women's basketball team is the basketball team of Oral Roberts University in Tulsa, Oklahoma. The team is a member of The Summit League.

== History ==
As of the end of the 2020–21 season, the Golden Eagles have a 708–651 all-time record. They participated in the Mid-Con from 1997–2007, the Summit League from 2007–2012, the Southland Conference from 2012–2014 before joining the Summit League again in 2014. They also made the WNIT in 2010, 2011, and 2012 along with the WBI in 2015.

== NCAA tournament results ==
Year	Seed	Round	Opponent	Result
1999	16	First round	(1) Purdue	L 48−68
2001	15	First round	(2) Oklahoma	L 64−70
2005	14	First round	(3) Texas	L 58−63
2007	15	First round	(2) Purdue	L 42−63
2008	#16	First round	(1) Tennessee	L 55−94
2013	#15	First round	(2) Tennessee	L 62−83

== Season–by–season results ==
Record table
Season	Coach	Overall	Conference	Standing	Postseason
Independent (Division I) (1975–1983)
1975–76	Peggy Beck	18-4	—	—	—
1976-77	Peggy Beck	25-9	—	—	—
Peggy Beck:		43–13	—		
1977-78	Dixie Woodall	31-4	—	—	AIAW State Champion
1978-79	Dixie Woodall	25-10	—	—	AIAW State Champion
1979-80	Dixie Woodall	22-8	—	—	AIAW State Champion
1980–81	Dixie Woodall	18–11	—	—	AIAW State Champion
Dixie Woodall:		96–33	—		
1981-82	Debbie Yow	14-10	—	—	—
1982-83	Debbie Yow	26-1	—	—	NWIT Third Place
Debbie Yow:		40–11	—		
Oil Country Athletic Conference (Division I) (1983–1985)
1983-84	Don Calvert	15-13	7-3	2nd	—
1984-85	Don Calvert	9-21	4-6	4th	—
Independent (Division I) (1985–1986)
1985-86	Don Calvert	17-11	—	—	—
Don Calvert:		41–45	11–9		
Midwestern Collegiate Conference (Division I) (1986–1987)
1986-87	Rhonda Penquite	16-12	9-3	2nd	—
Independent (Division I) (1987–1997)
1987-88	Rhonda Penquite	13-14	—	—	—
1988-89	Rhonda Penquite	5-22	—	—	—
Rhonda Penquite:		34–48	9–3		
1989-90	Ken Trickey Jr.	2-38	—	—	—
1990-91	Ken Trickey Jr.	15-18	—	—	NAIA District First round
1991-92	Ken Trickey Jr.	6-22	—	—	—
1992-93	Ken Trickey Jr.	1-25	—	—	—
Ken Trickey Jr.:		24–103	—		
1993-94	Cletus Green	3-24	—	—	—
Cletus Green:		3–24	—		
1994-95	Rick Napier	15-12	—	—	—
1995-96	Rick Napier	10-17	—	—	—
Rick Napier:		25–29	—		
1996-97	Jerry Finkbeiner	13-14	—	—	—
Mid-Continent Conference (Division I) (1997–2007)
1997-98	Jerry Finkbeiner	7-20	7-9	6th	—
1998-99	Jerry Finkbeiner	17-13	8-6	T–3rd	NCAA first round
1999-00	Jerry Finkbeiner	12-16	8-8	5th	—
2000-01	Jerry Finkbeiner	20-11	11-5	T–2nd	NCAA first round
2001-02	Jerry Finkbeiner	13-16	6-8	T–4th	—
2002-03	Jerry Finkbeiner	18-10	7-7	T–5th	—
2003-04	Jerry Finkbeiner	17-13	9-7	T–5th	—
2004-05	Jerry Finkbeiner	22-9	10-6	4th	NCAA first round
2005-06	Jerry Finkbeiner	16-12	10-6	3rd	—
2006-07	Jerry Finkbeiner	22-11	8-6	3rd	NCAA first round
Summit League (Division I) (2007–2012)
2007-08	Jerry Finkbeiner	19-14	10-8	6th	NCAA first round
2008-09	Jerry Finkbeiner	11-17 (Note: Due to Summit League sanctions Oral Roberts vacated the records of two games in 2008-09.)	6-10	8th	—
2009-10	Jerry Finkbeiner	23-10	15-3	1st	WNIT first round
2010-11	Jerry Finkbeiner	23-11	16-2	1st	WNIT third round
2011-12	Jerry Finkbeiner	20-11	14-4	2nd	WNIT first round
Jerry Finkbeiner:		273–208	145–95		
Southland Conference (Division I) (2012–2014)
2012-13	Misti Cussen	18-13	13-5	1st	NCAA first round
2013-14	Misti Cussen	9-20	8-10	T–8th	—
Summit League (Division I) (2014–present)
2014-15	Misti Cussen	18-16	9-7	T–3rd	WBI semifinals
2015-16	Misti Cussen	14-16	10-6	4th	—
2016-17	Misti Cussen	15-15	7-9	6th	—
2017-18	Misti Cussen	17-13	7-7	T–4th	—
2018-19	Misti Cussen	18-13	10-6	T–3rd	—
2019-20	Misti Cussen	15-16	9-7	T–3rd	—
2020-21	Misti Cussen	6-15	4-8	T–7th	—
2021-22	Misti Cussen	16-15	10-8	4th	—
Misti Cussen:		146-152	87-73		
2022-23	Kelsi Musick	12-19	8-10	T–5th	—
Kelsi Musick:		12-19	8-10		
Total:		737-685			
National champion Postseason invitational champion Conference regular season champion Conference regular season and conference tournament champion Division regular season champion Division regular season and conference tournament champion Conference tournament champion
