= Debbie Yow =

American college sports administrator

Biographical details
- Born: September 1, 1950 (age 76); Gibsonville, North Carolina, U.S.
- Education: Elon University

Playing career
- 1971–1974: Elon

Coaching career (HC unless noted)
- 1976–1980: Kentucky
- 1981–1983: Oral Roberts
- 1983–1985: Florida

Administrative career (AD unless noted)
- 1990–1994: Saint Louis
- 1994–2010: Maryland
- 2010–2019: NC State

Head coaching record
- Overall: 160–69 (.699)

Deborah Ann Yow (born September 1, 1950) is an American college sports administrator and former college basketball coach. She was the director of athletics at North Carolina State University, and held the same position at the University of Maryland and Saint Louis University. She previously served as the head coach of the women's basketball teams of the University of Kentucky, Oral Roberts University, and the University of Florida.

== Early life ==
A native of Gibsonville, North Carolina, Yow attended East Carolina University but later dropped out. She then attended Elon University, where she studied English and played basketball under the leadership of her sister Kay Yow, who served as Head Coach throughout all of Debbie’s collegiate years. In 1987, Yow earned a master's degree from Liberty University in counseling. Yow married and later divorced Lynn Nance, a collegiate men's basketball coach. In 1983, Yow married Dr. William Bowden, a university administrator, while she was coaching at Oral Roberts University.

== Women's basketball coach ==
Yow coached women's basketball at the University of Kentucky and Oral Roberts University, and also served as the women's basketball coach at the University of Florida where she took these three previously unranked teams into the top 20 national rankings. On January 10, 1985, she and the Gators won Yow's 150th career victory. After that season, Yow accepted a promotion in Gator athletics as an administrator and fundraiser. She averaged 20 wins per season over eight years as a head coach.

== Athletic director ==
=== Saint Louis ===
After coaching, Yow also served as an associate athletic director at the University of North Carolina-Greensboro. Saint Louis University hired Yow as its athletic director in August 1990. The media reported a strained relationship between her and the men's basketball coach Rich Grawer, which Yow denied. She fired Grawer after a 5–23 season and hired Charlie Spoonhour as his replacement. Spoonhour won the Henry Iba Coach of the Year Award for leading Saint Louis to the NCAA Tournament in the 1993–94 season and received a pay raise and contract extension through 2000. Yow remained at Saint Louis University for four years, until hired to the same position at the University of Maryland in August 1994.

=== Maryland ===
At Maryland, Yow became the first female athletic director at any Atlantic Coast Conference school. Under Yow, the Maryland athletics department balanced its annual budgets, which had not been done in the previous decade and the department's debt was reduced from $51 million to $5.6 million. From 1994 to 2010, the school's athletic teams captured twenty national championships. Seventeen were in women's sports: women's lacrosse (8), field hockey (4), competitive cheer (4), and women's basketball (1). Three championships were claimed by two men's teams. Maryland men's basketball secured the 2002 title and men's soccer captured the 2005 and 2008 College Cups. U.S. News & World Report and Sports Illustrated ranked the Maryland athletics program in the nation's top 20 during Yow's tenure. In 2008, her salary was $365,925.00 according to public records.

Yow reportedly had a rocky relationship with Maryland men's basketball coach Gary Williams. In January 2009, the basketball team struggled early in its season, which led to Williams publicly trading barbs about recruiting with associate athletic director Kathy Worthington. In February, Yow issued a statement of support for Williams. During the 2009 row, John Feinstein wrote in The Washington Post, "Debbie Yow didn't hire Gary Williams. She can't take any credit for the program he built nor should she take any of the blame for its recent struggles." He added, "Does [Williams] get along with Debbie Yow? No, everyone knows that..."

=== North Carolina State ===
On June 25, 2010, Yow accepted the job as athletic director at North Carolina State University. She was awarded a five-year contract with a $350,000 annual salary with a supplemental income of $100,000.

After the 2010–11 basketball season, Sidney Lowe resigned as Wolfpack coach after failing to make the NCAA tournament in his five seasons as coach. In early April 2011, Yow hired former Alabama coach Mark Gottfried as the new coach. In his first season, Coach Gottfried led the Wolfpack back to the Sweet 16 in the NCAA Tournament.

On November 25, 2012, Tom O'Brien was terminated, and NC State was obligated to pay $1.2 million of non-state funds to O'Brien as his contract ran through the 2015 season. However, NC State ended up only having to pay O'Brien $200,000 after the buyout was renegotiated so he could become an assistant at Virginia.

On December 1, 2012, Dave Doeren was announced as the new head coach of the NC State Wolfpack football team, with an estimated total annual compensation package of $1.9 million. It was the seventh change of a head coach at NC State under Yow in a little over two years. On March 17, 2017, Kevin Keatts was announced as the new head coach of the NC State Wolfpack basketball team.

Yow was named the 2019 James J. Corbett Memorial Award Recipient by the National Association of Collegiate Directors of Athletics, the highest honor one can achieve in college athletics administration.

Yow retired on May 1, 2019. Boo Corrigan took over as NC State Athletics Director on the same day.

== Head coaching record ==
Record table
Season	Team	Overall	Conference	Standing	Postseason
Kentucky Wildcats () (1976–1980)
1976–77	Kentucky	19–7			
1977–78	Kentucky	23–12			
1978–79	Kentucky	13–16			
1979–80	Kentucky	24–5			
Kentucky:		79–40 (.664)			
Oral Roberts Titans () (1981–1983)
1981–82	Oral Roberts	14–10			
1982–83	Oral Roberts	26–1			
Oral Roberts:		40–11 (.784)			
Florida Gators (Southeastern Conference) (1983–1985)
1983–84	Florida	19–9	2–6	5th (East)	
1984–85	Florida	22–9	4–4	T–2nd (East)	
Florida:		41–18 (.695)	6–10 (.375)		
Total:		160–69 (.699)			
National champion Postseason invitational champion Conference regular season champion Conference regular season and conference tournament champion Division regular season champion Division regular season and conference tournament champion Conference tournament champion

== Personal life ==
Yow's two sisters also have been employed in athletics. Kay Yow was head coach of the NC State women's basketball team, and Susan Yow became the first female All American at NC State in 1975-76. Susan went on to coach women's basketball at multiple schools, with her last stop at Queens University in Charlotte, NC before retiring. Her brother, Ron, signed a football scholarship at Clemson University in 1967 and played there for two years. Her cousin, Virgil Yow, served as head basketball coach at High Point University, where he allowed the first female to play on the men's team. All three of the Yow sisters, along with Virgil Yow, have been inducted into the State of North Carolina Sports Hall of Fame.
