= 2000 NCAA Division II men's basketball tournament =

- Teams: 48
- Finals site: Commonwealth Convention Center, Louisville, Kentucky
- Champions: Metro State (1st title)
- Runner-up: Kentucky Wesleyan (10th title game)
- Semifinalists: Missouri Southern (1st Final Four); Seattle Pacific (5th Final Four)
- Winning coach: Mike Dunlap (1st title)
- MOP: DeMarcos Anzures (Metro State)

The 2000 NCAA Division II men's basketball tournament was the 44th annual single-elimination tournament to determine the national champion of men's NCAA Division II college basketball in the United States.

Officially culminating the 1999–2000 NCAA Division II men's basketball season, the tournament featured forty-eight teams from around the country.

The Elite Eight, national semifinals, and championship were again played at the Commonwealth Convention Center in Louisville, Kentucky.

In a rematch of the previous year's final, Metro State (33–4) defeated defending champions Kentucky Wesleyan, 97–79, to win their first Division II national championship.

The Roadrunners were coached by Mike Dunlap. Metro State's DeMarcos Anzures was the Most Outstanding Player.

2000 NCAA Division II Men's sites - regionals (cyan) Elite Eight (red)

== Regionals ==
=== South - Lakeland, Florida ===
Location: Jenkins Field House Host: Florida Southern College

First round Round of 48; March 10
4	Delta State	67
5	Henderson State	64
3	Alabama–Huntsville	88
6	LeMoyne–Owen	71

Regional semifinals Round of 32; March 11
1	Florida Southern	81
4	Delta State	55
2	Tampa	64
3	Alabama–Huntsville	55

Regional final Sweet 16; March 12
1	Florida Southern	67
2	Tampa	53

=== South Central - Joplin, Missouri ===
Location: Leggett & Platt Athletic Center Host: Missouri Southern State University

First round Round of 48; March 9
4	Drury	74
5	Washburn	82
3	Northeastern State	60
6	Northwest Missouri State	56

Regional semifinals Round of 32; March 10
1	Missouri Southern	79
5	Washburn	73
2	Midwestern State	91
3	Northeastern State	88

Regional final Sweet 16; March 11
1	Missouri Southern	92
2	Midwestern State	83

=== Northeast - New Haven, Connecticut ===
Location: James Moore Fieldhouse Host: Southern Connecticut State University

First round Round of 48; March 9
4	American International	85
5	Saint Anselm	93
3	Merrimack	92
6	Saint Rose	64

Regional semifinals Round of 32; March 10
1	Southern Connecticut State	70
5	Saint Anselm	83
2	Adelphi	90
3	Merrimack	64

Regional final Sweet 16; March 11
5	Saint Anselm	76
2	Adelphi	72

=== North Central - Denver, Colorado ===
Location: Auraria Events Center Host: Metropolitan State University

First round Round of 48; March 9
4	South Dakota State	67
5	North Dakota	73
3	Wayne State (NE)	90
6	St. Cloud State	80

Regional semifinals Round of 32; March 10
1	Metro State	82
5	North Dakota	58
2	South Dakota	73
3	Wayne State (NE)	76

Regional final Sweet 16; March 11
1	Metro State	86
3	Wayne State (NE)	72

=== East - Charleston, West Virginia ===
Location: Eddie King Gymnasium Host: University of Charleston

First round Round of 48; March 9
4	Fairmont State	73
5	Indiana (PA)	79
3	Salem-Teikyo	74
6	Saint Andrews Presbyterian	65

Regional semifinals Round of 32; March 10
1	Charleston	81
5	Indiana (PA)	108
2	Pfeiffer	99
3	Salem-Teikyo	95

Regional final Sweet 16; March 11
5	Indiana (PA)	104
2	Pfeiffer	71

=== Great Lakes - Owensboro, Kentucky ===
Location: Sportscenter Host: Kentucky Wesleyan College

First round Round of 48; March 10
4	Northern Kentucky	89
5	Northern Michigan	57
3	Gannon	86
6	Michigan Tech	91

Regional semifinals Round of 32; March 11
1	Kentucky Wesleyan	66
4	Northern Kentucky	62
2	Southern Indiana	85
6	Michigan Tech	68

Regional final Sweet 16; March 12
1	Kentucky Wesleyan	88
2	Southern Indiana	79

=== South Atlantic - Wingate, North Carolina ===
Location: Cuddy Arena Host: Wingate University

First round Round of 48; March 9
4	Gardner–Webb	81
5	Georgia College	92
3	Virginia Union	60
6	Columbus State	80

Regional semifinals Round of 32; March 10
1	Winston-Salem State	68
5	Georgia College	72
2	Wingate	57
6	Columbus State	67

Regional final Sweet 16; March 11
5	Georgia College	68
6	Columbus State	62

=== West - Seattle, Washington ===
Location: Royal Brougham Pavilion Host: Seattle Pacific University

First round Round of 48; March 9
4	Cal Davis	60
5	BYU–Hawaii	53
3	Cal State San Bernardino	61
6	Cal State Los Angeles	54

Regional semifinals Round of 32; March 10
1	Seattle Pacific	68
4	Cal Davis	61
2	Central Washington	101
3	Cal State San Bernardino	88

Regional final Sweet 16; March 11
1	Seattle Pacific	85
2	Central Washington	72

== Elite Eight - Louisville, Kentucky ==
Location: Commonwealth Convention Center Host: Bellarmine College

National Quarterfinals; Elite Eight; March 22
SC	Missouri Southern	76
S	Florida Southern	65
NC	Metro State	81
NE	Saint Anselm	61
Louisville, Kentucky
W	Seattle Pacific	77
SA	Georgia College	65
GL	Kentucky Wesleyan	84
E	Indiana (PA)	68

National semifinals Final Four; March 23
SC	Missouri Southern	74
NC	Metro State	75
W	Seattle Pacific	81
GL	Kentucky Wesleyan	87*

National championship March 25
NC	Metro State	97
GL	Kentucky Wesleyan	79

== All-tournament team ==
- DeMarcos Anzures, Metro State (MOP)
- Kane Oakley, Metro State
- John Bynum, Metro State
- Lee Barlow, Metro State
- Lorico Duncan, Kentucky Wesleyan

== See also ==
- 2000 NCAA Division II women's basketball tournament
- 2000 NCAA Division I men's basketball tournament
- 2000 NCAA Division III men's basketball tournament
- 2000 NAIA Division I men's basketball tournament
- 2000 NAIA Division II men's basketball tournament
