= The William A. O'Neill Athletic & Convocation Center =

Multi-purpose arena in Connecticut, United States

Coordinates: 41°23′45″N 73°29′39″W

- Interactive map of The William A. O'Neill Athletic & Convocation Center
- Location: 43 Lake Avenue Extension, Danbury, Connecticut, USA
- Owner: Western Connecticut State University

Construction
- Opened: 1995

Tenant
- Western Connecticut Wolves

The William O'Neill Athletic and Convocation Center (O'Neill Center) is an 80,000-square-foot (7,400 m^{2}) multi-purpose athletic complex, at Western Connecticut State University, in Danbury, Connecticut.

Named after William O'Neill, the O'Neill Center was completed in 1995 and has since been home to WestConn's basketball and volleyball teams.

The 4,500-seat arena can also be used for concerts, shows, and other public events.

== Events ==
Bob Dylan kicked off his Paradise Lost Tour at the arena on December 7, 1995.

The arena hosted the final rounds of the NCAA Division III women's basketball tournament in 1999, 2000, and 2001.

== Main facilities ==
The O'Neill Center is home to the athletics offices, a weight room, a swimming pool, and the Feldman Arena where games are played.
