= 2000 NCAA Division III men's basketball tournament =

American collegiate men's basketball tournament (2000)

- Teams: 48
- Finals site: , Salem, Virginia
- Champions: Calvin (2nd title)
- Runner-up: Wisconsin–Eau Claire (1st title game)
- Semifinalists: Salem State (1st Final Four); Franklin & Marshall (4th Final Four)
- Winning coach: Kevin Vande Streek (Calvin)
- MOP: Sherm Carstensen (Wisconsin-Eau Claire)
- Attendance: 52,847

The 2000 NCAA Division III men's basketball tournament was the 26th annual single-elimination tournament to determine the national champions of National Collegiate Athletic Association (NCAA) men's Division III collegiate basketball in the United States.

The field contained forty-eight teams, and each program was allocated to one of four sectionals. All sectional games were played on campus sites, while the national semifinals, third-place final, and championship finals were contested at the Salem Civic Center in Salem, Virginia.

Calvin defeated Wisconsin–Eau Claire, 79–74, in the championship, clinching a second national title.

The Knights (31–1) were coached by Kevin Vande Streek. Calvin's prior championship came in 1992.

Sherm Carstensen of Wisconsin-Eau Claire was named Most Outstanding Player after scoring 34 points in the semifinal and 36 in the championship game.

== Bracket ==
=== Top left sectional ===
First round
Springfield	80
Eastern Connecticut	75
Amherst	79
Western New England	77
Penn State Behrend	64
Alvernia	60
Hamilton	85
Endicott	68

Second round
Williams	74
Springfield	75
Amherst	75
Salem State	81
RIT	65
Penn State Behrend	80
Hamilton	55
Cortland State	60

Sectional semifinals
Springfield	69
Salem State	70
Penn State Behrend	58
Cortland State	52

Sectional finals
Salem State	75
Penn State Behrend	69

=== Bottom left sectional ===
First round
St. Thomas (MN)	80
Nebraska Wesleyan	58
UW–Eau Claire	72
Concordia (WI)	54
Lewis & Clark	77
Pacific (OR)	75
Ripon	58
St. John's (MN)	55

Second round
Buena Vista	69
St. Thomas (MN)	66
UW–Eau Claire	74
Carthage	62
UW–Stevens Point	72
Lewis & Clark	68
Ripon	68
Chicago	75

Sectional semifinals
Buena Vista	75
UW–Eau Claire	82*
UW–Stevens Point	63
Chicago	49

Sectional finals
UW–Eau Claire	60
UW–Stevens Point	58

=== Top right sectional ===
First round
Trinity (TX)	62
Pomona–Pitzer	65
Maryville (TN)	69
SCAD	54
Ohio Northern	74
Benedictine (IL)	66
Franklin	81
Webster	50

Second round
McMurry	111
Pomona–Pitzer	76
Maryville (TN)	76
Hampden–Sydney	75
Wooster	82
Ohio Northern	71
Franklin	90
Calvin	92*

Sectional semifinals
McMurry	112
Maryville (TN)	95
Wooster	53
Calvin	82

Sectional finals
McMurry	79
Calvin	115

=== Bottom right sectional ===
First round
Scranton	78
Mount St. Mary (NY)	66
Christopher Newport	68
Mississippi College	61
Roanoke	83*
Marymount	72
Franklin & Marshall	69
Baruch	46

Second round
William Paterson	60
Scranton	58
Christopher Newport	64
Catholic	65
Rowan	80
Roanoke	74
Franklin & Marshall	65
Widener	62

Sectional semifinals
William Paterson	52
Catholic	57
Rowan	72
Franklin & Marshall	76

Sectional finals
Catholic	74
Franklin & Marshall	85

=== National finals ===
- Site: Salem Civic Center, Salem, Virginia

National semifinals
Salem State	42
UW–Eau Claire	70
Calvin	79
Franklin & Marshall	77

National championship
UW–Eau Claire	74
Calvin	79
National third-place
Salem State	79
Franklin & Marshall	75

== See also ==
- 2000 NCAA Division I men's basketball tournament
- 2000 NCAA Division II men's basketball tournament
- 2000 NCAA Division III women's basketball tournament
- 2000 NAIA Division I men's basketball tournament
