= Kelsi Musick =

American basketball coach

Current position
- Title: Head coach
- Team: Arkansas
- Conference: SEC
- Record: 12–20 (.375)
- Annual salary: $600,000

Biographical details
- Born: January 28, 1980 (age 46); Canton, Oklahoma, U.S.

Playing career
- 1998–2002: Cameron

Coaching career (HC unless noted)
- 2004–2006: Canton HS
- 2008–2009: Fresno State (assistant)
- 2009–2022: Southwestern Oklahoma State
- 2022–2025: Oral Roberts
- 2025–present: Arkansas

Head coaching record
- Overall: 328–184 (.641) (NCAA)

Accomplishments and honors

Championships
- 1 Division II Runner-Up (2019); 4 Great American Conference (GAC) Tournament championships (2012, 2014, 2019, 2022); 3 GAC regular season championships (2018, 2019, 2022); 1 GAC Western Division championship (2021)

Awards
- 5 GAC women's basketball Coach of the Year awards

Kelsi Musick (born January 28, 1980) is an American basketball coach and former player who is the current head coach of the Arkansas Razorbacks women's basketball team. Musick and her husband, Josh, have three children – sons, Maddox and Titus, and one daughter, Amaria.

== Early life and playing career ==
Musick was born and grew up in Canton, Oklahoma, where she graduated from Canton High School. Musick went on to attend Cameron University, graduating in 2002, after four-years playing for the Aggies women's basketball team. She set school records for career three-point shooting percentage and assists. As a senior, she helped lead the Aggies to a school record 25 wins, a Lone Star Conference championship, and the program’s first-ever appearance in the NCAA Tournament. She was inducted into the Cameron University Athletics Hall of Fame in February 2025.

== Coaching career ==
Musick was the head coach of the Southwestern Oklahoma State Bulldogs for thirteen seasons, from 2010 to 2022. During her tenure at the Division II school, she coached her team to a Great American Conference (GAC) division title in 2021 (the only year the conference had divisions), three GAC regular season championships (2018, 2019, 2022), four GAC Tournament championships (2012, 2014, 2019, 2022), six appearances in the NCAA Division II tournament, and a national runner-up finish in 2019. She was named the GAC coach of the year five times.

Musick then accepted the head coaching position at Oral Roberts and would coach the lady Golden Eagles for three seasons, from 2023 to 2025. Her teams improved every year she was at ORU, and they made post-season appearances in the WNIT in 2024 and the WBIT in 2025.

On March 24, 2025, Musick was hired as the 10th women's basketball head coach in University of Arkansas program history.

=== 2025-26 ===
Musick's first season at Arkansas began with an exhibition victory over the UA-Fort Smith Lions, 100-42, on October 30 in Fayetteville. The overall season did not go well, as Arkansas only won 12 games and finished 1-15 in conference play.

== Head coaching record ==
Record table
Season	Team	Overall	Conference	Standing	Postseason
Southwestern Oklahoma State Bulldogs (Lone Star Conference) (2009–2011)
2009–10	Southwestern Oklahoma State	3–24	3–11	7th (North)	
2010–11	Southwestern Oklahoma State	12–14	4–10	6th (North)	
Southwestern Oklahoma State Bulldogs (Great American Conference) (2011–2022)
2011–12	Southwestern Oklahoma State	20–9	12–4	2nd	
2012–13	Southwestern Oklahoma State	24–7	16–4	2nd	NCAA Division II Regional Semifinals
2013–14	Southwestern Oklahoma State	19–11	13–7	3rd	NCAA Division II First Round
2014–15	Southwestern Oklahoma State	12–15	9–11	T-6th	
2015–16	Southwestern Oklahoma State	20–11	14–8	3rd	
2016–17	Southwestern Oklahoma State	20–10	15–7	3rd	
2017–18	Southwestern Oklahoma State	26–5	20–2	1st	NCAA Division II First Round
2018–19	Southwestern Oklahoma State	35–2	22–0	1st	NCAA Division II Runner-Up
2019–20	Southwestern Oklahoma State	21–8	16–6	3rd	Cancelled due to Covid-19
2020–21	Southwestern Oklahoma State	18–4	16–2	1st (Western)	NCAA Division II Regional Semifinals
2021–22	Southwestern Oklahoma State	29–5	20–2	1st	NCAA Division II First Round
Southwestern Oklahoma State:		259–125 (.674)	180–74 (.709)		
Oral Roberts Golden Eagles (Summit League) (2022–2025)
2022–23	Oral Roberts	12–19	8–10	T-5th	
2023–24	Oral Roberts	21–11	11–5	3rd	WNIT First Round
2024–25	Oral Roberts	24–9	12–4	2nd	WBIT First Round
Oral Roberts:		57–39 (.594)	31–19 (.620)		
Arkansas Razorbacks (Southeastern Conference) (2025–present)
2025–26	Arkansas	12–20	1–15	16th	
Arkansas:		12–20 (.375)	1–15 (.063)		
Total:		328–184 (.641)			
National champion Postseason invitational champion Conference regular season champion Conference regular season and conference tournament champion Division regular season champion Division regular season and conference tournament champion Conference tournament champion
