= St. Thomas Tommies (Minnesota) women's basketball =

St. Thomas (Minnesota) Tommies women's basketball
2026–27 St. Thomas (Minnesota) Tommies women's basketball team
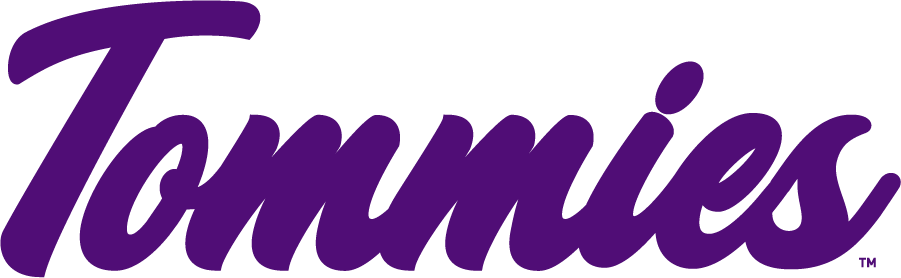
- University: University of St. Thomas
- First season: 1977
- Head coach: Mandy Pearson (1st season)
- Location: Saint Paul, Minnesota
- Arena: Lee & Penny Anderson Arena (capacity: 5,300)
- Conference: Summit League
- Nickname: Tommies
- Colors: Purple and gray

NCAA Division III tournament champions
- 1991
Other NCAA Division III tournament results
Final Four	1991, 1995, 1996, 2000, 2012, 2017, 2019
Appearances	1984, 1987, 1988, 1989, 1990, 1991, 1992, 1993, 1994, 1995, 1996, 1997, 1998, 1999, 2000, 2001, 2008, 2010, 2012, 2013, 2014, 2015, 2016, 2017, 2018, 2019

The St. Thomas Tommies women's basketball team represents the University of St. Thomas, located in Saint Paul, Minnesota, in NCAA Division I as a member of the Summit League.

The Tommies made their NCAA Division I debut under then-seventeenth-year head coach Ruth Sinn for the 2021–22 season. The team plays its games at Schoenecker Arena on its campus in St. Paul.

== History ==
The St. Thomas (MN) Tommies women's basketball team founded in 1977 after the college voted to admit women into the college. The Tommies' first head coach was Tom Kosel who mainly coached high school at Benilde-St. Margaret's. In 1984, the Tommies' hired Ted Riverso. They won the 1991 NCAA Division III National Champion beating Muskingum 73–55. During Riverso's tenure he won five MIAC Coach of the Year awards and went to the tournament 13 of his 15 years. After Riverso left to be an assistant at the University of Minnesota, Tricia Dornisch was hired in 1999 and won the MIAC Coach of the Year in 2000 in her first year. Ruth Sinn joined St. Thomas as the fourth head coach of St. Thomas in 2005 and has achieved the most wins in school history. Sinn has helped guide the Tommies' moving from the Minnesota Intercollegiate Athletic Conference in Division III to the Summit League in Division I.

== Season-by-season results ==
Record table
Season	Coach	Overall	Conference	Standing	Postseason
Tom Kosel (No Conference) (1977–1982)
1977–78	Tom Kosel	12–7	—	—	
1978–79	Tom Kosel	18–4	—	—	
1979–80	Tom Kosel	–	—	—	
1980–81	Tom Kosel	–	—	—	
1981–82	Tom Kosel	–	—	—	
Tom Kosel (Minnesota Intercollegiate Athletic Conference) (1982–1984)
1982–83	Tom Kosel	–	8—1	T–1st	
1983–84	Tom Kosel	–	18—2	1st	NCAA Division III Regional Third Place
Tom Kosel:		123–54 (.695)	26–3 (.897)		
Ted Riverso (Minnesota Intercollegiate Athletic Conference) (1984–1999)
1984–85	Ted Riverso	–	12—8	T—3rd	
1985–86	Ted Riverso	–	10—12	T—6th	
1986–87	Ted Riverso	–	18—4	2nd	NCAA Division III Regional Fourth Place
1987–88	Ted Riverso	–	20—2	2nd	NCAA Division III Regional Second Place
1988–89	Ted Riverso	20–6	15—5	3rd	NCAA Division III Regional Third Place
1989–90	Ted Riverso	23–5	18—2	2nd	NCAA Division III Regional Second Place
1990–91	Ted Riverso	29–2	19—1	1st	NCAA Division III Championship
1991–92	Ted Riverso	27–1	20—0	1st	NCAA Division III Regional Second Place
1992–93	Ted Riverso	19–7	15—5	3rd	NCAA Division III First Round
1993–94	Ted Riverso	22–5	16—4	T—2nd	NCAA Division III Second Round
1994–95	Ted Riverso	25–6	17—3	2nd	NCAA Division III Third Place
1995–96	Ted Riverso	28–3	20—0	1st	NCAA Division III Third Place
1996–97	Ted Riverso	26–2	20—0	1st	NCAA Division III Sweet Sixteen
1997–98	Ted Riverso	26–2	21—1	T–1st	NCAA Division III Elite Eight
1998–99	Ted Riverso	22–4	19—3	2nd	NCAA Division III Second Round
Ted Riverso:		337–80 (.808)	260–50 (.839)		
Tricia Dornisch (Minnesota Intercollegiate Athletic Conference) (1999–2005)
1999–00	Tricia Dornisch	27–2	22—0	1st	NCAA Division III Third Place
2000–01	Tricia Dornisch	25–4	19—2	1st	NCAA Division III Sweet Sixteen
2001–02	Tricia Dornisch	21–5	19—3	T–1st	
2002–03	Tricia Dornisch	15–12	14—8	4th	
2003–04	Tricia Dornisch	13–13	12—10	6th	
2004–05	Tricia Dornisch	11–14	9—11	6th	
Tricia Dornisch:		113–50 (.693)	95–34 (.736)		
Ruth Sinn (Minnesota Intercollegiate Athletic Conference) (2005–2021)
2005–06	Ruth Sinn	10–15	7—13	T—7th	
2006–07	Ruth Sinn	15–11	14—8	5th	
2007–08	Ruth Sinn	20–8	18—4	T—1st	NCAA Division III First Round
2008–09	Ruth Sinn	19–8	16—6	3rd	
2009–10	Ruth Sinn	21–8	15–7	5th	NCAA Division III First Round
2010–11	Ruth Sinn	20–7	18—4	1st	
2011–12	Ruth Sinn	31–2	22—0	1st	NCAA Division III Third Place
2012–13	Ruth Sinn	24–6	18—4	T—2nd	NCAA Division III Sweet Sixteen
2013–14	Ruth Sinn	25–5	19—3	2nd	NCAA Division III Second Round
2014–15	Ruth Sinn	30–1	18—0	1st	NCAA Division III Elite Eight
2015–16	Ruth Sinn	26–4	16—2	1st	NCAA Division III Sweet Sixteen
2016–17	Ruth Sinn	31–1	18—0	1st	NCAA Division III Final Four
2017–18	Ruth Sinn	27–3	18—0	1st	NCAA Division III Sweet Sixteen
2018–19	Ruth Sinn	30–2	18—0	1st	NCAA Division III Final Four
2019–20	Ruth Sinn	21–6	16—4	3rd	
2020–21	Ruth Sinn	6–1	5—1	T–1st	
Ruth Sinn (Summit League) (2021–2026)
2021–22	Ruth Sinn	7–21	4—14	9th	
2022–23	Ruth Sinn	13–17	7—11	8th	
2023–24	Ruth Sinn	15–16	7—9	5th	
2024–25	Ruth Sinn	17–13	9—7	4th	
2025–26	Ruth Sinn	16–16	8—8	5th	
Ruth Sinn:		422–172 (.710)	291–105 (.735)		
Mandy Pearson (Summit League) (2026–present)
2026–27	Mandy Pearson	0–0	0—0		
Mandy Pearson:		0–0 (–)	0–0 (–)		
Total:		995–356 (.736)			
National champion Postseason invitational champion Conference regular season champion Conference regular season and conference tournament champion Division regular season champion Division regular season and conference tournament champion Conference tournament champion

== Head coaches ==
#	Name	Term	Record
1	Tom Kosel	1977–1984	123-54
2	Ted Riverso	1984–1999	337-80
3	Tricia Dornisch	1999–2005	113-50
4	Ruth Sinn	2005–2026	422-172
5	Mandy Pearson	2026–present	0-0
