= 2020–21 Oral Roberts Golden Eagles women's basketball team =

Intercollegiate basketball season

2020–21 Oral Roberts Golden Eagles women's basketball
- Conference: Summit League
- Head coach: Misti Cussen (9th season)
- Assistant coaches: Kyron Stokes; Lee Mayberry
- Home arena: Mabee Center

2020–21 Summit League women's basketball standings
	Conf.				Overall
Team	W		L	PCT	W		L	PCT
No. 25 South Dakota State	14	–	0	1.000	21	–	4	.840
South Dakota†	12	–	2	.857	19	–	6	.760
North Dakota State	9	–	7	.563	15	–	9	.625
Kansas City	7	–	8	.467	10	–	12	.455
Western Illinois	6	–	8	.429	8	–	16	.333
Denver	5	–	9	.357	7	–	16	.304
Omaha	4	–	8	.333	7	–	13	.350
Oral Roberts	4	–	8	.333	6	–	15	.286
North Dakota	2	–	13	.133	2	–	19	.095
† 2021 Summit League tournament winner As of December 2, 2021; Rankings from AP poll

The 2020–21 Oral Roberts Golden Eagles women's basketball team represented Oral Roberts University in the 2020–21 NCAA Division I women's basketball season. The Golden Eagles, led by ninth year head coach Misti Cussen, competed in the Summit League. They played home games in Mabee Center in Tulsa, Oklahoma.

== Previous season ==
The Golden Eagles went 15–16 overall and 9–7 in conference play, finishing third.

Oral Roberts won the quarterfinals against no. 5 seed Western Illinois 74–66, and at the semifinal lost against no. 1 seed South Dakota 43–65.

== Offseason ==
=== Departures ===
Name	Pos.	Height	Year	Hometown	Reason for departure
Katie Kirkhart	G	5'9"	Senior	Muskogee, OK	Transferred to Drury University
Rachel Skalnik	G	5'8"	Senior	Owasso, OK	Graduated
Rylie Torrey	G	5'11"	(redshirt) Senior	Locust Grove, OK	Graduated
Montserrat Brotons	C	6'4"	Senior	Cocentaina, Spain	Graduated
Sarah Garvie	G	5'8"	Senior	Burlington, OK	Graduated
Jentry Holt	F	6'3"	(redshirt) Senior	Elgin, OK	Graduated
Raelene Eddens	F	5'11"	(redshirt) Freshman	Luther, OK	—

=== Additions ===
Name	Number	Pos.	Height	Year	Hometown	Previous School
Manaya Jones	5	C	6'4"	Senior	Memphis, TN	Grand Canyon University
Sinetra Jones	21	C	6'5"	Sophomore	Memphis, TN	Dyersburg State CC
Ariel Walker	14	G	5'5"	Junior	Ozark, AR	Allen CC

=== 2020 recruiting class ===
College recruiting information
Name	Hometown	School	Height	Weight	Commit date
Bo Teulings; F	's-Hertogenbosch, Netherlands	Maurick College, Vaught	6 ft 0 in (1.83 m)	N/A	May 18th, 2020
Bo Teulings; F	Recruit ratings: No ratings found				
			N/A	N/A	
Recruit ratings: No ratings found
Overall recruit ranking:
Note: In many cases, Scout, Rivals, 247Sports, On3, and ESPN may conflict in their listings of height and weight.; In these cases, the average was taken. ESPN grades are on a 100-point scale.; Sources:

== Preseason ==
=== Summit League Preseason poll ===
The Summit League Preseason poll and other preseason awards was released on October 26, 2020 with the Golden Eagles selected to finish in fourth place in the Summit League.

Coaches Poll
Predicted finish	Team	Votes (1st place)
1	South Dakota	587 (25)
2	South Dakota State	566 (11)
3	Western Illinois	389
4	Oral Roberts	376
5	North Dakota State	371
6	Kansas City	323
7	Denver	300
8	North Dakota	203
9	Omaha	124

=== Preseason All-Summit teams ===
The Golden Eagles had one player selected to the preseason all-Summit teams.

First team

Keni Jo Lippe

== Roster ==
2020–21 Oral Roberts Golden Eagles women's basketball team
Players
Coaches

Pos.	#	Name	Height	Year	Previous school	Hometown
G	0	Tyaija Coleman	5 ft 9 in (1.75 m)	Fr	Trinity Christian	Arlington, TX
G	1	Nena Taylor	5 ft 8 in (1.73 m)	So	Parsons HS	Parsons, KS
G	2	Tierney Coleman	5 ft 9 in (1.75 m)	Fr	Trinity Christian	Arlington, TX
G	3	Corrie Anderson	5 ft 8 in (1.73 m)	Fr	Colorado Springs Christian	Colorado Springs, CO
F	4	Hannah Giddey	6 ft 1 in (1.85 m)	Fr	Albert Park College	Melbourne, Australia
C	5	Manaya Jones	6 ft 4 in (1.93 m)	RS Sr	Raleigh-Egypt; Grand Canyon	Memphis, TN
F	10	Bo Teulings	6 ft 0 in (1.83 m)	So	Maurick College	's-Hertogenbosch, Netherlands
G	11	Gem Summers	5 ft 9 in (1.75 m)	So	Victory Christian	Tulsa, OK
G	12	Camryn Hill	5 ft 11 in (1.8 m)	Fr	South Grand Prairie HS	Dallas, TX
G	14	Ariel Walker	5 ft 5 in (1.65 m)	Jr	Ozark HS; Allen CC	Ozark, AR
C	20	Regan Schumacher	6 ft 2 in (1.88 m)	Sr	Olathe East HS	Olathe, KS
C	21	Sinetra Jones	6 ft 5 in (1.96 m)	So	Manassas HS; Dyersburg CC	Memphis, TN
F	22	Faith Paramore	5 ft 11 in (1.8 m)	Fr	Haven HS	Haven, KS
G	24	Courtlyn Loudermill	5 ft 7 in (1.7 m)	Fr	Hebron HS	Killeen, TX
F	32	Addisyn Moore	6 ft 0 in (1.83 m)	Fr	Trinity Christian	Dallas, TX
G	33	Keni Jo Lippe	5 ft 9 in (1.75 m)	Sr	Adair HS	Adair, OK

Head coach

- Misti Cussen (Southern Nazarene)

Assistant coach(es)

- Kyron Stokes (Oral Roberts)
- Lee Mayberry (Arkansas)

Legend

- (C) Team captain
- (S) Suspended
- (I) Ineligible
- (W) Walk-on
- Injured
- Current redshirt

Roster

== Schedule ==
Date time, TV	Rank^{#}	Opponent^{#}	Result	Record	High points	High rebounds	High assists	Site (attendance) city, state
Non-conference regular season
November 25, 2020*; 11:00 am, SECN+		at No. 14 Arkansas	L 49–96	0–1	14 – Paramore	7 – Paramore	1 – Tied	Bud Walton Arena (1,428); Fayetteville, AR
November 29, 2020*; 2:00 pm		at Oklahoma State	L 54–73	0–2	16 – Summers	12 – Schumacher	1 – Tied	Gallagher-Iba Arena (905); Stillwater, OK
December 4, 2020*; 6:00 pm, BTN+		at Nebraska	L 61–90	0–3	19 – Hill	11 – Schumacher	2 – Tied	Pinnacle Bank Arena (20); Lincoln, NE
December 6, 2020*; 2:00 pm, ESPN+		at Kansas	L 59–100	0–4	16 – Ti. Coleman	8 – Schumacher	4 – Ty. Coleman	Allen Fieldhouse (0); Lawrence, KS
December 10, 2020*; 7:00 pm		Tarleton State	W 66–56	1–4	16 – Schumacher	15 – Schumacher	4 – Walker	Mabee Center (916); Tulsa, OK
December 14, 2020*; 7:00 pm		Rogers State	W 71–60	2–4	18 – Ti. Coleman	17 – Schumacher	3 – Tied	Mabee Center (853); Tulsa, OK
December 16, 2020*; 7:00 pm		Air Force	Canceled due to COVID-19					Mabee Center; Tulsa, OK
December 19, 2020*; 2:00 pm, SECN+		at Missouri	L 49–88	2–5	17 – Ti. Coleman	6 – Tied	4 – Lippe	Mizzou Arena (1622); Columbia, MO
December 22, 2020*; 1:00 pm, ESPN+		at TCU	L 48–62	2–6	13 – Lippe	9 – Hill	3 – Tied	Schollmaier Arena (841); Fort Worth, TX
Summit League regular season
January 2, 2021		at Omaha	Postponed and later canceled due to COVID-19					Baxter Arena; Omaha, NE
January 3, 2021		at Omaha	Postponed and later canceled due to COVID-19					Baxter Arena; Omaha, NE
January 8, 2021; 5:00 pm		North Dakota	W 84–71	3–6 (1–0)	21 – Ti. Coleman	10 – Schumacher	5 – Ti. Coleman	Mabee Center (859); Tulsa, OK
January 9, 2021; 5:00 pm		North Dakota	W 90–82	4–6 (2–0)	31 – Summers	7 – Tied	3 – Lippe	Mabee Center (882); Tulsa, OK
January 15, 2021; 3:00 pm		at Denver	L 71–89	4–7 (2–1)	16 – Lippe	9 – Schumacher	3 – Walker	Hamilton Gymnasium; Denver, CO
January 16, 2021; 3:00 pm		at Denver	W 79–78	5–7 (3–1)	15 – Lippe	7 – Ti. Coleman	5 – Ti. Coleman	Hamilton Gymnasium; Denver, CO
January 23, 2021; 2:00 pm		Kansas City	L 93–101 ^{OT}	5–8 (3–2)	24 – Lippe	7 – Lippe	5 – Lippe	Mabee Center (1092); Tulsa, OK
January 24, 2021; 2:00 pm		Kansas City	W 71–67	6–8 (4–2)	30 – Lippe	10 – Schumacher	4 – Hill	Mabee Center (1039); Tulsa, OK
February 5, 2021; 5:00 pm		at North Dakota State	L 49–70	6–9 (4–3)	11 – Ti. Coleman	9 – Schumacher	1 – Tied	Scheels Center (459); Fargo, ND
February 6, 2021; 5:00 pm		at North Dakota State	L 63–78	6–10 (4–4)	17 – Paramore	6 – Walker	2 – Tied	Scheels Center (833); Fargo, ND
February 13, 2021; 1:00 pm		No. 23 South Dakota State	L 60–82	6–11 (4–5)	19 – Ti. Coleman	5 – Tied	3 – Schumacher	Mabee Center (1013); Tulsa, OK
February 14, 2021; 1:00 pm		No. 23 South Dakota State	L 61–73	6–12 (4–6)	22 – Ti. Coleman	9 – Schumacher	5 – Ti. Coleman	Mabee Center (831); Tulsa, OK
February 20, 2021; 1:00 pm		South Dakota	L 54–77	6–13 (4–7)	15 – Ti. Coleman	5 – Tied	2 – Tied	Sanford Coyote Sports Center (830); Vermillion, SD
February 21, 2021; 12:00 pm		South Dakota	L 54–76	6–14 (4–8)	14 – Walker	10 – Lippe	2 – Tied	Sanford Coyote Sports Center (650); Vermillion, SD
February 27, 2021		Western Illinois	Canceled due to COVID-19					Mabee Center; Tulsa, OK
February 28, 2021		Western Illinois	Canceled due to COVID-19					Mabee Center; Tulsa, OK
Summit League Women's Tournament
March 6, 2021; 2:45 pm, ESPN+/MidcoSN	(7)	vs. (2) South Dakota; Quarterfinals	L 66–89	6–15	21 – Ti. Coleman	7 – Schumacher	3 – Paramore	Sanford Pentagon (200); Sioux Falls, SD
*Non-conference game. ^{#}Rankings from AP Poll. (#) Tournament seedings in parentheses. All times are in Central Time.
