= 2020–21 South Dakota Coyotes women's basketball team =

Intercollegiate basketball season

2020–21 South Dakota Coyotes women's basketball

Summit League tournament champions
- Conference: Summit League
- Record: 19–6 (12–2 The Summit)
- Head coach: Dawn Plitzuweit (5th season)
- Assistant coaches: Jason Jeschke; Aaron Horn; Jenna Schlafke
- Home arena: Sanford Coyote Sports Center

2020–21 Summit League women's basketball standings
| | Conf. | | | | Overall |
| Team | W | | L | PCT | W | | L | PCT |
|---|---|---|---|---|---|---|---|---|
| No. 25 South Dakota State | 14 | – | 0 | 1.000 | 21 | – | 4 | .840 |
| South Dakota† | 12 | – | 2 | .857 | 19 | – | 6 | .760 |
| North Dakota State | 9 | – | 7 | .563 | 15 | – | 9 | .625 |
| Kansas City | 7 | – | 8 | .467 | 10 | – | 12 | .455 |
| Western Illinois | 6 | – | 8 | .429 | 8 | – | 16 | .333 |
| Denver | 5 | – | 9 | .357 | 7 | – | 16 | .304 |
| Omaha | 4 | – | 8 | .333 | 7 | – | 13 | .350 |
| Oral Roberts | 4 | – | 8 | .333 | 6 | – | 15 | .286 |
| North Dakota | 2 | – | 13 | .133 | 2 | – | 19 | .095 |
† 2021 Summit League tournament winner As of December 2, 2021; Rankings from AP poll

The 2020–21 South Dakota Coyotes women's basketball team represented University of South Dakota in the 2020–21 NCAA Division I women's basketball season. The Coyotes, were led by fifth year head coach Dawn Plitzuweit, they competed in the Summit League. They played their home games in Sanford Coyote Sports Center in Vermillion, South Dakota.

== Previous season ==
The Coyotes went 30–2 and 16–0 in conference play. They finished first in the conference earning the first seed in the Summit League tournament. The coyotes won their quarterfinals game against Omaha 99–40. In their semifinals games they matched up against Oral Roberts and won 65–43. They reached the Championship game against in state rival South Dakota State and beat them to secure an automatic bid to the NCAA tournament. Days after the conference ended the NCAA tournament was canceled due to the COVID-19 pandemic.

== Offseason ==
=== Departures ===
| Name | Number | Pos. | Height | Year | Hometown | Notes |
|---|---|---|---|---|---|---|
| Taylor Frederick | 15 | F | 6'1" | Senior | Earling, IA | Graduated |
| Megan Bonar | 20 | F | 6'2" | Senior | Gardner, KS | Graduated |
| Madison McKeever | 23 | G | 5'6" | Senor | Erskine, MN | Graduated |
| Ciara Duffy | 24 | G | 6'0" | Senior | Rapid City, SD | Graduated |

=== Additions ===
| Name | Number | Pos. | Height | Year | Hometown | Notes |
|---|---|---|---|---|---|---|
| Morgan Hansen | 10 | F | 6'2" | Freshman | Sioux Falls, SD | Signed for the 2020–21 season |
| Natalie Mazurek | 23 | C | 6'2" | Freshman | Eden Prairie, MN | Signed for the 2020–21 season |
| Kyah Watson | 32 | G | 5'9" | Freshman | Rapid City, SD | Signed for the 2020–21 season |
| Maddie Krull | 42 | G | 5'8" | Freshman | Omaha, NE | Signed for the 2020–21 season |
| Aspen Williston | 31 | C | 6'4" | Junior | Broken Bow, OK | Transferred from Oklahoma |

== Roster ==
2020–21 South Dakota Coyotes women's basketball team
Players
Coaches

| Pos. | # | Name | Height | Year | Previous school | Hometown |
|---|---|---|---|---|---|---|
| G | 1 | Claudia Kunzer | 5 ft 7 in (1.7 m) | Sr | Montini Catholic High School | Bartlett, IL |
| G | 2 | Liv Korngable | 5 ft 8 in (1.73 m) | Sr | Mayo High School | Rochester, MN |
| G | 3 | Macy Guebert | 5 ft 9 in (1.75 m) | So | Eastview High School | Apple Valley, MN |
| F | 10 | Morgan Hansen | 6 ft 2 in (1.88 m) | Fr | Lincoln High School | Sioux Falls, SD |
| G | 11 | Monica Arens | 5 ft 10 in (1.78 m) | Sr | Crofton High School | Crofton, NE |
| F | 14 | Regan Sankey | 6 ft 0 in (1.83 m) | Jr | Lincoln East High School | Lincoln, NE |
| G | 22 | Chloe Lamb | 5 ft 10 in (1.78 m) | Sr | Sully Buttes High School | Onida, SD |
| C | 23 | Natalie Mazurek | 6 ft 2 in (1.88 m) | Fr | Eden Prairie High School | Eden Prairie, MN |
| F | 30 | Jeniah Ugofsky | 5 ft 11 in (1.8 m) | So | Harrisburg High School | Harrisburg, SD |
| C | 31 | Aspen Williston | 6 ft 4 in (1.93 m) | Jr | Broken Bow High School; Oklahoma | Broken Bow, OK |
| G | 32 | Kyah Watson | 5 ft 9 in (1.75 m) | Fr | Stevens High School | Rapid City, SD |
| C | 34 | Hannah Sjerven | 6 ft 3 in (1.91 m) | RS Sr | Rogers High School; New Mexico | Rogers, MN |
| F | 35 | Allison Peplowski | 6 ft 1 in (1.85 m) | RS So | Williamston High School | Williamston, MI |
| F | 41 | Alexi Hempe | 5 ft 11 in (1.8 m) | So | TPLS Christian Academy | Fredericksburg, VA |
| G | 42 | Maddie Krull | 5 ft 8 in (1.73 m) | Fr | Millard South High School | Omaha, NE |

Head coach

- Dawn Plitzuweit (Michigan Tech)

Assistant coach(es)

- Jason Jeschke (Southwestern (KS))
- Aaron Horn (Toledo)
- Jenna Schlafke (Concordia-Moorhead)

Legend

- (C) Team captain
- (S) Suspended
- (I) Ineligible
- (W) Walk-on
- Injured
- Current redshirt

Roster

== Schedule ==
| Date time, TV | Rank^{#} | Opponent^{#} | Result | Record | Site (attendance) city, state |
Non-conference regular season
| November 28, 2020*; 2:00 pm, FloHoops | | vs. No. 1 South Carolina; Crossover Classic | L 71–81 | 0–1 | Sanford Pentagon; Sioux Falls, SD |
| November 30, 2020*; 2:00 pm, FloHoops | | vs. No. 21 Gonzaga; Crossover Classic | L 50–54 | 0–2 | Sanford Pentagon; Sioux Falls, SD |
| November 30, 2020*; 5:00 pm, FloHoops | | vs. Oklahoma | Canceled due to Covid-19 issues | | Sanford Pentagon; Sioux Falls, SD |
| December 6, 2020*; 1:00 pm, MidcoSN/ESPN3 | | Lipscomb | W 89–52 | 1–2 | Sanford Coyote Sports Center (483); Vermilion, SD |
| December 10, 2020*; 6:00 pm | | at Wichita State | W 62–54 | 2–2 | Charles Koch Arena (625); Wichita, KS |
| December 17, 2020*; 1:00 pm, ESPN3 | | at Bradley | W 84–68 | 3–2 | Renaissance Coliseum; Peoria, IL |
| December 20, 2020*; 2:00 pm, FS Oklahoma | | at Oklahoma | L 73–80 | 3–3 | Lloyd Noble Center (608); Norman, OK |
| December 30, 2020*; 6:00 pm | | Midland | W 89–39 | 4–3 | Sanford Coyote Sports Center (360); Vermilion, SD |
Summit League Regular Season
| January 2, 2021; 1:00 pm, MidcoSN/ESPN+ | | Denver | W 87–47 | 5–3 (1–0) | Sanford Coyote Sports Center (475); Vermilion, SD |
| January 3, 2021; 1:00 pm, MidcoSN/ESPN+ | | Denver | W 89–74 | 6–3 (2–0) | Sanford Coyote Sports Center (420); Vermilion, SD |
| January 8, 2021; 2:00 pm | | at Kansas City | W 92–34 | 7–3 (3–0) | Swinney Recreation Center; Kansas City, MO |
| January 9, 2021; 2:00 pm | | at Kansas City | W 80–53 | 8–3 (4–0) | Swinney Recreation Center; Kansas City, MO |
| January 22, 2021; 4:30 pm | | at Western Illinois | W 73–56 | 9–3 (5–0) | Western Hall; Macomb, IL |
| January 23, 2021; 4:30 pm | | at Western Illinois | W 61–56 | 10–3 (6–0) | Western Hall; Macomb, IL |
| January 29, 2021; 5:00 pm, MidcoSN | | Omaha | Canceled due to Covid-19 issues | | Sanford Coyote Sports Center; Vermilion, SD |
| January 30, 2021; 4:00 pm, MidcoSN | | Omaha | Canceled due to Covid-19 issues | | Sanford Coyote Sports Center; Vermilion, SD |
| February 5, 2021; 5:00 pm, MidcoSN/ESPN3 | | at No. 23 South Dakota State | L 45–64 | 10–4 (6–1) | Frost Arena (808); Brookings, SD |
| February 6, 2021; 5:00 pm, MidcoSN/ESPN3 | | at No. 23 South Dakota State | L 75–80 | 10–5 (6–2) | Frost Arena (835); Brookings, SD |
| February 13, 2021; 12:00 pm, MidcoSN/ESPN3 | | at North Dakota | W 72–63 | 11–5 (7–2) | Betty Engelstad Sioux Center (650); Grand Forks, ND |
| February 14, 2021; 12:00 pm, MidcoSN/ESPN3 | | at North Dakota | W 64–47 | 12–5 (8–2) | Betty Engelstad Sioux Center (650); Grand Forks, ND |
| February 20, 2021; 1:00 pm | | Oral Roberts | W 77–54 | 13–5 (9–2) | Sanford Coyote Sports Center (830); Vermilion, SD |
| Februar 21, 2021; 12:00 pm, MidcoSN/ESPN3 | | Oral Roberts; Pink Game | W 76–54 | 14–5 (10–2) | Sanford Coyote Sports Center (650); Vermilion, SD |
| February 27, 2021; 1:00 pm | | North Dakota State | W 82–81 | 15–5 (11–2) | Sanford Coyote Sports Center (890); Vermilion, SD |
| February 28, 2021; 1:00 pm, MidcoSN/ESPN3 | | North Dakota State | W 81–61 | 16–5 (12–2) | Sanford Coyote Sports Center (852); Vermilion, SD |
Summit League Women's Tournament
| March 6, 2021; 2:45 pm, MidcosSN/ESPN+ | (2) | vs. (7) Oral Roberts; Quarterfinals | W 89–66 | 17–5 | Denny Sanford Premier Center (200); Sioux Falls, SD |
| March 8, 2021; 2:45 pm, MidcosSN/ESPN+ | (2) | vs. (3) North Dakota State; Semifinals | W 81–55 | 18–5 | Denny Sanford Premier Center (200); Sioux Falls, SD |
| March 9, 2021; 1:00 pm, ESPNU | (2) | vs. (8) Omaha; Championship | W 66–43 | 19–5 | Denny Sanford Premier Center (200); Sioux Falls, SD |
NCAA Women's Tournament
| March 22, 2021*; 9:00 pm, ESPN2 | (11 A) | vs. (6 A) No. 23 Oregon; First Round | L 47–67 | 19–6 | Alamodome; San Antonio, TX |
*Non-conference game. ^{#}Rankings from AP Poll. (#) Tournament seedings in parentheses. A=Alamo Region. All times are in Central Time.
