= 2020–21 South Dakota State Jackrabbits women's basketball team =

Intercollegiate basketball season

2020–21 South Dakota State Jackrabbits women's basketball

The Summit League regular-season championship

NCAA tournament, first round
- Conference: Summit League

Ranking
- AP: No. 25
- Record: 21–4 (14–0 The Summit)
- Head coach: Aaron Johnston (21st full, 22nd overall season)
- Assistant coaches: Mike Jewett; Carissa Thielbar; Megan Lueck
- Home arena: Frost Arena

2020–21 Summit League women's basketball standings
	Conf.				Overall
Team	W		L	PCT	W		L	PCT
No. 25 South Dakota State	14	–	0	1.000	21	–	4	.840
South Dakota†	12	–	2	.857	19	–	6	.760
North Dakota State	9	–	7	.563	15	–	9	.625
Kansas City	7	–	8	.467	10	–	12	.455
Western Illinois	6	–	8	.429	8	–	16	.333
Denver	5	–	9	.357	7	–	16	.304
Omaha	4	–	8	.333	7	–	13	.350
Oral Roberts	4	–	8	.333	6	–	15	.286
North Dakota	2	–	13	.133	2	–	19	.095
† 2021 Summit League tournament winner As of December 2, 2021; Rankings from AP poll

The 2020–21 South Dakota State Jackrabbits women's basketball team represented South Dakota State University in the 2020–21 NCAA Division I women's basketball season. The Jackrabbits, led by 21st-year head coach Aaron Johnston, competed in the Summit League. They played their home games at Frost Arena in Brookings, South Dakota.

== Previous season ==
In 2019–20 the Jackrabbits went 23–10 overall and 13–3 in conference play, finishing in second place.

South Dakota State played North Dakota in the quarterfinals, winning 72–43, and followed it up two days later with a win in the semifinals against North Dakota State 76–56. The Jackrabbits made an appearance in the championship game against 17th-ranked South Dakota, falling short 58–63.

The postseason was put on hold due to the coronavirus outbreak, and hopes for a possible NCAA at-large bid or automatic WNIT birth were dashed.

=== Departures ===
Name	Number	Pos.	Height	Year	Hometown	Reason for departure
Rylie Cascio Jensen	2	G	5' 10"	Senior	Fremont, NE	Graduated
Tagyn Larson	24	F	6' 2"	RS senior	Sioux Falls, SD	Graduated
Megan Bultsma	50	C	6' 3"	Senior	Plankinton, SD	Graduated

=== Additions ===
Name	Number	Pos.	Height	Year	Hometown	Notes
Haley Greer	11	G	5' 10"	Senior	Winnetka, IL	Graduate transfer from Colgate
Madysen Vlastuin	22	F	6' 1"	Freshman	Lennox, SD	Signed for the 2020–21 season
Emily Herzberg	4	G	6' 0"	Freshman	Melrose, WI	Signed for the 2020–21 season
Mesa Byom	24	F	6' 2"	Freshman	Melrose, WI	Signed for the 2020–21 season

== Roster ==
2020–21 South Dakota State Jackrabbits women's basketball team
Players
Coaches

Pos.	#	Name	Height	Year	Previous school	Hometown
G	3	Lindsey Theuninck	5 ft 7 in (1.7 m)	RS Jr	Mankato Loyola	Mankato, MN
G	4	Emily Herzberg	6 ft 0 in (1.83 m)	Fr	Melrose-Mindoro HS	Melrose, WI
G	10	Lauren Rongisch	5 ft 7 in (1.7 m)	RS So	Millard West HS	Omaha, NE
G	11	Haley Greer	5 ft 10 in (1.78 m)	GS	New Trier HS; Colgate	Winnetka, IL
F	12	Kallie Theisen	6 ft 1 in (1.85 m)	So	Wayzata High School	Plymouth, MN
F	20	Tori Nelson	6 ft 1 in (1.85 m)	So	Henry Sibley High School	Mendota Heights, MN
G	21	Tylee Irwin	6 ft 0 in (1.83 m)	Sr	Wahpeton	Wahpeton, ND
F	22	Madysen Vlastuin	6 ft 1 in (1.85 m)	Fr	Lennox HS	Lennox, SD
F	24	Mesa Byom	6 ft 2 in (1.88 m)	Fr	Melrose-Mindoro HS	Melrose, WI
F	30	Jordan Ferrand	6 ft 2 in (1.88 m)	Jr	White Bear Lake HS	Lino Lakes, MN
F	33	Paiton Burckhard	6 ft 0 in (1.83 m)	Jr	Central HS	Aberdeen, SD
F	35	Sydney Stapleton	5 ft 10 in (1.78 m)	Jr	Centennial HS	Blaine, MN
F	42	Regan Nesheim	6 ft 1 in (1.85 m)	RS Fr	Johnston High School	Johnston, IA
G/F	44	Myah Selland	6 ft 1 in (1.85 m)	RS Jr	Sanborn Central/Woonsocket HS	Letcher, SD
C	52	Addison Hirschman	6 ft 2 in (1.88 m)	Jr	Kingsley-Pierson HS	Kingsley, IA

Head coach

- Aaron Johnston (Gustavus Adolphus)

Assistant coach(es)

- Mike Jewett (Augustana (SD))
- Carissa Thielbar (UW–Superior)
- Megan Lueck (Minnesota Duluth)

Legend

- (C) Team captain
- (S) Suspended
- (I) Ineligible
- (W) Walk-on
- Injured
- Current redshirt

Roster
Last update: July 17, 2024

== Schedule ==
Date time, TV	Rank^{#}	Opponent^{#}	Result	Record	Site (attendance) city, state
Non-conference regular season
November 28, 2020*; 2:00 p.m., MidcoSN/ESPN3		No. 15 Iowa State	W 76–69	1–0	Frost Arena (678); Brookings, SD
November 30, 2020*; 6:00 p.m., MidcoSN/ESPN3		Creighton	W 66–47	2–0	Frost Arena; Brookings, SD
December 6, 2020*; 2:00 p.m.		No. 18 Gonzaga	W 75–72 ^{OT}	3–0	Frost Arena (583); Brookings, SD
December 10, 2020*; 6:30 p.m., ESPN+	No. 22	at Kansas State	L 53–62	3–1	Bramlage Coliseum (437); Manhattan, KS
December 12, 2020*; 3:00 p.m., ESPN3	No. 22	at Northern Iowa	L 48–65	3–2	McLeod Center; Cedar Falls, IA
December 15, 2020*; 6:00 p.m., ESPN3		Drake	W 87–73	4–2	Frost Arena; Brookings, SD
December 19, 2020*; 1:00 p.m., ESPN3		at No. 20 Missouri State	W 60–52	5–2	JQH Arena; Springfield, MO
December 21, 2020*; 1:00 p.m.		at Montana State	W 82–67	6–2	Worthington Arena; Bozeman, MT
December 23, 2020*; 2:00 p.m., ESPN3		Northern Iowa	W 74–63	7–2	Frost Arena; Brookings, SD
Summit League regular season
January 8, 2021; 5:00 p.m.		Western Illinois	W 71–61	8–2 (1–0)	Frost Arena (504); Brookings, SD
January 9, 2021; 5:00 p.m.		Western Illinois	W 87–66	9–2 (2–0)	Frost Arena (553); Brookings, SD
January 15, 2021; 3:00 p.m.		at Omaha	W 62–50	10–2 (3–0)	Baxter Arena (169); Omaha, NE
January 16, 2021; 3:00 p.m.		at Omaha	W 64–54	11–2 (4–0)	Baxter Arena (207); Omaha, NE
January 22, 2021; 5:00 p.m., ESPN+		North Dakota	W 81–52	12–2 (5–0)	Frost Arena (594); Brookings, SD
January 23, 2021; 5:00 p.m.		North Dakota	W 66–44	13–2 (6–0)	Frost Arena (558); Brookings, SD
January 29, 2021; 5:00 p.m.	No. 25	at Denver			Hamilton Gymnasium; Denver, CO
January 30, 2021; 5:00 p.m.	No. 25	at Denver			Hamilton Gymnasium; Denver, CO
February 5, 2021; 5:00 p.m., ESPN3	No. 23	South Dakota	W 64–45	14–2 (7–0)	Frost Arena (808); Brookings, SD
February 6, 2021; 5:00 p.m., ESPN3	No. 23	South Dakota	W 80–75	15–2 (8–0)	Frost Arena (835); Brookings, SD
February 13, 2021; 2:00 p.m.	No. 23	at Oral Roberts	W 82–60	16–2 (9–0)	Mabee Center (1013); Tulsa, OK
February 14, 2021; 2:00 p.m.	No. 23	at Oral Roberts	W 73–61	17–2 (10–0)	Mabee Center (0); Tulsa, OK
February 19, 2021; 5:00 p.m., ESPN3	No. 23	at North Dakota State	W 86–78	18–2 (11–0)	Scheels Center (1005); Fargo, ND
February 20, 2021; 5:00 p.m., ESPN3	No. 23	at North Dakota State	W 69–60	19–2 (12–0)	Scheels Center (1955); Fargo, ND
February 26, 2021; 5:00 p.m., ESPN3	No. 22	Kansas City	W 73–53	20–2 (13–0)	Frost Arena (640); Brookings, SD
February 27, 2021; 5:00 p.m., ESPN+	No. 22	Kansas City	W 72–66	21–2 (14–0)	Frost Arena (629); Brookings, SD
Summit League women's tournament
March 6, 2021; 11:45 a.m., ESPN+/MidcoSN	(1) No. 22	vs. (8) Omaha; Quarterfinals	L 40–52	21–3	Denny Sanford Premier Center (200); Sioux Falls, SD
NCAA women's tournament
March 21, 2021*; 4:30 p.m., ESPN2	(9 R) No. 25	vs. (8 R) Syracause; First round	L 55–72	21–4	Frank Erwin Center; Austin, TX
*Non-conference game. ^{#}Rankings from AP poll. (#) Tournament seedings in parentheses. All times are in Central.

== Rankings ==
Regular-season polls
Poll	Pre- season	Week 2	Week 3	Week 4	Week 5	Week 6	Week 7	Week 8	Week 9	Week 10	Week 11	Week 12	Week 13	Week 14	Week 15	Week 16	Final
AP	RV	RV	22	RV	RV	RV	RV	RV	RV	25	23	23	23	22	21	25	25
Coaches	RV	*	21	RV	25	RV	RV	RV	RV	RV	RV	RV	25	24	22	25	RV

Legend
	Increase in ranking
	Decrease in ranking
	Not ranked previous week
(RV)	Received votes
(NR)	Not ranked
