= Vought (disambiguation) =

Vought was an American aircraft company founded by Chance M. Vought.

Vought may also refer to:

- Vought (surname)
- Vought American (Vought International in the television series), an antagonist corporation in the fictional universe of The Boys
