= Minnesota Golden Gophers women's basketball =

Minnesota Golden Gophers
2026–27 Minnesota Golden Gophers women's basketball team
- University: University of Minnesota
- Head coach: Dawn Plitzuweit (4th season)
- Location: Minneapolis, Minnesota
- Arena: The Barn (capacity: 14,625)
- Conference: Big Ten
- Nickname: Golden Gophers
- Colors: Maroon and gold

NCAA Division I tournament Final Four
- 2004
Other NCAA Division I tournament results
Elite Eight	2004
Sweet Sixteen	2003, 2004, 2005, 2026
Appearances	1994, 2002, 2003, 2004, 2005, 2006, 2008, 2009, 2015, 2018, 2026

AIAW tournament second round
- 1977

AIAW tournament appearances
- 1977, 1981, 1982

Uniforms
Home	Away

The Minnesota Golden Gophers women's basketball team represents the University of Minnesota in Minneapolis, Minnesota. The Golden Gophers have played in the Big Ten since the conference began sponsoring basketball in 1982. The team plays its home games in The Barn and is currently coached by Dawn Plitzuweit.

The Golden Gophers have made nine appearances in the NCAA Women's Division I Basketball Championship, highlighted by a Final Four appearance in 2004. The Golden Gophers also have three appearances in the AIAW women's basketball tournament.

== History ==
The Golden Gophers have had 5 players play professional basketball, as well as eight players named All-Americans. Four players, Lindsay Whalen, Amanda Zahui B., and Janel McCarville, Rachel Banham were selected in the top four of WNBA draft. The Gophers have ranked in the top 20 nationally in attendance for seven seasons, starting with the 2001–2002 season.

== Postseason appearances ==
=== AIAW Women's Basketball Tournament appearances ===
The Golden Gophers appeared in the AIAW women's basketball tournament (the precursor to the modern NCAA Women's Division I Basketball Championship) three times before it was discontinued in 1982. They compiled a record of 1–3.

Year	Round	Opponent	Result
1977	First Round	Delta State	L 42–87
1981	First Round	Jackson State	L 65–68
1982	First Round; Quarterfinals	St. Johns; Rutgers	W 68–56; L 75–83

=== NCAA Division I Tournament results ===
The Golden Gophers have appeared in eleven NCAA Division I Tournaments. They achieved their highest ranking in 2005 with a #3 seed. Their overall record is 14–11.

Year	Seed	Round	Opponent	Result
1994	#10	First Round; Second Round	#7 Notre Dame #2 Vanderbilt	W 81–76; L 72–98
2002	#5	First Round; Second Round	#12 UNLV #4 North Carolina	W 71–54; L 69–72
2003	#6	First Round; Second Round; Sweet Sixteen	#11 Tulane #3 Stanford #2 Texas	W 68–48; W 68–56; L 60–73
2004	#7	First Round; Second Round; Sweet Sixteen; Elite Eight; Final Four	#10 UCLA #2 Kansas State #3 Boston College #1 Duke #2 Connecticut	W 92–81; W 80–61; W 76–63; W 82–75; L 58–67
2005	#3	First Round; Second Round; Sweet Sixteen	#14 St. Francis (PA) #6 Virginia #2 Baylor	W 64–33; W 73–58; L 57–64
2006	#8	First Round	#9 Washington	L 69–73
2008	#9	First Round	#8 Texas	L 55–72
2009	#10	First Round; Second Round	#7 Notre Dame #2 Texas A&M	W 79–71; L 42–73
2015	#8	First Round	#9 DePaul	L 72–79
2018	#10	First Round; Second Round	#7 Green Bay #2 Oregon	W 89–77; L 73–101
2026	#4	First Round; Second Round; Sweet Sixteen	#13 Green Bay #5 Ole Miss #1 UCLA	W 75–58; W 65–63; L 56–80

=== WBIT Results ===
The Golden Gophers have appeared in the Women's Basketball Invitation Tournament (WBIT) one time. Their record is 5–0.

Year	Round	Opponent	Result
2025	First Round; Second Round; Quarterfinals; Semifinals; Championship	Toledo; Missouri State; Gonzaga; Florida; Belmont	W 65–53; W 78-71; W 82-77 OT; W 66-52; W 75-63

== Head coaches ==
- Joan Stevenson, 1971–1972 (5–3)
- Deb Wilson, 1972–1973 (8–8)
- Linda Wells, 1973–1974 (3–10)
- Jenny Johnson, 1974–1977 (36–37)
- Ellen Mosher-Hanson, 1977–1987 (172–125)
- LaRue Fields, 1987–1990 (24–60)
- Linda Hill-MacDonald, 1990–1997 (66–126)
- Cheryl Littlejohn, 1997–2001 (29–81)
- Brenda Oldfield, 2001–2002 (22–8)
- Pam Borton, 2002–2014 (236–152)
- Marlene Stollings, 2014–2018 (82–47)
- Lindsay Whalen, 2018–2023 (71–76)
- Dawn Plitzuweit, 2023–present

== Gophers in the WNBA ==
Player	Draft	Seasons	Years
Lindsay Whalen	2004 – 4th by Connecticut	15	(2004-2018) Last with Minnesota; 4x WNBA Champion
Janel McCarville	2005 – 1st by Charlotte	9	(2005-2010; 2013-2014; 2016) Last with Minnesota; WNBA Champion
Emily Fox	2009 – 30th by Minnesota	0	-
Amanda Zahui B.	2015 – 2nd by Tulsa	7	(2015-2021; 2023) Last with Indiana
Shae Kelley	2015 – 35th by Minnesota	1	(2015) Last with Minnesota; WNBA Champion
Rachel Banham	2016 – 4th by Connecticut	7	(2016-present) Currently with Connecticut
Carlie Wagner	2018 – 36th by Minnesota	0	-
Kenisha Bell	2019 – 30th by Minnesota	1	(2019) Last with Minnesota

== Year-by-year results ==
Conference tournament winners noted with # Source

Season	Team	Overall	Conference	Standing	Postseason	Coaches' poll	AP poll
Joan Stevenson (Independent) (1971–1972)
1971–72	Joan Stevenson	5–3	–				
Joan Stevenson:		5–3	–				
Deb Wilson (Independent) (1972–1973)
1972–73	Deb Wilson	8–8	–				
Deb Wilson:		8–8	–				
Linda Wells (Independent) (1973–1974)
1973–74	Linda Wells	3–10	–		MWIAA		
Linda Wells:		3–10	–				
Jenny Johnson (Independent) (1974–1977)
1974–75	Jenny Johnson	7–12	–		MWIAA		
1975–76	Jenny Johnson	14–11	–		MWIAA		
1976–77	Jenny Johnson	15–14	–		AIAW First Round		
Jenny Johnson:		36–37	–				
Ellen Mosher Hanson (Independent, Big Ten) (1977–1987)
1977–78	Ellen Mosher Hanson	24–10	–		NWIT Seventh Place		
1978–79	Ellen Mosher Hanson	17–15	–		NWIT Fifth Place		
1979–80	Ellen Mosher Hanson	18–11	–		AIAW Regional		
1980–81	Ellen Mosher Hanson	28–7	–		AIAW First Round		18
Big Ten Conference
1981–82	Ellen Mosher Hanson	18–11	0–1		AIAW First Round		
1982–83	Ellen Mosher Hanson	20–7	13–5	T-3rd			
1983–84	Ellen Mosher Hanson	12–15	9–9	7th			
1984–85	Ellen Mosher Hanson	18–10	13–5	3rd			
1985–86	Ellen Mosher Hanson	8–20	4–14	9th			
1986–87	Ellen Mosher Hanson	9–19	4–14	T-8th			
Ellen Mosher Hanson:		172–125	43–48				
LaRue Fields (Big Ten) (1988–1991)
1987–88	LaRue Fields	9–18	5–13	8th			
1988–89	LaRue Fields	7–21	4–14	10th			
1989–90	LaRue Fields	8–21	3–15	T-9th			
LaRue Fields:		24–60	12–42				
Linda Hill-MacDonald (Big Ten) (1990–1997)
1990–91	Linda Hill-MacDonald	6–22	2–16	10th			
1991–92	Linda Hill-MacDonald	8–19	3–15	T-9th			
1992–93	Linda Hill-MacDonald	14–12	9–9	5th			
1993–94	Linda Hill-MacDonald	18–11	10–8	T-4th	NCAA Second Round		
1994–95	Linda Hill-MacDonald	12–15	7–9	T-7th			
1995–96	Linda Hill-MacDonald	4–23	0–16	11th			
1996–97	Linda Hill-MacDonald	4–24	1–15	11th			
Linda Hill-MacDonald:		66–126	32–88				
Cheryl Littlejohn (Big Ten) (1997–2001)
1997–98	Cheryl Littlejohn	4–23	1–15	11th			
1998–99	Cheryl Littlejohn	7–20	2–14	T-10th			
1999–2000	Cheryl Littlejohn	10–18	3–13	T-10th			
2000–01	Cheryl Littlejohn	8–20	1–15	10th			
Cheryl Littlejohn:		29–81	7–57				
Brenda Oldfield (Big Ten) (2001–2002)
2001–02	Brenda Oldfield	22–8	11–5	T-2nd	NCAA Second Round	21	18
Brenda Oldfield:		22–8	11–5				
Pam Borton (Big Ten) (2002–2014)
2002–03	Pam Borton	25–6	12–4	T-2nd	NCAA Sweet Sixteen	13	17
2003–04	Pam Borton	25–9	9–7	6th	NCAA Final Four	4	24
2004–05	Pam Borton	26–8	12–4	4th	NCAA Sweet Sixteen	11	12
2005–06	Pam Borton	19–10	11–5	T-3rd	NCAA First Round		25
2006–07	Pam Borton	17–16	7–9	T-5th	WNIT First Round (Bye)		
2007–08	Pam Borton	20–12	11–7	T-3rd	NCAA First Round		
2008–09	Pam Borton	20–12	11–7	T-5th	NCAA Second Round		
2009–10	Pam Borton	13–17	6–12	11th			
2010–11	Pam Borton	12–18	4–12	9th			
2011–12	Pam Borton	19–17	6–10	8th	WBI Champion		
2012–13	Pam Borton	18–14	7–9	T-8th	WNIT First Round		
2013-14	Pam Borton	22–13	8–8	T-6th	WNIT Third Round		
Pam Borton:		236–152	104–94				
Marlene Stollings (Big Ten) (2014–2018)
2014-15	Marlene Stollings	23–10	11–7	6th	NCAA First Round		
2015-16	Marlene Stollings	20–12	11–7	5th	WNIT Second Round		
2016-17	Marlene Stollings	15–16	5–11	10th			
2017-18	Marlene Stollings	24–9	11–5	T–3rd	NCAA Second Round		
Marlene Stollings:		82–47 (.636)	38–30 (.559)				
Lindsay Whalen (Big Ten) (2018–2023)
2018-19	Lindsay Whalen	21–11	9–9	T-6th	WNIT Second Round		
2019-20	Lindsay Whalen	16–15	5–12	11th			
2020-21	Lindsay Whalen	8–13	7–11	10th			
2021-22	Lindsay Whalen	15–18	7–11	T-9th	WNIT Second Round		
2022-23	Lindsay Whalen	11–19	4–14	12th			
Lindsay Whalen:		71–76 (.483)	31–56 (.356)				
Dawn Plitzuweit (Big Ten) (2023–present)
2023-24	Dawn Plitzuweit	20–16	5–13	T-11th	WNIT Runner-Up		
2024-25	Dawn Plitzuweit	25–11	8–10	13th	WBIT Champion		
2025-26	Dawn Plitzuweit	24-9	13-5	T-4th	NCAA Sweet Sixteen	15	18
Dawn Plitzuweit:		69–36 (.657)	26–28 (.481)				
Total:		838–785 (.516)					
National champion Postseason invitational champion Conference regular season champion Conference regular season and conference tournament champion Division regular season champion Division regular season and conference tournament champion Conference tournament champion
