= Amaka Agugua-Hamilton =

American basketball player and coach

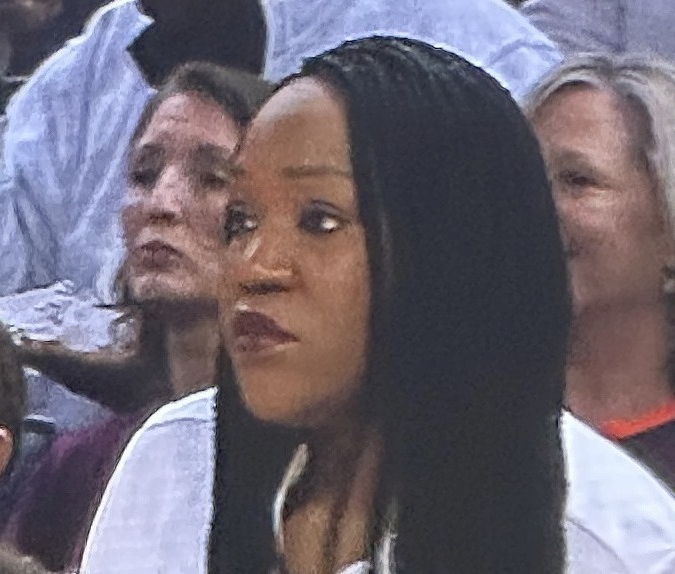
- Agugua-Hamilton in 2024

Biographical details
- Born: April 13, 1983 (age 43); Herndon, Virginia, U.S.
- Education: Hofstra (BBM); VCU (MA)

Playing career
- 2001–2006: Hofstra

Coaching career (HC unless noted)
- 2006–2007: VCU (graduate assistant)
- 2007–2009: VCU (assistant)
- 2009–2011: Indiana (assistant)
- 2011–2013: Old Dominion (assistant)
- 2013–2015: Michigan State (assistant)
- 2015–2019: Michigan State (associate HC)
- 2019–2022: Missouri State
- 2022–2026: Virginia

Head coaching record
- Overall: 144–73 (.664)

Accomplishments and honors

Championships
- MVC regular season (2020, 2021)

Awards
- MVC Coach of the year (2020, 2021); Spalding Maggie Dixon Rookie Coach of the Year (2020)

Amaka Agugua-Hamilton (born April 13, 1983) is the former head coach of the Virginia Cavaliers women's basketball and Missouri State Lady Bears basketball team.

== Hofstra statistics ==
Legend
GP	Games played	GS	Games started	MPG	Minutes per game
FG%	Field goal percentage	3P%	3-point field goal percentage	FT%	Free throw percentage
RPG	Rebounds per game	APG	Assists per game	SPG	Steals per game
BPG	Blocks per game	PPG	Points per game	**Bold**	Career high

Year	Team	GP	Points	FG%	3P%	FT%	RPG	APG	SPG	BPG	PPG
2001–02	Hofstra	9	14	50.0%	0.0%	–	2.4	0.1	0.4	0.2	1.6
2002–03	Hofstra	29	**329**	53.8%	0.0%	55.1%	**7.0**	1.0	**1.0**	0.3	11.3
2003–04	Hofstra	26	312	55.7%	0.0%	47.6%	6.5	**1.1**	0.8	0.8	**12.0**
2004–05	Hofstra	Medical redshirt									
2005–06	Hofstra	**31**	315	**56.1%**	0.0%	**56.9%**	5.6	0.9	1.0	**0.8**	10.2
Career		95	970	55.1%	0.0%	52.6%	6.0	0.9	0.9	0.6	102

== Missouri State ==
Amaka Agugua-Hamilton was introduced as the head coach of the Missouri State Lady Bears basketball program on April 17, 2019. Agugua-Hamilton replaced Kellie Harper who left to become the head coach of her alma mater, the Tennessee Lady Vols. Agugua-Hamilton became the first African- American female head coach for any sport at Missouri State.

=== Inaugural Season ===
During her inaugural season with the Lady Bears Agugua-Hamilton lead the team to a 26–4 record including a 16–2 mark in the Missouri Valley Conference. The Lady Bears finished the 2019–2020 season ranked 19th in the USA Today Coaches Poll and 23rd by the AP and 8th in the RPI.

The 26 wins by Agugua-Hamilton set the Missouri Valley Conference record for wins by a first year women's basketball coach. Agugua-Hamilton is also the first coach to win an outright MVC title during her rookie campaign. At the conclusion of the 2020 season Agugua-Hamilton was named the Missouri Valley Conference Coach of the Year. The Women's Basketball Coaches Association also named Agugua-Hamilton the Spalding Maggie Dixon Rookie Coach of the Year.

== Virginia ==
Amaka Agugua-Hamilton was introduced as the head coach of the Virginia Cavaliers women's basketball program on March 21, 2022. Agugua-Hamilton led the Cavaliers to a perfect 11–0 start during non-conference play in her first season as head coach, but the team faltered in ACC play, going 4–14 to finish the season 15–15.

== Personal life ==
Agugua-Hamilton is a native of Herndon, Virginia and is a 2005 graduate of Hofstra University. She married Billy Hamilton in 2017 and together have a son Eze, born in April 2018. She is a Christian.

== Head coaching record ==
Record table
Season	Team	Overall	Conference	Standing	Postseason
**Missouri State Lady Bears** (Missouri Valley Conference) (2019–2022)
2019–20	Missouri State	26–4	16–2	1st	Postseason not held due to COVID-19
2020–21	Missouri State	23–3	16–0	1st	NCAA Sweet Sixteen
2021–22	Missouri State	25–8	14–4	2nd	NCAA First Round
Missouri State:		74–15 (.831)	46–6 (.885)		
**Virginia Cavaliers** (Atlantic Coast Conference) (2022–2026)
2022–23	Virginia	15–15	4–14	T–13th	
2023–24	Virginia	16–16	7–11	T–10th	WBIT Second Round
2024–25	Virginia	17–15	8–10	T–10th	
2025–26	Virginia	22–12	11–7	T-8th	NCAA Sweet Sixteen
Virginia:		70–58 (.547)	30–42 (.417)		
Total:		143–73 (.662)			
National champion Postseason invitational champion Conference regular season champion Conference regular season and conference tournament champion Division regular season champion Division regular season and conference tournament champion Conference tournament champion
