= Women's Basketball Invitation Tournament =

Postseason women's college basketball tournament

- Current season, competition or edition: 2026 Women's Basketball Invitation Tournament
- Sport: Basketball
- Founded: 2024
- Founder: NCAA
- First season: 2024
- No. of teams: 32
- Country: United States
- Most recent champion: Columbia
- Most titles: Illinois, Minnesota, Columbia (1)
- Broadcaster: ESPN+/ESPN2/ESPNU
- Related competitions: NCAA Division I women's basketball tournament Women's National Invitation Tournament; Women's Basketball Invitational
- Website: www.ncaa.com/championships/basketball-women/wbit

The Women's Basketball Invitation Tournament (WBIT) is a women's national college basketball tournament inaugurated in 2024. It is operated in a similar fashion to the men's college National Invitation Tournament (NIT) and is run by the National Collegiate Athletic Association (NCAA). The similarly-titled Women's National Invitation Tournament (WNIT) is unaffiliated with the NCAA.

== Format ==
The NCAA announced the creation of the WBIT on July 17, 2023, with the first edition held in 2024. The WBIT supplies an additional 32 funded opportunities for postseason play, providing gender parity to men's college basketball, which has the NCAA-owned NIT. The existing non-NCAA postseason tournaments, the Women's National Invitation Tournament and Women's Basketball Invitational, are "pay-to-play" events where teams must pay a fee to the event sponsor, in addition to travel costs.

The "first four out" of the NCAA tournament will be the top four seeds of the WBIT. All regular season champions who were not otherwise invited to the NCAA tournament, and are eligible for NCAA-sponsored postseason play, (Note: In the first season of the WBIT, the Ohio Valley Conference regular-season and tournament titles were won by Southern Indiana, which was ineligible for the NCAA tournament or WBIT due to being in the second year of a four-year transition (later shortened to three years) from NCAA Division II.) are automatically selected for the WBIT, similar to the rule in the men's NIT prior to 2024. The top eight schools host first and second-round games. Only the top 16 teams are seeded, with the remaining 16 teams placed as close to their schools as possible. Unlike the NCAA tournament, geographical considerations for each team on a given seed line are considered, so that the No. 2 seeds are placed as close to the No. 1 seeds, and so forth. The higher seeded school will be able to have home court advantage until the final four round, which is held at a designated site. For the first two iterations of the tournament, this site was Hinkle Fieldhouse at Butler University in Indianapolis, which also hosted the semifinals and final of the National Invitation Tournament. The 2026 and 2027 semifinals and final will be held at Wichita State University's Charles Koch Arena in Wichita, Kansas. The 2028 semifinals and final will return to Indianapolis, and will be held alongside the women's championship games for all three NCAA divisions. The WBIT venue has yet to be announced.

== Postseason WBIT champions ==
Year	Champion	Score	Runner-up	Other semifinalists	MVP	Semifinal/final site
2024	Illinois	71–57	Villanova	Penn State, Washington State	Makira Cook, Illinois	Hinkle Fieldhouse (Indianapolis, IN)
2025	Minnesota	75–63	Belmont	Florida, Villanova	Tori McKinney, Minnesota	Hinkle Fieldhouse (Indianapolis, IN)
2026	Columbia	81–64	BYU	Kansas, Wisconsin	Riley Weiss, Columbia	Charles Koch Arena (Wichita, KS)
2027						Charles Koch Arena (Wichita, KS)
2028						Venue TBA (Indianapolis, IN)

== See also ==
- NCAA Division I women's basketball tournament
- Women's Basketball Invitational
- Women's National Invitation Tournament
