= 2020–21 Valparaiso University women's basketball team =

Intercollegiate basketball season

2020–21 Valparaiso University women's basketball
- Conference: Missouri Valley Conference
- Record: 11–12 (7–9 MVC)
- Head coach: Mary Evans (3rd season)
- Assistant coaches: Gabby Johnson; Dani Franklin; Mark Schwitznagel
- Home arena: Athletics–Recreation Center

2020–21 Missouri Valley Conference women's basketball standings
	Conf.				Overall
Team	W		L	PCT	W		L	PCT
No. 20 Missouri State	16	–	0	1.000	23	–	4	.852
Drake	13	–	5	.722	18	–	12	.600
Illinois State	12	–	6	.667	16	–	9	.640
Northern Iowa	11	–	7	.611	17	–	13	.567
Bradley†	10	–	8	.556	17	–	12	.586
Loyola–Chicago	8	–	10	.444	12	–	15	.444
Valparaiso	7	–	9	.438	12	–	13	.480
Southern Illinois	5	–	13	.278	9	–	16	.360
Indiana State	2	–	12	.143	5	–	15	.250
Evansville	2	–	16	.111	6	–	18	.250
† 2021 MVC tournament winner As of July 7, 2024; Rankings from AP poll

The 2020–21 Valparaiso University women's basketball team represented Valparaiso University during the 2020–21 NCAA Division I women's basketball season. The Crusaders, led by third-year head coach Mary Evans, played their home games at the Athletics–Recreation Center as members of the Missouri Valley Conference.

On February 11, 2021, the university announced that it is dropping the team name Crusaders, the school mascot and all logos associated with the term because of the "negative connotation and violence associated with the Crusader imagery", and because some hate groups also used the term.
