= 2020–21 Northern Iowa Panthers women's basketball team =

American college basketball season

2020–21 Northern Iowa Panthers women's basketball
- Conference: Missouri Valley Conference
- Record: 17-13 (11-7 MVC)
- Head coach: Tanya Warren (14th season)
- Assistant coaches: Brad Nelson; Steven Fennelly
- Home arena: McLeod Center

2020–21 Missouri Valley Conference women's basketball standings
	Conf.				Overall
Team	W		L	PCT	W		L	PCT
No. 20 Missouri State	16	–	0	1.000	23	–	4	.852
Drake	13	–	5	.722	18	–	12	.600
Illinois State	12	–	6	.667	16	–	9	.640
Northern Iowa	11	–	7	.611	17	–	13	.567
Bradley†	10	–	8	.556	17	–	12	.586
Loyola–Chicago	8	–	10	.444	12	–	15	.444
Valparaiso	7	–	9	.438	12	–	13	.480
Southern Illinois	5	–	13	.278	9	–	16	.360
Indiana State	2	–	12	.143	5	–	15	.250
Evansville	2	–	16	.111	6	–	18	.250
† 2021 MVC tournament winner As of July 7, 2024; Rankings from AP poll

The 2020–21 Northern Iowa Panthers women's basketball team represented the University of Northern Iowa during the 2020-21 NCAA Division I women's basketball season. The Panthers were led by head coach Tanya Warren in her fourteenth season, and played their home games at the McLeod Center as a member of the Missouri Valley Conference.

== Previous season ==
The Panthers finished the 2019-20 season with an 18–11 record, including 10–8 in Missouri Valley Conference play. They were scheduled to play Illinois State in the quarterfinals of the MVC Tournament, but the game, as well as the rest of the season, were canceled due to COVID-19.

== Offseason ==
=== Departures ===
Name	Number	Pos.	Height	Year	Hometown	Reason for departure
Rose Simon-Ressler	22	G	5'10"	Senior	Epworth, IA	Graduated
Kristina Cavey	31	G	5'11"	Grad Student	Berthoud, CO	Graduated
Heidi Hillyard	32	F	6'0"	Senior	Burlington, IA	Graduated
Abby Gerrits	41	G	5'10"	Senior	Pewaukee, WI	Graduated
Kaitlin Winston	43	F	6'0"	Freshman	Farmington, MN	Departed Program

== Roster ==
2020–21 Northern Iowa Panthers women's basketball team
Players
Coaches

Pos.	#	Name	Height	Year	Previous school	Hometown
G	0	Maya McDermott	5 ft 6 in (1.68 m)	Fr	Johnston	Johnston, IA
G	2	Cailyn Morgan	5 ft 10 in (1.78 m)	So	Iowa City West	Coralville, IA
G	3	Karli Rucker	5 ft 6 in (1.68 m)	Sr	North Scott	Eldridge, IA
G	4	Emerson Green	5 ft 10 in (1.78 m)	Fr	Cedar Falls	Cedar Falls, IA
G	5	Nicole Kroeger	5 ft 9 in (1.75 m)	Sr	Palmyra	Palmyra, MO
F	11	Bre Gunnels	6 ft 1 in (1.85 m)	Sr	Southeast	Kansas City, MO
G	12	Kam Finley	5 ft 9 in (1.75 m)	Jr	Cedar Falls	Cedar Falls, IA
C	21	Taryn McKee	6 ft 3 in (1.91 m)	Fr	Van Buren Community	Keosauqua, IA
G	24	Kayba Laube	5 ft 9 in (1.75 m)	Fr	Marion	Marion, IA
F	25	Sara McCullough	6 ft 0 in (1.83 m)	RS Fr	Ankeny	Ankeny, IA
C	30	Cynthia Wolf	6 ft 3 in (1.91 m)	Jr	Cedar Falls	Cedar Falls, IA
F	33	Kiana Barney	6 ft 1 in (1.85 m)	RS So	Cedar Falls	Cedar Falls, IA
F	42	Grace Boffeli	6 ft 1 in (1.85 m)	Fr	North Scott	Eldridge, IA
F	50	Megan Maahs	6 ft 1 in (1.85 m)	RS Sr	Western Dubuque	Epworth, IA

Head coach

- Tanya Warren (Creighton)

Assistant coach(es)

- Brad Nelson (Oregon)
- Steven Fennelly (Iowa State)

Legend

- (C) Team captain
- (S) Suspended
- (I) Ineligible
- (W) Walk-on
- Injured
- Current redshirt

Roster
Last update: March 15, 2022

== Schedule and results ==
Date time, TV	Rank^{#}	Opponent^{#}	Result	Record	High points	High rebounds	High assists	Site (attendance) city, state
Non-conference Regular Season
November 25, 2020*; 6:30 pm, B1G+		at Iowa	L 81-96	0-1	22 – Finley	8 – Gunnels	5 – Kroeger	Carver-Hawkeye Arena (365); Iowa City, IA
November 28, 2020*; 2:00 pm, ESPN+		Creighton	W 55-52	1-1	12 – Rucker	9 – Maahs	4 – Green	McLeod Center (215); Cedar Falls, IA
December 2, 2020*; 6:30 pm, ESPN3		at North Dakota State	L 68-85	1-2	13 – Kroeger	6 – Tied	4 – Rucker	Scheels Center (51); Fargo, ND
December 6, 2020*; 5:00 pm, ESPN+		at Wichita State	W 93-91 ^{2OT}	2-2	18 – Gunnels	11 – Gunnels	5 – Wolf	Charles Koch Arena; Wichita, KS
December 12, 2020*; 3:00 pm, ESPN3		No. 21 South Dakota State	W 65-48	3-2	18 – Rucker	8 – Wolf	3 – Tied	McLeod Center (250); Cedar Falls, IA
December 15, 2020*; 6:30 pm, ESPN+		Iowa State	L 61-67	3-3	12 – Tied	9 – Green	3 – Finley	McLeod Center (250); Cedar Falls, IA
December 23, 2020*; 2:00 pm, ESPN3		at South Dakota State	L 63-74	3-4	12 – Finley	6 – Maahs	3 – McDermott	Frost Arena (235); Brookings, SD
Missouri Valley Conference Regular Season
January 1, 2021; 2:00 pm		Illinois State	W 82-71	4-4 (1-0)	18 – Gunnels	9 – Gunnels	5 – Rucker	McLeod Center (519); Cedar Falls, IA
January 2, 2021; 2:00 pm, ESPN3		Illinois State	W 72-67	5-4 (2-0)	19 – Rucker	14 – Gunnels	3 – Rucker	McLeod Center (471); Cedar Falls, IA
January 7, 2021; 6:00 pm, ESPN3		at Valparaiso	L 56-63	5-5 (2-1)	18 – Rucker	10 – Wolf	3 – Kroeger	Athletics-Recreation Center (57); Valparaiso, IN
January 8, 2021; 6:00 pm, ESPN3		at Valparaiso	W 79-71	6-5 (3-1)	32 – Rucker	5 – Tied	4 – Tied	Athletics-Recreation Center (75); Valparaiso, IN
January 15, 2021; 6:00 pm, ESPN3		Missouri State	L 51-70	6-6 (3-2)	11 – Rucker	7 – Gunnels	5 – Rucker	McLeod Center (462); Cedar Falls, IA
January 16, 2021; 4:00 pm, ESPN+		Missouri State	L 60-64	6-7 (3-3)	21 – Finley	5 – Wolf	3 – Tied	McLeod Center (492); Cedar Falls, IA
January 22, 2021; 6:00 pm, ESPN+		at Indiana State	W 95-69	7-7 (4-3)	20 – McDermott	5 – Maahs	4 – Tied	Hulman Center (60); Terre Haute, IN
January 23, 2021; 4:00 pm, ESPN+		at Indiana State	W 88-53	8-7 (5-3)	13 – Gunnels	8 – Maahs	7 – McDermott	Hulman Center (85); Terre Haute, IN
January 27, 2021; 6:00 pm, ESPN+		at Drake	L 79-96	8-8 (5-4)	18 – Wolf	5 – Tied	4 – Rucker	Knapp Center (378); Des Moines, IA
February 12, 2021; 6:00 pm, ESPN3		at Bradley	W 73-72	9-8 (6-4)	25 – Finley	16 – Gunnels	5 – Rucker	Renaissance Coliseum (50); Peoria, IL
February 13, 2021; 4:02 pm, ESPN3		at Bradley	L 63-78	9-9 (6-5)	19 – Rucker	8 – Maahs	3 – Rucker	Renaissance Coliseum; Peoria, IL
February 19, 2021; 6:00 pm, ESPN3		Loyola Chicago	W 78-51	10-9 (7-5)	13 – Wolf	12 – Wolf	7 – Rucker	McLeod Center (325); Cedar Falls, IA
February 20, 2021; 4:00 pm, ESPN3		Loyola Chicago	L 64-66 ^{OT}	10-10 (7-6)	13 – Tied	5 – Kroeger	9 – Rucker	McLeod Center (533); Cedar Falls, IA
February 24, 2021; 6:00 pm, ESPN3		Drake	L 56-77	10-11 (7-7)	14 – Laube	6 – Gunnels	5 – Rucker	McLeod Center (349); Cedar Falls, IA
February 27, 2021; 1:00 pm, ESPN3		Evansville	W 67-31	11-11 (8-7)	19 – Rucker	11 – Tied	7 – Rucker	McLeod Center (488); Cedar Falls, IA
February 28, 2021; 12:00 pm, ESPN3		Evansville	W 96-48	12-11 (9-7)	17 – Finley	8 – Maahs	9 – McDermott	McLeod Center (479); Cedar Falls, IA
March 5, 2021; 4:00 pm		at Southern Illinois	W 67-56	13-11 (10-7)	23 – Rucker	12 – Gunnels	4 – Maahs	Banterra Center; Carbondale, IL
March 6, 2021; 4:00 pm		at Southern Illinois	W 64-41	14-11 (11-7)	14 – Maahs	9 – Gunnels	5 – McDermott	Banterra Center; Carbondale, IL
Missouri Valley Conference tournament
March 12, 2021; 2:00 pm, ESPN+	(4)	vs. (5) Bradley; Quarterfinals	L 59-62	14-12	19 – Rucker	11 – Maahs	3 – Tied	TaxSlayer Center; Moline, IL
Women's National Invitation Tournament
March 19, 2021; 11:00 am, FloHoops		vs. Dayton; First Round	W 70-56	15-12	23 – Finley	9 – Gunnels	5 – Rucker	UW Health Sports Factory (115); Rockford, IL
March 20, 2021; 5:00 pm, FloHoops		vs. Creighton; Second Round	W 64-63	16-12	20 – Maahs	9 – Rucker	6 – Finley	UW Health Sports Factory (91); Rockford, IL
March 22, 2021; 7:00 pm, FloHoops		vs. Saint Louis; Quarterfinals	W 58-50	17-12	14 – Finley	11 – Gunnels	3 – Finley	UW Health Sports Factory (143); Rockford, IL
March 26, 2021; 7:00 pm, FloHoops		vs. Ole Miss; Semifinals	L 50-60	17-13	16 – Rucker	8 – Maahs	5 – Rucker	My Town Movers Fieldhouse (600); Collierville, TN
*Non-conference game. ^{#}Rankings from AP Poll. (#) Tournament seedings in parentheses. All times are in Central Time. Source:
