= 2021 Missouri Valley Conference women's basketball tournament =

- Classification: Division I
- Season: 2020–21
- Teams: 10
- Site: TaxSlayer Center; Moline, Illinois
- Champions: Bradley (1st title)
- Winning coach: Andrea Gorski (1st title)
- Television: ESPN+

2020–21 Missouri Valley Conference women's basketball standings
	Conf.				Overall
Team	W		L	PCT	W		L	PCT
No. 20 Missouri State	16	–	0	1.000	23	–	4	.852
Drake	13	–	5	.722	18	–	12	.600
Illinois State	12	–	6	.667	16	–	9	.640
Northern Iowa	11	–	7	.611	17	–	13	.567
Bradley†	10	–	8	.556	17	–	12	.586
Loyola–Chicago	8	–	10	.444	12	–	15	.444
Valparaiso	7	–	9	.438	12	–	13	.480
Southern Illinois	5	–	13	.278	9	–	16	.360
Indiana State	2	–	12	.143	5	–	15	.250
Evansville	2	–	16	.111	6	–	18	.250
† 2021 MVC tournament winner As of July 7, 2024; Rankings from AP poll

The 2021 Missouri Valley Conference women's basketball tournament, promoted as Hoops in the Heartland, was part of the 2020–21 NCAA Division I women's basketball season and was played in Moline, Illinois, March 11–14, 2021, at the TaxSlayer Center. On March 13, prior to the semifinal game between Missouri State and Bradley, Missouri State withdrew from the tournament. The remaining teams were reseeded, Bradley was rescheduled to play Loyola Chicago, and top-seeded Drake advanced to the finals, awaiting their opponent. Bradley won the tournament, its first title, receiving the Missouri Valley Conference's automatic bid to the 2021 NCAA tournament.

== Seeds ==
2021 MVC Women's Basketball Tournament seeds
Seed	School	Conf.	Over.
1	Missouri State‡#	16–0	20–2
2	Drake#	13–5	15–10
3	Illinois State#	12–6	15–6
4	UNI	11–7	14–11
5	Bradley#	10–8	14–11
6	Loyola Chicago#	8–10	10–12
7	Valparaiso	7–9	11–12
8	Southern Illinois	5–13	8–15
9	Indiana State	2–12	5–14
10	Evansville	2–16	6–17
‡ – Missouri Valley Conference regular season champions, and tournament No. 1 seed. # - Received a single-bye in the conference tournament. Overall records include all games played in the Missouri Valley Conference tournament.

== Schedule ==
Session	Game	Time	Matchup	Score	Television
First round – Thursday, March 11
1	1	4:30 pm	No. 8 Southern Illinois vs. No. 9 Indiana State	90–89^{OT}	ESPN+
1	2	7:30 pm	No. 7 Valparaiso vs. No. 10 Evansville	65–52	ESPN+
Quarterfinals – Friday, March 12
2	3	11:00 am	No. 1 Missouri State vs. No. 8 Southern Illinois	70–59	ESPN+
2	4	2:00 pm	No. 4 UNI vs. No. 5 Bradley	59–62	ESPN+
3	5	5:00 pm	No. 2 Drake vs. No. 7 Valparaiso	71–60	ESPN+
3	6	8:00 pm	No. 3 Illinois State vs. No. 6 Loyola Chicago	60–61	ESPN+
Semifinals – Saturday, March 13
4	7	1:00 pm	No. 1 Missouri State vs. No. 2 Drake	Canceled	ESPN+
4	8	6:00 pm	No. 5 Bradley vs. No. 6 Loyola Chicago	70–56	ESPN+
Championship – Sunday, March 14
5	9	4:00 pm	No. 2 Drake vs. No. 5 Bradley	70–78	ESPN+
Game times in CT. Rankings denote tournament seed.

== Tournament bracket ==
First round Thursday, March 11; ESPN+
8	Southern Illinois	90*
9	Indiana State	89
7	Valparaiso	65
10	Evansville	52

Quarterfinals; Friday, March 12; ESPN+
1	Missouri State	70
8	Southern Illinois	59
4	UNI	59
5	Bradley	62
2	Drake	71
7	Valparaiso	60
3	Illinois State	60
6	Loyola Chicago	61

Semifinals; Saturday, March 13; ESPN+
1	Missouri State
2	Drake	NC
5	Bradley	70
6	Loyola Chicago	56

Championship; Sunday, March 14; ESPN+
2	Drake	70
5	Bradley	78

* denotes overtime

== See also ==
- 2021 Missouri Valley Conference men's basketball tournament
