= 2021 Summit League women's basketball tournament =

- Tournament logo
- Classification: Division I
- Season: 2020–21
- Teams: 8
- Site: Sanford Pentagon; Sioux Falls, South Dakota
- Champions: South Dakota (3rd title)
- Winning coach: Dawn Plitzuweit (2nd title)
- MVP: Chloe Lamb (South Dakota)
- Television: MidcoSN; ESPN+ ESPNU

2020–21 Summit League women's basketball standings
	Conf.				Overall
Team	W		L	PCT	W		L	PCT
No. 25 South Dakota State	14	–	0	1.000	21	–	4	.840
South Dakota†	12	–	2	.857	19	–	6	.760
North Dakota State	9	–	7	.563	15	–	9	.625
Kansas City	7	–	8	.467	10	–	12	.455
Western Illinois	6	–	8	.429	8	–	16	.333
Denver	5	–	9	.357	7	–	16	.304
Omaha	4	–	8	.333	7	–	13	.350
Oral Roberts	4	–	8	.333	6	–	15	.286
North Dakota	2	–	13	.133	2	–	19	.095
† 2021 Summit League tournament winner As of December 2, 2021; Rankings from AP poll

The 2021 Summit League women's basketball tournament is a post-season women's basketball tournament for The Summit League. The tournament took place March 6–9, 2021, at the Sanford Pentagon in Sioux Falls, South Dakota. The top eight teams in the final standings qualified for the tournament.

== Seeds ==
The top eight teams by conference record in the Summit League were eligible to compete in the conference tournament. Teams were seeded by record within the conference, with a tiebreaker system to seed teams with identical conference records.

Seed	School	Conference Record	Tiebreaker
1	South Dakota State	14–0	
2	South Dakota	12–2	
3	North Dakota State	9–7	
4	Kansas City	7–8	
5	Western Illinois	6–8	
6	Denver	5–9	
7	Oral Roberts	4–8	1–1 vs. KC
8	Omaha	4–8	0–2 vs. KC

== Schedule and results ==
Game	Time	Matchup	Score	Television
Quarterfinals – Saturday, March 6
1	11:45 AM	#1 South Dakota State vs. #8 Omaha	40-52	MidcosSN/ ESPN+
2	2:45 PM	#2 South Dakota vs. #7 Oral Roberts	89-66	MidcosSN/ ESPN+
Quarterfinals – Sunday, March 7
3	11:45 AM	#4 Kansas City vs. #5 Western Illinois	59-60	MidcosSN/ ESPN+
4	2:45 PM	#3 North Dakota State vs. #6 Denver	79-67	MidcosSN/ ESPN+
Semifinals – Monday, March 8
5	11:45 AM	#8 Omaha vs. #5 Western Illinois	69-55	MidcosSN/ ESPN+
6	2:45 PM	#2 South Dakota vs. #3 North Dakota State	81-55	MidcosSN/ ESPN+
Final – Tuesday, March 9
7	1:00 PM	#8 Omaha vs. #2 South Dakota	66-43	ESPNU
*Game times in CST. Rankings denote tournament seed

== Bracket ==
Quarterfinals; March 6 & 7 MidcoSN/ESPN+
1	South Dakota State	40
8	Omaha	52
4	Kansas City	59
5	Western Illinois	60
2	South Dakota	89
7	Oral Roberts	66
3	North Dakota State	79
6	Denver	67

Semifinals; March 8 MidcoSN/ESPN+
8	Omaha	69
5	Western Illinois	55
2	South Dakota	81
3	North Dakota State	55

Championship; March 9 ESPNU
8	Omaha	43
2	South Dakota	66
