= 2020–21 Missouri State Lady Bears basketball team =

Women's college basketball season

2020–21 Missouri State Lady Bears basketball

Missouri Valley Conference regular season

NCAA tournament, Sweet 16
- Conference: Missouri Valley Conference

Ranking
- Coaches: No. 14
- AP: No. 20
- Record: 23–3 (16–0 The Valley)
- Head coach: Amaka Agugua-Hamilton (2nd season)
- Assistant coaches: Alysiah Bond; Tori Jankoska; CJ Jones
- Home arena: JQH Arena

2020–21 Missouri Valley Conference women's basketball standings
	Conf.				Overall
Team	W		L	PCT	W		L	PCT
No. 20 Missouri State	16	–	0	1.000	23	–	4	.852
Drake	13	–	5	.722	18	–	12	.600
Illinois State	12	–	6	.667	16	–	9	.640
Northern Iowa	11	–	7	.611	17	–	13	.567
Bradley†	10	–	8	.556	17	–	12	.586
Loyola–Chicago	8	–	10	.444	12	–	15	.444
Valparaiso	7	–	9	.438	12	–	13	.480
Southern Illinois	5	–	13	.278	9	–	16	.360
Indiana State	2	–	12	.143	5	–	15	.250
Evansville	2	–	16	.111	6	–	18	.250
† 2021 MVC tournament winner As of July 7, 2024; Rankings from AP poll

The 2020–21 Missouri State Lady Bears basketball team represented Missouri State University during the 2020–21 NCAA Division I women's basketball season. The Lady Bears, led by second-year head coach Amaka Agugua-Hamilton, played their home games at JQH Arena and were members of the Missouri Valley Conference.

They finished the season 23–3 and 16–0 in conference play to finish as Missouri Valley Conference champions. As the first seed in the Missouri Valley tournament, they defeated Southern Illinois in the quarterfinals before having to forfeit their semifinal game. They received an at-large bid to the NCAA tournament and were the fifth seed in the Alamo Regional. They defeated twelve seed UC Davis and thirteen seed Wright State before falling to the first seed Stanford in the Sweet Sixteen.

== Previous season ==
The Lady Bears finished the season 26–4, 16–2 in MVC play to finish in first place. The Missouri Valley tournament and NCAA tournament were cancelled, due to the COVID-19 outbreak.

== Roster ==
2020–21 Missouri State Bears women's basketball team
Players
Coaches

Pos.	#	Name	Height	Year	Previous school	Hometown
F	0	Abi Jackson	6 ft 3 in (1.91 m)	Sr	Little Rock Central; Auburn	Little Rock, AR
G	2	Elle Ruffridge	5 ft 3 in (1.6 m)	Sr	Pocahontas Area	Pocahontas, IA
F	4	Abby Hipp	6 ft 2 in (1.88 m)	Sr	St. Pius X	Kansas City, MO
G	11	Brice Calip	5 ft 8 in (1.73 m)	Sr	Sapulpa	Sapulpa, OK
G	21	Sydney Wilson	5 ft 11 in (1.8 m)	Jr	Olathe East	Overland Park, KS
G	22	Paige Rocca	5 ft 9 in (1.75 m)	Fr	Iowa City	Iowa City, IA
G	23	Mya Bhinhar	5 ft 9 in (1.75 m)	Jr	Owasso High School	Owasso, OK
G	24	Bri Ellis	5 ft 7 in (1.7 m)	Sr	Rock Bridge	Columbia, MO
F	32	Jasmine Franklin	6 ft 1 in (1.85 m)	Jr	Fayetteville	Fayetteville, AR
G	34	Sydney Manning	5 ft 9 in (1.75 m)	Jr	Cashion	Edmond, OK
C	50	Emily Gartner	6 ft 4 in (1.93 m)	Sr	Hiawatha	Hiawatha, KS

Head coach

- Amaka Agugua-Hamilton (Hofstra)

Assistant coach(es)

- Tori Jankoska (Michigan State)
- Alysiah Bond (Ohio State)
- CJ Jones (Francis Marion)

Legend

- (C) Team captain
- (S) Suspended
- (I) Ineligible
- (W) Walk-on
- Injured
- Current redshirt

Roster
Last update: July 9, 2021

== Schedule ==
Date time, TV	Rank^{#}	Opponent^{#}	Result	Record	Site (attendance) city, state
Non-conference regular season
November 27, 2020*; 4:30 p.m., FloHoops	No. 24	at Florida Gulf Coast; Gulf Coast Showcase	W 74–49	1–0	Alico Arena (0); Fort Myers, FL
November 28, 2020*; 4:30 p.m., FloHoops	No. 24	vs. No. 12 Maryland; Gulf Coast Showcase	W 81–72	2–0	Alico Arena (0); Fort Myers, FL
November 29, 2020*; 1:30 p.m., FloHoops	No. 24	vs. Wake Forest; Gulf Coast Showcase	L 59–68	2–1	Alico Arena (0); Fort Myers, FL
December 5, 2020*; 1:00 p.m.	No. 21	Tulsa	Canceled		JQH Arena; Springfield, MO
December 7, 2020*; 7:00 p.m., ESPN3	No. 21	Lincoln	W 100–38	3–1	JQH Arena (1,006); Springfield, MO
December 14, 2020*; 7:00 p.m., SECN+	No. 20	at Missouri	W 72–58	4–1	Mizzou Arena (1,743); Columbia, MO
December 19, 2020*; 1:00 p.m., ESPN3	No. 20	South Dakota State	L 52–60	4–2	JQH Arena (1,362); Springfield, MO
Missouri Valley conference season
January 15, 2021; 6:00 p.m., ESPN3		at Northern Iowa	W 70–51	5–2 (1–0)	McLeod Center (462); Cedar Falls, IA
January 16, 2021; 4:00 p.m., ESPN+		at Northern Iowa	W 64–60	6–2 (2–0)	McLeod Center (492); Cedar Falls, IA
January 22, 2021; 7:00 p.m., ESPN+		Drake	W 73–72	7–2 (3–0)	JQH Arena (1,727); Springfield, MO
January 23, 2021; 5:00 p.m., ESPN+		Drake	W 78–63	8–2 (4–0)	JQH Arena (1,436); Springfield, MO
January 27, 2021; 3:00 p.m., ESPN3		Southern Illinois	W 61–44	9–2 (5–0)	JQH Arena (1,001); Springfield, MO
January 30, 2021; 1:00 p.m., ESPN+		at Valparaiso	W 61–51	10–2 (6–0)	Athletics–Recreation Center (77); Valparaiso, IN
January 31, 2021; 3:00 p.m., ESPN+		at Valparaiso	W 74–73	11–2 (7–0)	Athletics–Recreation Center (75); Valparaiso, IN
February 5, 2021; 7:00 p.m.		Indiana State	Canceled		JQH Arena; Springfield, MO
February 6, 2021; 5:00 p.m., ESPN3		Indiana State	Canceled		JQH Arena; Springfield, MO
February 12, 2021; 4:00 p.m., ESPN+	No. 25	at Illinois State	W 69–52	12–2 (8–0)	Redbird Arena (0); Normal, IL
February 13, 2021; 4:00 p.m., ESPN3	No. 25	at Illinois State	W 73–72	13–2 (9–0)	Redbird Arena (0); Normal, IL
February 19, 2021 :00 p.m., ESPN3	No. 25	Bradley	W 62–56	14–2 (10–0)	JQH Arena (1,103); Springfield, MO
February 20, 2021; 5:00 p.m., ESPN3	No. 25	Bradley	W 75–62	15–2 (11–0)	JQH Arena (1,613); Springfield, MO
February 24, 2021; 6:00 p.m., ESPN+	No. 23	at Southern Illinois	W 67–55	16–2 (12–0)	SIU Arena (50); Carbondale, IL
February 27, 2021; 5:00 p.m., ESPN+	No. 23	Loyola–Chicago	W 64–50	17–2 (13–0)	JQH Arena (1,373); Springfield, MO
February 28, 2021; 5:00 p.m., ESPN+	No. 23	Loyola–Chicago	W 59–45	18–2 (14–0)	JQH Arena (1,294); Springfield, MO
March 5, 2021; 6:00 p.m., ESPN3	No. 23	at Evansville	W 87–54	19–2 (15–0)	Meeks Family Fieldhouse (0); Evansville, IN
March 6, 2021; 6:00 p.m., ESPN3	No. 23	at Evansville	W 85–44	20–2 (16–0)	Meeks Family Fieldhouse (0); Evansville, IN
Missouri Valley women's tournament
March 12, 2021; 11:00 a.m., ESPN+	(1) No. 21	vs. (8) Southern Illinois; Quarterfinals	W 70–59	21–2	TaxSlayer Center (0); Moline, IL
March 13, 2021; 1:00 p.m., ESPN+	(1) No. 21	vs. (2) Drake; Semifinals	Canceled		TaxSlayer Center; Moline, IL
NCAA tournament
March 22, 2021; 6:30 p.m., ESPNU	(5 A) No. 20	vs. (12 A) UC Davis; First Round	W 70–51	22–2	Bill Greehey Arena (0); San Antonio, TX
March 24, 2021; 2:00 p.m., ESPNU	(5 A) No. 20	vs. (13 A) Wright State; Second Round	W 64–39	23–2	Convocation Center (0); San Antonio, TX
March 28, 2021; 2:00 p.m., ABC	(5 A) No. 20	vs. (1 A) No. 2 Stanford; Sweet 16	L 62–89	23–3	Alamodome (0); San Antonio, TX
*Non-conference game. ^{#}Rankings from AP Poll. (#) Tournament seedings in parentheses. A=Alamo. All times are in Central Time.

== Rankings ==
+ Regular season polls	Poll	Pre- season	Week 2	Week 3	Week 4	Week 5	Week 6	Week 7	Week 8	Week 9	Week 10	Week 11	Week 12	Week 13	Week 14	Week 15	Week 16	Final
AP	24	21	21	20	24	24	25	RV	RV	RV	RV	25	25	23	23	21	20	
Coaches	25	22	20	24	24	25	25	25	25	23	23	20	19т	17	17	17	14	

Legend
	Increase in ranking
	Decrease in ranking
	Not ranked previous week
(RV)	Received votes
(NR)	Not ranked and did not receive votes

The Coaches Poll did not release a Week 2 poll, and the AP Poll did not release a poll after the NCAA Tournament.

== See also ==
- 2020–21 Missouri State Bears basketball team
