= 2020 Summit League women's basketball tournament =

- Classification: Division I
- Season: 2019–20
- Teams: 8
- Site: Denny Sanford Premier Center; Sioux Falls, South Dakota
- Champions: South Dakota (2nd title)
- Winning coach: Dawn Plitzuweit (1st title)
- MVP: Hannah Sjerven (South Dakota)
- Television: MidcoSN; ESPN+ ESPNU

2019–20 Summit League women's basketball standings
	Conf.				Overall
Team	W		L	PCT	W		L	PCT
No. 17 South Dakota †	16	–	0	1.000	28	–	2	.933
South Dakota State	13	–	3	.813	22	–	9	.710
Denver	9	–	7	.563	15	–	15	.500
Western Illinois	9	–	7	.563	15	–	15	.500
Oral Roberts	9	–	7	.563	15	–	15	.500
North Dakota State	7	–	9	.438	11	–	18	.379
North Dakota	6	–	10	.375	15	–	15	.500
Omaha	2	–	14	.125	7	–	23	.233
Purdue Fort Wayne	1	–	15	.063	5	–	24	.172
† 2020 Summit League tournament winner Rankings from AP poll

The 2020 Summit League women's basketball tournament was a post-season women's basketball tournament for The Summit League. The tournament took place March 7–10, 2020, at the Denny Sanford Premier Center in Sioux Falls, South Dakota. The top eight teams in the final standings qualified for the tournament. South Dakota won the tournament and earned an automatic bid to the 2020 NCAA Division I women's basketball tournament.

== Seeds ==
The top eight teams by conference record in the Summit League are eligible to compete in the conference tournament. Teams are to be seeded by record within the conference, with a tiebreaker system to seed teams with identical conference records.

Seed	School	Conference Record	Tiebreaker
1	South Dakota	16–0	
2	South Dakota State	13–3	
3	Denver	9–7	1–1 vs. SDSU
4	Oral Roberts	9–7	0–2 vs. SDSU, 2–0 vs. ND
5	Western Illinois	9–7	0–2 vs. SDSU, 1–1 vs. ND
6	North Dakota State	7–9	
7	North Dakota	6–10	
8	Omaha	2–14	

== Schedule and results ==
Game	Time	Matchup	Score	Television
Quarterfinals – Saturday, March 7
1	12:00 pm	#1 South Dakota vs. #8 Omaha	99–40	MidcosSN/ ESPN+
2	2:30 pm	#2 South Dakota State vs. #7 North Dakota	72–43	MidcosSN/ ESPN+
Quarterfinals – Sunday, March 8
3	12:00 pm	#4 Oral Roberts vs. #5 Western Illinois	74–66	MidcosSN/ ESPN+
4	2:00 pm	#3 Denver vs. #6 North Dakota State	72–68	MidcosSN/ ESPN+
Semifinals – Monday, March 9
5	12:00 pm	#1 South Dakota vs. #4 Oral Roberts	65–43	MidcosSN/ ESPN+
6	2:30 pm	#2 South Dakota State vs. #6 North Dakota State	76–56	MidcosSN/ ESPN+
Final – Tuesday, March 10
7	1:00 pm	#1 South Dakota vs. #2 South Dakota State	63–58	ESPNU
*Game times in CST. Rankings denote tournament seed

== Bracket ==
Quarterfinals; March 7 & 8 MidcoSN/ESPN+
1	South Dakota	99
8	Omaha	40
4	Oral Roberts	74
5	Western Illinois	66
2	South Dakota State	72
7	North Dakota	43
3	Denver	68
6	North Dakota State	72

Semifinals; March 9 MidcoSN/ESPN+
1	South Dakota	65
4	Oral Roberts	43
2	South Dakota State	76
6	North Dakota State	56

Championship; March 10; ESPNU
1	South Dakota	63
2	South Dakota State	58
