= Vought (surname) =

Vought is a surname, and may refer to:

- Chance M. Vought (1890–1930), American aviation pioneer, engineer, and founder of the Vought company
- Russell Vought (born 1976), American political organizer and government official
- Sabra Wilbur Vought (May 23, 1877 – March 2, 1942), American academic librarian and federal official

== See also ==
- Caroline Vout, classicit
- Vaught
