= Dawn Plitzuweit =

American basketball coach (born 1972)

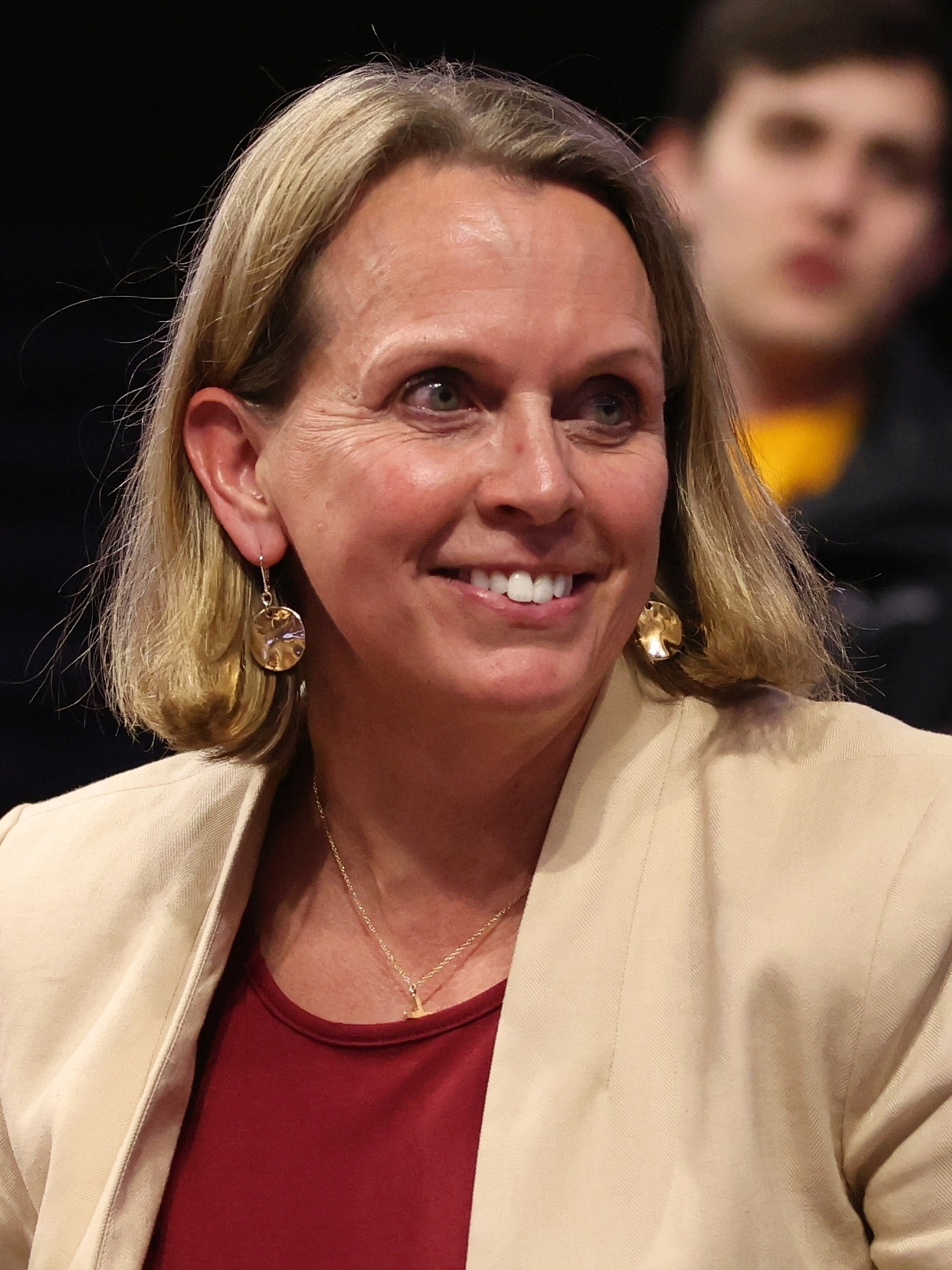
- Plitzuweit in 2023

Current position
- Title: Head coach
- Team: Minnesota
- Conference: Big Ten
- Record: 69–36 (.657)

Biographical details
- Born: October 31, 1972 (age 53); West Bend, Wisconsin, U.S.

Playing career
- 1990–1995: Michigan Tech

Coaching career (HC unless noted)
- 1995–1998: Michigan Tech (assistant)
- 1998–2002: Green Bay (assistant)
- 2002–2007: Grand Valley State
- 2007–2012: Michigan (assistant)
- 2012–2016: Northern Kentucky
- 2016–2022: South Dakota
- 2022–2023: West Virginia
- 2023–present: Minnesota

Head coaching record
- Overall: 434–176 (.711)
- Tournaments: 4–5 (NCAA Division I); 5–0 (WBIT); 8–3 (WNIT); 1–4 (WBI)

Accomplishments and honors

Championships
- NCAA Division II Tournament (2006); 3× Summit League regular season (2017–18, 2019–20, 2021–2022); 3× Summit League conference tournament championship (2020, 2021, 2022); WBIT (2025)

Awards
- As player: 2× GLIAC Player of the Year; 2× WBCA All-Academic (1994, 1995); Michigan NCAA Woman of the Year Award (1995); GLIAC Freshman of the Year (1991); As coach: Kay Yow Award (2022); 3× Summit League Coach of the Year (2018, 2019, 2020)

Dawn Plitzuweit (PLITTS-zoo-white; born October 31, 1972) is an American basketball coach, currently the head women's basketball coach at the University of Minnesota.

== Playing career ==
Plitzuweit attended Michigan Tech between 1990–1995, but did not play basketball during the 1991–92 season. In her freshman year she started all 29 games. Her sophomore year, 1992–93, played in all 33 games leading Michigan Tech to a record of 30–3 scoring 12.4 points a game, 2nd on the team. Her Junior year she, once again, played in all 28 games. Her senior year she played in 29 of the 30 games that year and would finish her career with a playing record of 99–22.

=== Michigan Tech statistics ===
Legend
GP	Games played	GS	Games started	MPG	Minutes per game
FG%	Field goal percentage	3P%	3-point field goal percentage	FT%	Free throw percentage
RPG	Rebounds per game	APG	Assists per game	SPG	Steals per game
BPG	Blocks per game	PPG	Points per game	**Bold**	Career high

Year	Team	GP	Points	FG%	3P%	FT%	RPG	APG	SPG	BPG	PPG
1990–91	Michigan Tech	29	268	.519	.000	.727	7.1	4.0	2.9	0.0	9.2
1992–93	Michigan Tech	33	408	.529	.500	.683	7.0	3.2	2.6	0.02	12.4
1993–94	Michigan Tech	28	340	.474	.130	.674	8.8	4.0	3.3	0.1	12.1
1994–95	Michigan Tech	30	382	.523	.371	.678	6.1	3.5	2.2	0.1	12.7
Career		**120**	**1,398**	**.511**	.---	**.690**	**6.0**	**3.7**	**2.8**	**0.1**	**11.6**

== Coaching career ==
=== Early coaching career ===
Plitzuweit started her career at her Alma mater, Michigan Tech, under her collegiate coach Kevin Borseth, and would continue to coach with him at Green Bay and then Michigan.

=== Grand Valley State ===
Over her five year career at Grand Valley State, Plitzuweit reached the NCAA Division II Tournament four of the five years. In 2006, Grand Valley State, with a record of 33–3, won the 2006 NCAA Division II Tournament over American International College 58–52.

=== Northern Kentucky ===
Left Michigan at the end of the 2012 season and accepted the head coaching job at Northern Kentucky. Northern Kentucky would go on to reach the WBI in all four years making it to the second round only once.

=== South Dakota ===
On April 22, 2016, Plitzuweit became the South Dakota head coach. During her tenure, she led the team to an 158–36 overall record, tallying an 83–10 mark in conference play. Coach Plitzuweit led the Coyotes to three Summit League regular season titles, three consecutive Summit League Tournament Championships, and four straight NCAA tournament appearances including a trip to the Sweet 16 in 2022. Plitzuweit was selected as Summit League coach of the year 3 times in her tenure with the Coyotes. At the conclusion of her final season with the Coyotes, Plitzuweit was named the Kay Yow National Coach of the Year.

=== West Virginia ===
On March 31, 2022, Plitzuweit was hired as the head women's basketball coach at West Virginia University.

=== Minnesota ===
On March 18, 2023, Plitzuweit was hired as the head women's basketball coach at the University of Minnesota, on a six-year contract.

== Personal life ==
Dawn is married and has a son and daughter.

== Head coaching record ==
Statistics overview
Season	Team	Overall	Conference	Standing	Postseason
Grand Valley State (Great Lakes Intercollegiate Athletic Conference) (2002–2007)
2002–03	Grand Valley State	24–7	13–5	2nd	NCAA Div. II First Round
2003–04	Grand Valley State	11–15	8–10	T-5th	
2004–05	Grand Valley State	28–6	16–2	T-1st	NCAA Div. II Quarterfinals
2005–06	Grand Valley State	33–3	15–1	1st	NCAA Div. II Champion
2006–07	Grand Valley State	21–8	14–4	1st	NCAA Div. II First Round
Grand Valley State:		117–39 (.750)	66–22 (.750)		
Northern Kentucky Norse (Atlantic Sun Conference/Horizon League) (2012–2016)
2012–13	Northern Kentucky	15–13	12–6	4th	WBI First Round
2013–14	Northern Kentucky	18–13	13–5	3rd	WBI Second Round
2014–15	Northern Kentucky	19–14	8–6	3rd	WBI First Round
2015–16	Northern Kentucky	19–14	9–9	T-5th	WBI First Round
Northern Kentucky:		71–54 (.568)	42–26 (.618)		
South Dakota Coyotes (Summit League) (2016–2022)
2016–17	South Dakota	23–9	11–5	4th	WNIT Second Round
2017–18	South Dakota	29–7	14–0	1st	WNIT Quarterfinals
2018–19	South Dakota	28–6	14–2	2nd	NCAA First Round
2019–20	South Dakota	30–2	15–0	1st	Postseason not held
2020–21	South Dakota	19–5	12–2	2nd	NCAA First Round
2021–22	South Dakota	29–6	17–1	T-1st	NCAA Sweet Sixteen
South Dakota:		158–35 (.819)	83–10 (.892)		
West Virginia Mountaineers (Big 12 Conference) (2022–2023)
2022–23	West Virginia	19–12	10–8	T-4th	NCAA First Round
West Virginia:		19–12 (.613)	10–8 (.556)		
Minnesota Golden Gophers (Big Ten Conference) (2023–present)
2023–24	Minnesota	20–16	5–13	T–11th	WNIT Runner–up
2024–25	Minnesota	25–11	8–10	13th	WBIT Champions
2025–26	Minnesota	24–9	13–5	T–4th	NCAA Sweet Sixteen
Minnesota:		69–36 (.657)	26–28 (.481)		
Total:		434–176 (.711)			
National champion Postseason invitational champion Conference regular season champion Conference regular season and conference tournament champion Division regular season champion Division regular season and conference tournament champion Conference tournament champion
