= 2024–25 Minnesota Golden Gophers women's basketball team =

American college basketball season

2024–25 Minnesota Golden Gophers women's basketball

WBIT Champions
- Conference: Big Ten Conference
- Record: 25–11 (8–10 Big Ten)
- Head coach: Dawn Plitzuweit (2nd season)
- Associate head coach: Jason Jeschke
- Assistant coaches: Aaron Horn; Aerial Braker; Tyler VanWinkle
- Home arena: Williams Arena

2024–25 Big Ten women's basketball standings
	Conf.				Overall
Team	W		L	PCT	W		L	PCT
No. 5 USC	17	–	1	.944	31	–	4	.886
No. 3 UCLA †	16	–	2	.889	34	–	3	.919
No. 19 Ohio State	13	–	5	.722	26	–	7	.788
No. 12 Maryland	13	–	5	.722	25	–	8	.758
No. 25 Michigan	11	–	7	.611	23	–	11	.676
Michigan State	11	–	7	.611	22	–	10	.688
Illinois	11	–	7	.611	22	–	10	.688
Oregon	10	–	8	.556	20	–	12	.625
Indiana	10	–	8	.556	20	–	13	.606
Nebraska	10	–	8	.556	21	–	12	.636
Iowa	10	–	8	.556	23	–	11	.676
Washington	9	–	9	.500	19	–	14	.576
Minnesota	8	–	10	.444	25	–	11	.694
Wisconsin	4	–	14	.222	13	–	17	.433
Rutgers	3	–	15	.167	13	–	20	.394
Purdue	3	–	15	.167	10	–	19	.345
Northwestern	2	–	16	.111	9	–	18	.333
Penn State	1	–	17	.056	10	–	19	.345
† 2025 Big Ten tournament winner As of April 7, 2025; Rankings from AP poll

The 2024–25 Minnesota Golden Gophers women's basketball team represented the University of Minnesota during the 2024–25 NCAA Division I women's basketball season. The Golden Gophers, were led by second-year head coach Dawn Plitzuweit, and played their home games at Williams Arena as members of the Big Ten Conference.

The Minnesota Golden Gophers ended the season winning the 2025 Women's Basketball Invitation Tournament (WBIT) over the Belmont Bruins. Minnesota was the sole Big Ten team invited to the 2025 WBIT.

== Previous season ==
The Golden Gophers finished the 2023–24 season 20–16, 5–13 in Big Ten play to finish in a tie for eleventh place. As the No. 11 seed in the Big Ten tournament, they defeated Rutgers in the first round before losing in the second round to Michigan. They were invited to the WNIT to advanced to the championship game where they lost to Saint Louis.

== Offseason ==
=== Departures ===
Name	Number	Pos.	Height	Year	Hometown	Reason for departure
Ayianna Johnson	1	F	6'3"	Freshman	Jefferson, WI	Transferred to Colorado
Aminata Zie	11	F/C	6'1"	Senior	Paris, France	Graduated
Ajok Madol	12	G/F	6'2"	Freshman	Regina, SK	Transferred to Dayton
Janay Sanders	30	G	5'11"	GS Senior	Charlotte, NC	Graduated
McKynnlie Dalan	34	F	6'1"	Freshman	Montesano, WA	Transferred to Gonzaga

=== Incoming transfers ===
Name	Number	Pos.	Height	Year	Hometown	Previous School
Alexsia Rose	0	G	5'7"	GS Senior	Bloomfield, CT	UMass
Taylor Woodson	20	F	6'0"	Sophomore	Minnetonka, MN	Michigan
Annika Stewart	21	C	6'3"	GS Senior	Plymouth, MN	Nebraska
Jordan Brooks	34	C	6'3"	Senior	Apple Valley, CA	Cal State Bakersfield

=== 2024 Recruiting class ===
College recruiting information
Name	Hometown	School	Height	Weight	Commit date
McKenna Johnson; G	Wilmot, WI	Wilmot High School	5 ft 9 in (1.75 m)	N/A	
McKenna Johnson; G	Recruit ratings: ESPN: (93)				
Overall recruit ranking:
Note: In many cases, Scout, Rivals, 247Sports, On3, and ESPN may conflict in their listings of height and weight.; In these cases, the average was taken. ESPN grades are on a 100-point scale.; Sources: "2024 Player Commits". ESPN. Archived from the original on November 5, 2024.

==== Recruiting class of 2025 ====
College recruiting information (2025)
Name	Hometown	School	Height	Weight	Commit date
Makena Christian; G	Hartford, WI	Hartford High School	5 ft 11 in (1.80 m)	N/A	
Makena Christian; G	Recruit ratings: ESPN: (94)				
Overall recruit ranking:
Note: In many cases, Scout, Rivals, 247Sports, On3, and ESPN may conflict in their listings of height and weight.; In these cases, the average was taken. ESPN grades are on a 100-point scale.; Sources: "2025 Player Commits". ESPN. Archived from the original on November 5, 2024.

== Roster ==
2024–25 Minnesota Golden Gophers women's basketball team
Players
Coaches

Pos.	#	Name	Height	Year	Previous school	Hometown
G	0	Alexsia Rose	5 ft 7 in (1.7 m)	GS	UMass	Bloomfield, CT
G	3	Amaya Battle	5 ft 11 in (1.8 m)	Jr	Hopkins	Hopkins, MN
G	5	Maggie Czinano	6 ft 0 in (1.83 m)	Sr	Watertown-Mayer	Watertown, MN
G	7	McKenna Johnson	5 ft 9 in (1.75 m)	Fr	Wilmot Union	Wilmot, WI
G	10	Mara Braun	6 ft 0 in (1.83 m)	Jr	Wayzata	Wayzata, MN
G	14	Tori McKinney	6 ft 1 in (1.85 m)	Fr	Minnetonka	Minnetonka, MN
G	15	Brynn Senden	5 ft 6 in (1.68 m)	So	Wayzata	Wayzata, MN
F	20	Taylor Woodson	6 ft 0 in (1.83 m)	So	Michigan	Minnetonka, MN
F/C	21	Annika Stewart	6 ft 3 in (1.91 m)	GS	Nebraska	Plymouth, MN
G	22	Kennedy Klick	5 ft 11 in (1.8 m)	RS Fr	Maple Grove	Brooklyn Park, MN
F	24	Mallory Heyer	6 ft 1 in (1.85 m)	Jr	Chaska	Chaska, MN
G/F	25	Grace Grocholski	5 ft 10 in (1.78 m)	So	Kettle Moraine	North Prairie, WI
C	34	Jordan Brooks	6 ft 3 in (1.91 m)	Sr	Cal State Bakersfield	Apple Valley, CA
F	41	Niamya Holloway	6 ft 0 in (1.83 m)	RS So	Eden Prairie	Eden Prairie, MN
C	52	Sophie Hart	6 ft 5 in (1.96 m)	Sr	NC State	Farmington, MN

Head coach

- Dawn Plitzuweit (Michigan Tech)

Assistant coach(es)

- Jason Jeschke (Southwestern (KS))
- Aaron Horn (Toledo)
- Ariel Braker (Notre Dame)
- Tyler VanWinkle (Illinois State)

Legend

- (C) Team captain
- (S) Suspended
- (I) Ineligible
- (W) Walk-on
- Injured
- Current redshirt

Roster

== Schedule and results ==
Date time, TV	Rank^{#}	Opponent^{#}	Result	Record	High points	High rebounds	High assists	Site (attendance) city, state
Regular season
November 4, 2024*; 7:00 p.m., B1G+		Central Connecticut	W 89–48	1–0	18 – Stewart	7 – Battle	5 – Tied	Williams Arena (2,647); Minneapolis, MN
November 8, 2024*; 7:00 p.m., B1G+		Vermont	W 74–52	2–0	21 – Tied	7 – Heyer	4 – Battle	Williams Arena (3,192); Minneapolis, MN
November 12, 2024*; 7:00 p.m., B1G+		UMass Lowell	W 82–37	3–0	13 – Johnson	10 – Heyer	3 – Braun	Williams Arena (2,616); Minneapolis, MN
November 16, 2024*; 2:00 p.m.		vs. Oregon State; Briann January Classic	W 73–38	4–0	13 – Stewart	9 – Grocholski	5 – Battle	Desert Financial Arena; Tempe, AZ
November 17, 2024*; 1:00 p.m.		vs. SMU; Briann January Classic	W 65–56	5–0	18 – Tied	13 – Grocholski	5 – Braun	Desert Financial Arena; Tempe, AZ
November 20, 2024*; 7:00 p.m., B1G+		Eastern Illinois	W 81–52	6–0	16 – Grocholski	5 – Heyer	6 – Rose	Williams Arena (2,946); Minneapolis, MN
November 24, 2024*; 2:00 p.m., B1G+		Montana	W 84–45	7–0	16 – Hart	9 – Heyer	8 – Battle	Williams Arena (3,961); Minneapolis, MN
November 29, 2024*; 1:15 p.m., YouTube		vs. Houston; Big Easy Classic Bayou Tournament	W 61–44	8–0	18 – Grocholski	11 – Heyer	3 – Tied	Alario Center (214); Westwego, LA
November 30, 2024*; 11:00 a.m., YouTube		vs. Louisiana; Big Easy Classic Bayou Tournament	W 68–48	9–0	20 – Heyer	9 – McKinney	7 – Battle	Alario Center (132); Westwego, LA
December 3, 2024*; 7:00 p.m., B1G+		North Florida	W 90–44	10–0	15 – Tied	8 – Johnson	7 – Rose	Williams Arena (2,931); Minneapolis, MN
December 8, 2024; 1:00 p.m., BTN		at No. 25 Nebraska	L 65–84	10–1 (0–1)	12 – Heyer	8 – Heyer	3 – Tied	Pinnacle Bank Arena (6,009); Lincoln, NE
December 11, 2024*; 7:00 p.m., B1G+		Jackson State	W 81–43	11–1	14 – McKinney	6 – Johnson	5 – Battle	Williams Arena (2,812); Minneapolis, MN
December 20, 2024*; 2:00 p.m., B1G+		Prairie View A&M	W 96–57	12–1	20 – Stewart	9 – Heyer	6 – Battle	Williams Arena (2,570); Minneapolis, MN
December 28, 2024; 3:00 p.m., BTN		Penn State	W 90–54	13–1 (1–1)	25 – McKinney	6 – Battle	7 – Battle	Williams Arena (5,312); Minneapolis, MN
December 31, 2024; 2:00 p.m., B1G+		at Wisconsin	W 59–50	14–1 (2–1)	13 – Battle	8 – Tied	6 – McKinney	Kohl Center (4,480); Madison, WI
January 5, 2025; 2:00 p.m., B1G+		Illinois	W 68–61	15–1 (3–1)	19 – Grocholski	10 – Heyer	5 – McKinney	Williams Arena (4,788); Minneapolis, MN
January 8, 2025; 7:00 p.m., B1G+		Rutgers	W 76–50	16–1 (4–1)	21 – Battle	11 – Hart	8 – Grocholski	Williams Arena (2,924); Minneapolis, MN
January 14, 2025; 6:00 p.m., BTN	No. 24т	at No. 8 Maryland	L 92–99	16–2 (4–2)	19 – Battle	9 – Hart	6 – Battle	Xfinity Center (5,049); College Park, MD
January 19, 2025; 2:00 p.m., B1G+	No. 24т	at Northwestern	W 87–82	17–2 (5–2)	27 – Grocholski	10 – Grocholski	6 – Battle	Welsh–Ryan Arena (1,854); Evanston, IL
January 22, 2025; 7:00 p.m., B1G+	No. 23	No. 24 Michigan	L 65–70	17–3 (5–3)	25 – Battle	7 – Heyer	5 – McKinney	Williams Arena (4,344); Minneapolis, MN
January 26, 2025; 7:00 p.m., B1G+	No. 23	Wisconsin	W 71–50	18–3 (6–3)	17 – Grocholski	11 – Heyer	4 – Hart	Williams Arena (7,554); Minneapolis, MN
January 30, 2025; 9:00 p.m., Peacock		at No. 4 USC	L 69–82	18–4 (6–4)	18 – Hart	8 – Hart	4 – Grocholski	Galen Center (5,243); Los Angeles, CA
February 2, 2025; 2:00 p.m., BTN		at No. 1 UCLA	L 53–79	18–5 (6–5)	21 – Battle	8 – Grocholski	3 – Grocholski	Pauley Pavilion (6,184); Los Angeles, CA
February 6, 2025; 7:00 p.m., BTN		Iowa	L 60–68	18–6 (6–6)	16 – McKinney	10 – Heyer	3 – McKinney	Williams Arena (6,721); Minneapolis, MN
February 9, 2025; 2:00 p.m., B1G+		Indiana	W 66–56	19–6 (7–6)	16 – Battle	13 – Heyer	5 – Battle	Williams Arena (4,180); Minneapolis, MN
February 13, 2025; 6:30 p.m., Peacock		at No. 9 Ohio State	L 84–87 ^{OT}	19–7 (7–7)	21 – Hart	7 – Heyer	5 – Battle	Value City Arena (6,417); Columbus, OH
February 16, 2025; 2:00 p.m., B1G+		Oregon	L 70–76	19–8 (7–8)	16 – Grocholski	14 – Heyer	6 – Battle	Williams Arena (6,487); Minneapolis, MN
February 19, 2025; 6:00 p.m., B1G+		at Purdue	W 74–61	20–8 (8–8)	27 – Grocholski	10 – Heyer	5 – Grocholski	Mackey Arena (3,814); West Lafayette, IN
February 26, 2025; 7:00 p.m., B1G+		Washington	L 62–72	20–9 (8–9)	13 – Tied	8 – Heyer	6 – Battle	Williams Arena (4,297); Minneapolis, MN
March 1, 2025; 1:00 p.m., B1G+		at No. 23 Michigan State	L 58–73	20–10 (8–10)	23 – Grocholski	7 – Tied	4 – Battle	Breslin Center (7,616); East Lasning, MI
Big Ten Women's Tournament
March 5, 2025; 2:30 p.m., Peacock	(13)	vs. (12) Washington; First Round	L 65–79	20–11	21 – Grocholski	7 – Grocholski	5 – Grocholski	Gainbridge Fieldhouse; Indianapolis, IN
Women's Basketball Invitation Tournament
March 20, 2025*; 6:00 p.m., ESPN+	(2)	at Toledo; First Round	W 65–53	21–11	18 – Battle	9 – Heyer	3 – McKinney	Savage Arena (2,006); Toledo, OH
March 23, 2025*; 2:00 p.m., ESPN+	(2)	at (3) Missouri State; Second Round	W 78–71	22–11	18 – Tied	12 – Heyer	5 – Battle	Great Southern Bank Arena (2,416); Springfield, MO
March 27, 2025*; 7:00 p.m., ESPN+	(2)	(4) Gonzaga; Quarterfinals	W 82–77 ^{OT}	23–11	35 – Battle	6 – Tied	10 – Battle	Williams Arena (2,451); Minneapolis, MN
March 31, 2025*; 4:00 p.m., ESPNU	(2)	vs. (3) Florida; Semifinals	W 66–52	24–11	20 – Grocholski	15 – Heyer	6 – McKinney	Hinkle Fieldhouse; Indianapolis, IN
April 2, 2025*; 5:00 p.m., ESPN2	(2)	vs. (3) Belmont; Championship	W 75–63	25–11	26 – McKinney	16 – Heyer	8 – Grocholski	Hinkle Fieldhouse; Indianapolis, IN
*Non-conference game. ^{#}Rankings from AP Poll. (#) Tournament seedings in parentheses. All times are in Central Time.

== Rankings ==
Ranking movements Legend: ██ Increase in ranking ██ Decrease in ranking — = Not ranked RV = Received votes т = Tied with team above or below
	Week																				
Poll	Pre	1	2	3	4	5	6	7	8	9	10	11	12	13	14	15	16	17	18	19	Final
AP	—	—	—	—	RV	RV	—	—	—	RV	24т	23	RV	RV	—	—	—	—	—	—	
Coaches	—	—	—	—	—	—	—	—	—	RV	25	24	RV	—	—	—	—	—	—	—	
