= Trinity Christian High School (Lubbock, Texas) =

Trinity Christian School

Location
- 6701 University Avenue; Lubbock, Texas 79413; United States; 33.532883°N 101.869449°W

Information
- Type: Private Christian
- Motto: Train a child in the way he should go, and when he is old he will not turn from it. ~ Pr 22:6
- Established: 1977
- Superintendent: Stephen Cox
- NCES School ID: 02061888
- Faculty: 83.5 FTEs
- Enrollment: 589 (plus 35 in PreK, as of 2019–20)
- Student to teacher ratio: 7.1:1
- Colors: Red Navy and White
- Team name: Lions
- Website: www.tcslubbock.org

Trinity Christian High School is a private Christian high school run by Trinity Church of Lubbock, Texas. The school was founded in 1977 and graduated its first senior class in 1991. The school is accredited by the Association of Christian Schools International (ACSI) and is approved by the State of Texas.

As of the 2019–20 school year, the school had an enrollment of 589 students (plus 35 students in PreK) and 83.5 classroom teachers (on an FTE basis), for a student–teacher ratio of 7.1:1. The school's student body was 87.9% (518) White, 5.9% (35) Hispanic, 2.0% (12) Asian, 2.0% (12) two or more races, 1.0% (6) Black and 1.0% (6) American Indian / Alaska Native.

== Awards and recognition ==
Trinity Christian School was selected by the Lubbock Avalanche-Journal as its Readers Choice Best of Lubbock Awards 2006 winner as Best Private School, based on ballots submitted by 2,500 of the paper's readers.

== Athletics ==
Trinity Christian defeated Fort Worth Christian by a final score of 55-51, to win the Texas Association of Private and Parochial Schools (TAPPS) 4A state championship game played on March 1, 2003, at Texas Southern University in Houston. They also won the 1999 4A championship.

The Trinity Christian girls basketball team won the 2005 Class 4A championship over Carrollton Christian by a score of 56-44. The team also won the 2004 4A championship.

Trinity Christian has won three girls volleyball TAPPS state championships, including back-to-back titles in 2004 and 2005 (with a 3-0 over Garland Christian), when the team had records of 40-4 and 41-7 respectively. The team won their first state title in 1999, with a 31-1 season record.

The third-ranked Trinity Christian girls basketball team made it to the TAPPS 5A state championship, falling to the 2nd-ranked Liberty Christian by a final score of 62-51, in a game played on March 4, 2007, at the University of Texas at Tyler.

== Notable alumni ==
- Bobby Livingston (born 1982), baseball player, Sugar Land Skeeters.
