= Vaught =

Vaught is a surname, and may refer to:

- BC Vaught, drummer for Hed PE
- DeAnn Vaught, member of the Arkansas House of Representatives
- James B. Vaught, United States Army Lieutenant General
- Johnny Vaught, American college football player
- Loy Vaught, American basketball player
- Robert Lawson Vaught, American mathematical logician

== See also ==
- Vaughn (disambiguation)
