= 2025 Women's Basketball Invitation Tournament =

Women's college basketball tournament

2025 WBIT
- Season: 2024–25
- Teams: 32
- Finals site: Hinkle Fieldhouse, Indianapolis, Indiana
- Champions: Minnesota (1st title)
- Runner-up: Belmont (1st title game)
- Semifinalists: Villanova (2nd semifinal); Florida (1st semifinal)
- Winning coach: Dawn Plitzuweit (1st title)
- MVP: Tori McKinney (Minnesota)

The 2025 Women's Basketball Invitation Tournament (WBIT) was a single-elimination tournament of 32 NCAA Division I women's college basketball teams not selected to participate in the 2025 NCAA tournament. The tournament began on March 20 and ended on April 2. The first three rounds were played on the campuses of various schools, and the semifinal and championship games were played at Hinkle Fieldhouse in Indianapolis, Indiana.

The Minnesota Golden Gophers won the 2025 WBIT over the Belmont Bruins. Minnesota was the sole Big Ten team invited to the 2025 WBIT.

== Participants ==
Teams and pairings for the 2025 WBIT were released by the WBIT committee on Sunday, March 16, 2025. Thirty–two teams qualified for the WBIT, including both automatic qualifiers and at-large selections.

=== Automatic qualifiers ===
The regular-season champion of any NCAA Division I conference (as determined by the conference's tiebreaking protocol) not otherwise selected for the NCAA Division I women's basketball tournament will, if eligible, secure an automatic qualification invitation to the WBIT. Like the Division I tournament committee, the WBIT selection committee used a variety of resources to determine the participating teams.

Team	Conference	Overall record
Albany	America East	26–6
UTSA	American	26–4
Hawaii	Big West	22–9
North Carolina A&T	CAA	19–11
UNLV	Mountain West	25–7
Southeastern Louisiana	Southland	26–5
James Madison	Sun Belt	28–5
Gonzaga	WCC	22–10

=== At-large bids ===
The following teams were awarded at-large bids.

Team	Conference	Overall record
Arizona	Big 12	19–13
Belmont	Missouri Valley	22–12
Boston College	ACC	16–17
Colorado	Big 12	20–12
Davidson	A10	19–13
Drake	Missouri Valley	22–11
Florida	SEC	16–17
Marquette	Big East	20–10
Middle Tennessee	CUSA	26–8
Minnesota	Big Ten	20–11
Missouri State	Missouri Valley	25–8
Northern Arizona	Big Sky	26–7
Northern Iowa	Missouri Valley	17–16
Oral Roberts	Summit	24–8
Portland	WCC	29–4
Quinnipiac	MAAC	28–4
Saint Joseph's	A10	23–9
Seton Hall	Big East	22–9
Stanford	ACC	16–14
Texas Tech	Big 12	17–17
Toledo	MAC	24–8
Villanova	Big East	18–14
Virginia Tech	ACC	18–12
Wyoming	Mountain West	22–11

== Bracket ==
First round March 20; Campus sites
1	Virginia Tech	61
North Carolina A&T	45
4	Wyoming	48
Texas Tech	65
3	Florida	83
Northern Iowa	71
2	UNLV	63
Hawaii	46

Second round March 23; Campus sites
1	Virginia Tech	59
Texas Tech	69
3	Florida	86
2	UNLV	84

Quarterfinal; March 27; Gainesville, FL
Texas Tech	63
3	Florida	67

First round March 20; Campus sites
1	Colorado	73
Southeastern Louisiana	41
4	Gonzaga	67
UTSA	51
3	Missouri State	107
Oral Roberts	76
2	Minnesota	65
Toledo^	53

Second round March 23; Campus sites
1	Colorado	55
4	Gonzaga	64
3	Missouri State^	71
2	Minnesota	78

Quarterfinal; March 27; Minneapolis, MN
4	Gonzaga	77
2	Minnesota*	82

^ - Due to facilities conflicts with Minnesota, Toledo hosted the first-round game and Missouri State hosted the second-round game

First round March 20; Campus sites
1	James Madison	77
Davidson	50
4	Drake	69
Marquette	74
3	Belmont	64
Middle Tennessee	51
2	Arizona	69
Northern Arizona	71

Second round March 23; Campus sites
1	James Madison	80*
Marquette	76
3	Belmont	81
Northern Arizona	80

Quarterfinal; March 27; Harrisonburg, VA
1	James Madison	45
3	Belmont	90

First round March 20; Campus sites
1	Saint Joseph's	69
Albany	40
4	Villanova	76
Boston College	70
3	Seton Hall	57
Quinnipiac	40
2	Stanford	68
Portland	69*

Second round March 23; Campus sites
1	Saint Joseph's	60
4	Villanova	62
3	Seton Hall	55
Portland	61

Quarterfinal; March 27; Villanova, PA
4	Villanova	71
Portland	61

Semifinals; March 31; Hinkle Fieldhouse
3	Florida	52
2	Minnesota	66
3	Belmont	66
4	Villanova	57

Final; April 2 Hinkle Fieldhouse
2	Minnesota	75
3	Belmont	63

* Denotes overtime period

== See also ==
- 2025 NCAA Division I women's basketball tournament
- 2025 Women's National Invitation Tournament
