= 2019–20 South Dakota State Jackrabbits women's basketball team =

Intercollegiate basketball season

2019–20 South Dakota State Jackrabbits women's basketball
- Conference: Summit League
- Record: 23–10 (13–3 The Summit)
- Head coach: Aaron Johnston (20th full, 21st overall season)
- Assistant coaches: Mike Jewett; Carissa Thielbar; Megan Lueck
- Home arena: Frost Arena

2019–20 Summit League women's basketball standings
	Conf.				Overall
Team	W		L	PCT	W		L	PCT
No. 17 South Dakota †	16	–	0	1.000	28	–	2	.933
South Dakota State	13	–	3	.813	22	–	9	.710
Denver	9	–	7	.563	15	–	15	.500
Western Illinois	9	–	7	.563	15	–	15	.500
Oral Roberts	9	–	7	.563	15	–	15	.500
North Dakota State	7	–	9	.438	11	–	18	.379
North Dakota	6	–	10	.375	15	–	15	.500
Omaha	2	–	14	.125	7	–	23	.233
Purdue Fort Wayne	1	–	15	.063	5	–	24	.172
† 2020 Summit League tournament winner Rankings from AP poll

The 2019–20 South Dakota State Jackrabbits women's basketball team represented South Dakota State University in the 2019–20 NCAA Division I women's basketball season. The Jackrabbits, led by twentieth-year head coach Aaron Johnston, competed in the Summit League. They played their home games in Frost Arena in Brookings, South Dakota.

== Previous season ==
The 2018–19 Jackrabbits went 28–7 overall and 15–1 in conference play, finishing in first place.

The Jackrabbits won the 2019 Summit League tournament, defeating Purdue Fort Wayne in the quarterfinals, Oral Roberts in the semifinals, and South Dakota in the Summit League championship game, 83–71, earning the Jackrabbits an automatic bid to the 2019 NCAA Division I women's basketball tournament.

They received a six seed in the Portland Region, facing the number 11 seed Quinnipiac, and defeated them 76–65. In the second round, the Jackrabbits faceed the number three seed Syracuse and beat them as well, with a score of 75–64. For the second time this season, the Jackrabbits lost to Oregon, but in the Sweet Sixteen matchup.

== Roster ==
2019–20 South Dakota State Jackrabbits women's basketball team
Players
Coaches

Pos.	#	Name	Height	Year	Previous school	Hometown
G	2	Rylie Cascio Jensen	5 ft 10 in (1.78 m)	Sr	Fremont; Nebraska	Fremont, NE
G	3	Lindsey Theuninck	5 ft 7 in (1.7 m)	RS So	Mankato Loyola	Mankato, MN
G	10	Lauren Rongisch	5 ft 7 in (1.7 m)	RS Fr	Millard West HS	Omaha, NE
F	12	Kallie Theisen	6 ft 1 in (1.85 m)	Fr	Wayzata High School	Plymouth, MN
F	20	Tori Nelson	6 ft 1 in (1.85 m)	Fr	Henry Sibley High School	Mendota Heights, MN
G	21	Tylee Irwin	6 ft 0 in (1.83 m)	Jr	Wahpeton	Wahpeton, ND
F	24	Tagyn Larson	6 ft 2 in (1.88 m)	RS Sr	Roosevelt HS; Iowa	Sioux Falls, SD
F	30	Jordan Ferrand	6 ft 2 in (1.88 m)	So	White Bear Lake HS	Lino Lakes, MN
F	33	Paiton Burckhard	6 ft 0 in (1.83 m)	So	Central HS	Aberdeen, SD
F	35	Sydney Stapleton	5 ft 10 in (1.78 m)	So	Centennial HS	Blaine, MN
F	42	Regan Nesheim (redshirt)	6 ft 1 in (1.85 m)	Fr	Johnston High School	Johnston, IA
G/F	44	Myah Selland	6 ft 2 in (1.88 m)	Jr	Sanborn Central/Woonsocket HS	Letcher, SD
C	50	Megan Bultsma	6 ft 3 in (1.91 m)	Sr	Mount Vernon/Plankinton HS	Plankinton, SD
F	52	Addison Hirschman	6 ft 2 in (1.88 m)	So	Kingsley-Pierson HS	Kingsley, IA

Head coach

- Aaron Johnston (Gustavus Adolphus)

Assistant coach(es)

- Mike Jewett (Augustana (SD))
- Carissa Thielbar (UW–Superior)
- Megan Lueck (Minnesota Duluth)

Legend

- (C) Team captain
- (S) Suspended
- (I) Ineligible
- (W) Walk-on
- Injured
- Current redshirt

Roster
Last update: July 13, 2024

== Schedule ==
Date time, TV	Rank^{#}	Opponent^{#}	Result	Record	Site (attendance) city, state
Exhibition
October 30, 2019*; 6:00 p.m.		St. Cloud State	W 85-43		Frost Arena; Brookings, SD
Non-conference regular season
November 8, 2019*; 6:00 p.m., ESPN3		at Drake	L 67-74	0-1	Knapp Center (2,793); Des Moines, IA
November 12, 2019*; 7:00 p.m.		at Creighton	L 48-61	0-2	D. J. Sokol Arena (774); Omaha, NE
November 15, 2019*; 7:45 p.m.		vs. Dakota Wesleyan	W 77-49	1-2	Denny Sanford Premier Center (2,139); Sioux Falls, SD
November 21, 2019*; 7:00 p.m.		Montana State	W 60-50	2-2	Frost Arena (1,596); Brookings, SD
November 23, 2019*; 6:00 p.m.		Wyoming	W 67-40	3-2	Frost Arena (1,499); Brookings, SD
November 28, 2019*; 10:00 a.m.		vs. No. 21 South Florida; Cancún Challenge	W 61-50	4-2	Hard Rock Hotel Riviera Convention Center (235); Cancún, Mexico
November 29, 2019*; 10:00 a.m.		vs. Notre Dame; Cancún Challenge	W 65-59	5-2	Hard Rock Hotel Riviera Convention Center (259); Cancún, Mexico
November 30, 2019*; 12:30 p.m.		vs. Florida Gulf Coast; Cancún Challenge	L 70-71	5-3	Hard Rock Hotel Riviera Convention Center (157); Cancún, Mexico
December 5, 2019*; 7:00 p.m.		Coppin State	W 94-41	6-3	Frost Arena (1,312); Brookings, SD
December 8, 2019*; 2:00 p.m., PAC-12		at No. 3 Oregon	L 56-95	6-4	Matthew Knight Arena (9,560); Eugene, OR
December 11, 2019*; 7:00 p.m.		at Chattanooga	W 71-56	7-4	Frost Arena (1,326); Brookings, SD
December 14, 2019*; 2:00 p.m.		Central Michigan	L 74-79	7-5	Frost Arena (1,369); Brookings, SD
December 17, 2019*; 7:00 p.m.		Marquette	L 58-65	7-6	Frost Arena (1,391); Brookings, SD
December 21, 2019*; 4:00 p.m., ESPN+		at Green Bay	W 60-55	8-6	Kress Events Center (1,700); Green Bay, WI
Summit League regular season
December 29, 2019; 2:00 p.m., ESPN+		at Omaha	W 68-51	9-6 (1-0)	Baxter Arena (611); Omaha, NE
January 2, 2020; 6:00 p.m.		Oral Roberts #BeatType1Diabetes Game	W 58-44	10-6 (2-0)	Frost Arena (1,538); Brookings, SD
January 4, 2020; 2:00 p.m., ESPN3		Western Illinois; Lamb Bonanza	W 75-45	11-6 (3-0)	Frost Arena (2,020); Brookings, SD
January 9, 2020; 8:00 p.m.		at Denver	W 86-79	12-6 (4-0)	Hamilton Gymnasium (341); Denver, CO
January 12, 2020; 1:00 p.m.		at Purdue Fort Wayne	W 100-69	13-6 (5-0)	Memorial Coliseum (718); Fort Wayne, IN
January 16, 2020; 7:00 p.m., ESPN+		North Dakota	W 99-64	14-6 (6-0)	Frost Arena (1,603); Brookings, SD
January 18, 2020; 1:00 p.m., ESPN3		at No. 25 South Dakota	L 48-83	14-7 (6-1)	Sanford Coyote Sports Center (5,153); Vermillion, SD
January 24, 2020; 7:00 p.m., ESPN+		North Dakota State	W 60-52	15-7 (7-1)	Frost Arena (1,959); Brookings, SD
January 30, 2020; 5:15 p.m., ESPN3		at Western Illinois	W 89-48	16-7 (8-1)	Western Hall (581); Macomb, IL
February 1, 2020; 2:00 p.m.		at Oral Roberts	W 76-61	17-7 (9-1)	Mabee Center (1,303); Tulsa, OK
February 8, 2020; 2:00 p.m.		Omaha; Pork Classic	W 69-59	18-7 (10-1)	Frost Arena (2,929); Brookins, SD
February 13, 2020; 7:00 p.m.		Denver; Academic Night	L 62-72	18-8 (10-2)	Frost Arena (1,628); Brookins, SD
February 15, 2020; 1:00 p.m., MidcoSN/ESPN3		Purdue Fort Wayne; Family of the Year	W 89-43	19-8 (11-2)	Frost Arena (1,627); Brookins, SD
February 20, 2020; 7:00 p.m., ESPN3		at North Dakota	W 74-61	20-8 (12-2)	Betty Engelstad Sioux Center (1,394); Grand Forks, ND
February 22, 2020; 2:00 p.m., MidcoSN/ESPN3		No. 20 South Dakota	L 67-77	20-9 (12-3)	Frost Arena (3,672); Brookins, SD
February 27, 2020; 5:00 p.m., ESPN+		at North Dakota State	W 85-58	21-9 (13-3)	Scheels Center (1,356); Fargo, ND
Summit League women's tournament
March 7, 2020; 2:30 p.m., MidcoSN/ESPN+	(2)	vs. (7) North Dakota; Quarterfinals	W 72-43	22-9	Denny Sanford Premier Center; Sioux Falls, SD
March 9, 2020; 2:30 p.m., MidcoSN/ESPN+	(2)	vs. (6) North Dakota State; Semifinals	W 76-56	23–9	Denny Sanford Premier Center; Sioux Falls, SD
March 10, 2020; 1:00 p.m., MidcoSN/ESPNU	(2)	vs. (1) No. 17 South Dakota; Championship	L 58-63	23-10	Denny Sanford Premier Center (7,833); Sioux Falls, SD
*Non-conference game. ^{#}Rankings from AP poll. (#) Tournament seedings in parentheses. All times are in Central.

== Rankings ==
Regular-season polls
Poll	Pre- season	Week 2	Week 3	Week 4	Week 5	Week 6	Week 7	Week 8	Week 9	Week 10	Week 11	Week 12	Week 13	Week 14	Week 15	Week 16	Week 17	Week 18	Week 19	Final
AP	RV	RV																		N/A
Coaches	RV	*																		

Legend
	Increase in ranking
	Decrease in ranking
	Not ranked previous week
(RV)	Received votes
(NR)	Not ranked
