= 2019–20 South Dakota Coyotes women's basketball team =

Intercollegiate basketball season

2019–20 South Dakota Coyotes women's basketball

Summit League regular season champions Summit League tournament champions
- Conference: Summit League

Ranking
- Coaches: No. 12
- AP: No. 17
- Record: 30–2 (16–0 The Summit)
- Head coach: Dawn Plitzuweit (4th season)
- Assistant coaches: Jason Jeschke; Aaron Horn; Jenna Schlafke
- Home arena: Sanford Coyote Sports Center

2019–20 Summit League women's basketball standings
	Conf.				Overall
Team	W		L	PCT	W		L	PCT
No. 17 South Dakota †	16	–	0	1.000	28	–	2	.933
South Dakota State	13	–	3	.813	22	–	9	.710
Denver	9	–	7	.563	15	–	15	.500
Western Illinois	9	–	7	.563	15	–	15	.500
Oral Roberts	9	–	7	.563	15	–	15	.500
North Dakota State	7	–	9	.438	11	–	18	.379
North Dakota	6	–	10	.375	15	–	15	.500
Omaha	2	–	14	.125	7	–	23	.233
Purdue Fort Wayne	1	–	15	.063	5	–	24	.172
† 2020 Summit League tournament winner Rankings from AP poll

The 2019–20 South Dakota Coyotes women's basketball team represented the University of South Dakota in the 2019–20 NCAA Division I women's basketball season. The Coyotes, led by fourth-year head coach Dawn Plitzuweit, competed in the Summit League. They played their home games in Sanford Coyote Sports Center in Vermillion, South Dakota. The Coyotes finished the season ranked 17th in the AP Poll and eleventh in the coaches poll. It was the highest finish by any Summit League team, and they were in the top 25 ranking for 16 straight weeks, also setting a record.

== Previous season ==
The Coyotes went 28–6 overall and 14–2 in Summit League play. At one point during the season, South Dakota were ranked for the first time in school history. In the Summit League Tournament, the Coyotes reached the championship game for the sixth time in the past seven years, and again faced South Dakota State for the fifth time in those six years. South Dakota reached the NCAA tournament, after the Summit League tournament loss to South Dakota State, as an at-large bid to the Portland Regional as a number 8 seed. They faced off against the Clemson, but lost 79–66.

== Offseason ==
=== Departures ===
Name	Number	Pos.	Height	Year	Hometown	Reason for departure
Allison Arens	10	G	5'10"	Senior	Crofton, NE	Graduated
Courtney Schoenbeck	4	G	5'8"	Freshman	Walworth, WI	Transferred to Wisconsin-Parkside

== Roster ==
2018–19 South Dakota Coyotes women's basketball team
Players
Coaches

Pos.	#	Name	Height	Year	Previous school	Hometown
G	1	Claudia Kunzer	5 ft 7 in (1.7 m)	Jr	Montini Catholic HS	Bartlett, IL
G	2	Liv Korngable	5 ft 8 in (1.73 m)	Jr	Mayo HS	Rochester, MN
G	3	Macy Guebert	5 ft 9 in (1.75 m)	Fr	Eastview HS	Apple Valley, MN
G	11	Monica Arens	5 ft 10 in (1.78 m)	Jr	Crofton HS	Crofton, NE
F	14	Regan Sankey	6 ft 0 in (1.83 m)	So	Lincoln East HS	Lincoln, NE
F	15	Taylor Fredrick	6 ft 1 in (1.85 m)	Sr	Harlan Community HS	Earling, IA
F	20	Megan Bonar	6 ft 2 in (1.88 m)	Sr	De Soto	Gardner, KS
G	22	Chloe Lamb	5 ft 10 in (1.78 m)	Jr	Sully Buttes HS	Onida, SD
G	23	Madison McKeever	5 ft 6 in (1.68 m)	Sr	Win-E-Mac Secondary School	Erskine, MN
G	24	Ciara Duffy	6 ft 0 in (1.83 m)	Sr	St. Thomas More HS	Rapid City, SD
F	30	Jeniah Ugofsky	5 ft 11 in (1.8 m)	Fr	Harrisburg HS	Harrisburg, SD
C	34	Hannah Sjerven	6 ft 3 in (1.91 m)	RS Jr	Rogers HS; New Mexico	Rogers, MN
F	35	Allison Peplowski	6 ft 1 in (1.85 m)	So	Williamston HS	Williamston, MI
F	41	Alexi Hempe	5 ft 11 in (1.8 m)	Fr	TPLS Christian Academy	Fredericksburg, VA

Head coach

- Dawn Plitzuweit (Michigan Tech)

Assistant coach(es)

- Jason Jeschke (Southwestern (KS))
- Aaron Horn (Toledo)
- Jenna Schlafke (Concordia-Moorhead)

Legend

- (C) Team captain
- (S) Suspended
- (I) Ineligible
- (W) Walk-on
- Injured
- Current redshirt

Roster

== Schedule ==
Date time, TV	Rank^{#}	Opponent^{#}	Result	Record	Site (attendance) city, state
Non-conference regular season
November 5, 2019*; 12:05 pm, NESN/FLOHOOPS		vs. Northeastern	W 80–76	1–0	Cabot Center (818); Boston, MA
November 9, 2019*; 1:00 pm, ESPN3		at Green Bay	W 66–60	2–0	Kress Events Center (1,997); Green Bay, WI
November 13, 2019*; 7:00 pm, MIDCOSN/ESPN+		Drake	W 102–94 ^{OT}	3–0	Sanford Coyote Sports Center (2,330); Vermillion, SD
November 16, 2019*; 12:00 pm		at Utah	W 84–81 ^{OT}	4–0	Jon M. Huntsman Center (2,139); Salt Lake City, UT
November 21, 2019*; 7:00 pm		Missouri	W 72–56	5–0	Sanford Coyote Sports Center (2,407); Vermillion, SD
November 25, 2019*; 7:00 pm, MIDCOSN2/ESPN+		Missouri State	L 66–74	5–1	Sanford Coyote Sports Center (2,115); Vermillion, SD
November 29, 2019*; 5:30 pm		vs. Ohio State; South Point Thanksgiving Shootout	W 68–53	6–1	South Point Arena (300); Las Vegas, NV
November 30, 2019*; 3:15 pm		vs. Northern Illinois; South Point Thanksgiving Shootout	W 91–48	7–1	South Point Arena (350); Las Vegas, NV
December 4, 2019*; 7:00 pm, MIDCOSN/ESPN+		Creighton	W 72–65	8–1	Sanford Coyote Sports Center (2,146); Vermillion, SD
December 7, 2019*; 1:00 pm		Coppin State	W 82–44	9–1	Sanford Coyote Sports Center (1,542); Vermillion, SD
December 11, 2019*; 7:00 pm		Mount Marty College	W 110–39	10–1	Sanford Coyote Sports Center (1,471); Vermillion, SD
December 15, 2019*; 1:00 pm, MIDCOSN/ESPN+		Montana	W 96–64	11–1	Sanford Coyote Sports Center (1,770); Vermillion, SD
December 22, 2019*; 11:00 am, SECN+	No. 25	at No. 5 South Carolina	L 60–73	11–2	Colonial Life Arena (10,505); Columbia, SC
Summit League regular season
December 29, 2019; 2:00 pm		at Western Illinois	W 96–65	12–2 (1–0)	Western Hall (576); Macomb, IL
January 1, 2020; 11:30 am		at Purdue Fort Wayne	W 62–41	13–2 (2–0)	Hilliard Gates Sports Center (392); Fort Wayne, IN
January 5, 2020; 1:00 pm		Denver	W 104–61	14–2 (3–0)	Sanford Coyote Sports Center (1,921); Vermillion, SD
January 11, 2020; 1:00 pm, MIDCOSN/ESPN3	No. 22	Omaha	W 77–44	15–2 (4–0)	Sanford Coyote Sports Center (2,576); Vermillion, SD
January 16, 2020; 7:00 pm, MIDCOSN2/ESPN3	No. 25	at North Dakota State	W 80–36	16–2 (5–0)	Scheels Center (465); Fargo, ND
January 19, 2020; 1:00 pm, MIDCOSN/ESPN3	No. 25	South Dakota State	W 83–48	17–2 (6–0)	Sanford Coyote Sports Center (5,153); Vermillion, SD
January 24, 2019; 7:00 pm	No. 24	Purdue Fort Wayne	W 79–25	18–2 (7–0)	Sanford Coyote Sports Center (1,786); Vermillion, SD
January 26, 2019; 1:00 pm, MIDCOSN2/ESPN+	No. 24	Oral Roberts	W 79–56	19–2 (8–0)	Sanford Coyote Sports Center (1,857); Vermillion, SD
January 29, 2020; 7:00 pm, MIDCOSN/ESPN3	No. 21	at Omaha	W 71–39	20–2 (9–0)	Baxter Arena (631); Omaha, NE
February 2, 2020; 2:00 pm	No. 21	at Denver	W 92–60	21–2 (10–0)	Hamilton Gymnasium (316); Denver, CO
February 9, 2020; 2:00 pm, MIDCOSN/ESPN+	No. 22	at North Dakota	W 93–46	22–2 (11–0)	Betty Engelstad Sioux Center (1,553); Grand Forks, ND
February 13, 2020; 7:00 pm, MIDCOSN/ESPN+	No. 21	Western Illinois	W 88–51	23–2 (12–0)	Sanford Coyote Sports Center (1,888); Vermillion, SD
February 15, 2020; 2:00 pm	No. 21	at Oral Roberts	W 77–73	24–2 (13–0)	Mabee Center (1,256); Tulsa, OK
February 20, 2020; 7:00 pm, MIDCOSN2/ESPN+	No. 20	North Dakota State; Coach P's Pack Night/Pink Game	W 96–57	25–2 (14–0)	Sanford Coyote Sports Center (2,260); Vermillion, SD
February 22, 2020; 2:00 pm, MIDCOSN2/ESPN3	No. 20	at South Dakota State	W 77–67	26–2 (15–0)	Frost Arena (3,672); Brookings, SD
February 29, 2020; 1:00 pm	No. 20	North Dakota; Senior Day	W 76–47	27–2 (16–0)	Sanford Coyote Sports Center (3,863); Vermillion, SD
Summit League Women's Tournament
March 7, 2020; 12:00 pm, MidcosSN/ESPN+	(1) No. 17	vs. (8) Omaha; Quarterfinals	W 99–40	28–2	Denny Sanford Premier Center; Sioux Falls, SD
March 9, 2020; 12:00 pm, MidcosSN/ESPN+	(1) No. 17	vs. (4) Oral Roberts; Semifinals	W 65–43	29–2	Denny Sanford Premier Center; Sioux Falls, SD
March 10, 2020; 1:00 pm, ESPNU	(1) No. 17	vs. (2) South Dakota State; Championship	W 63–48	30–2	Denny Sanford Premier Center (7,833); Sioux Falls, SD
*Non-conference game. ^{#}Rankings from AP Poll. (#) Tournament seedings in parentheses. All times are in Central Time. "2019–20 Schedule & Results". University of South Dakota Athletics.

== Rankings ==
+ Regular season polls	Poll	Pre- season	Week 2	Week 3	Week 4	Week 5	Week 6	Week 7	Week 8	Week 9	Week 10	Week 11	Week 12	Week 13	Week 14	Week 15	Week 16	Week 17	Week 18	Week 19	Final
AP	RV	RV	RV	RV	RV	RV	25	RV	RV	22	25	24	21	22	21	20	20	17	17	17	
Coaches	RV	RV	RV	RV	24	21	21	22	22	22	21	18	18	17	16	15	12	12	11	11	

Legend
	Increase in ranking
	Decrease in ranking
	Not ranked previous week
(RV)	Received votes
(NR)	Not ranked
