= Summit League women's basketball tournament =

- Summit League Conference tournament logo (2008-present)
- Sport: College basketball
- Conference: Summit League
- Number of teams: 8
- Format: Single-elimination tournament
- Current stadium: Denny Sanford Premier Center
- Current location: Sioux Falls, South Dakota
- Played: 1993–present
- Last contest: 2026
- Current champion: South Dakota State Jackrabbits (13)
- Most championships: South Dakota State Jackrabbits (13)
- TV partner(s): Midco Sports, CBS Sports Network
- Official website: TheSummitLeague.org Women's Basketball

The Summit League women's basketball tournament has existed since 1993. The winner of the tournament receives the Summit League's automatic bid into the NCAA Women's Division I Basketball Championship.

The Summit League was known as the Association of Mid-Continent Universities (AMCU) from 1982–1989 and Mid-Continent Conference from 1989–2007.

== Tournament champions ==
Year	(Seed) Champion	Score	Runner-up	Tournament MVP
1992–93	(1) Northern Illinois	75–58	(2) Wisconsin–Green Bay (Note: Now athletically branded as Green Bay.)	Dawn Schirmacher, Wisconsin–Green Bay
1993–94	(2) Wisconsin–Green Bay	73–70	(1) Northern Illinois	E. C. Hill, Northern Illinois
1994–95	(1) Western Illinois	73–60	(2) Youngstown State	Oberon Pitterson, Western Illinois
1995–96	(1) Youngstown State	53–43	(2) Buffalo	Shannon Beach, Youngstown State
1996–97	(1) Troy State (Note: Now known as Troy.)	89–75	(2) Youngstown State	Samantha Tomlinson, Troy State
1997–98	(1) Youngstown State	78–69	(2) Valparaiso	Sarrah Stricklett, Valparaiso
1998–99	(4) Oral Roberts	57–52	(2) Youngstown State	Krista Ragan, Oral Roberts
1999–00	(2) Youngstown State	73–57	(4) Valparaiso	Brianne Kenneally, Youngstown State
2000–01	(2) Oral Roberts	61–46	(1) Oakland	Krista Ragan, Oral Roberts
2001–02	(2) Oakland	52–40	(1) Valparaiso	Sarah Judd, Oakland
2002–03	(4) Valparaiso	48–46	(6) Oakland	Katie Boone, Valparaiso
2003–04	(2) Valparaiso	64–63	(4) Oral Roberts	Leah Cannon, Oral Roberts
2004–05	(4) Oral Roberts	48–42	(7) UMKC (Note: Now athletically branded as Kansas City.)	Elisha Turek, Oral Roberts
2005–06	(6) Oakland	65–56	(1) Western Illinois	Anne Hafeli, Oakland
2006–07	(3) Oral Roberts	72–55	(1) Oakland	Elisha Turek, Oral Roberts
2007–08	(4) Oral Roberts	66–53	(3) IUPUI	Elisha Turek, Oral Roberts
2008–09	(1) South Dakota State	79–69	(2) Oakland	Jennifer Warkenthien, South Dakota State
2009–10	(3) South Dakota State	79–75 (OT)	(1) Oral Roberts	Maria Boever, South Dakota State
2010–11	(3) South Dakota State	61–54	(4) Oakland	Kristin Rotert, South Dakota State
2011–12	(1) South Dakota State	78–77 (OT)	(3) UMKC	Jennie Sunnarborg, South Dakota State
2012–13	(1) South Dakota State	56–53	(3) South Dakota	Ashley Eide, South Dakota State
2013–14	(4) South Dakota	82–71	(6) Denver	Polly Harrington, South Dakota
2014–15	(2) South Dakota State	72–57	(1) South Dakota	Nicole Seekamp, South Dakota
2015–16	(2) South Dakota State	61–55	(1) South Dakota	Macy Miller, South Dakota State
2016–17	(1) Western Illinois	77–69 (OT)	(2) IUPUI	Emily Clemens, Western Illinois
2017–18	(2) South Dakota State	65–50	(1) South Dakota	Macy Miller, South Dakota State
2018–19	(1) South Dakota State	83–71	(2) South Dakota	Macy Miller, South Dakota State
2019–20	(1) South Dakota	63–58	(2) South Dakota State	Hannah Sjerven, South Dakota
2020–21	(2) South Dakota	66-43	(8) Omaha	Chloe Lamb, South Dakota
2021–22	(2) South Dakota	56–45	(1) South Dakota State	Chloe Lamb (2), South Dakota
2022–23	(1) South Dakota State	93–51	(6) Omaha	Haleigh Timmer, South Dakota State
2023–24	(1) South Dakota State	67–54	(2) North Dakota State	Paige Meyer, South Dakota State
2024–25	(1) South Dakota State	84–68	(2) Oral Roberts	Paige Meyer (2), South Dakota State
2025–26	(2) South Dakota State	64–51	(1) North Dakota State	Brooklyn Meyer, South Dakota State
2026–27				

== Tournament wins by school ==
School	Championships	Championship Years
**South Dakota State**	13	2009, 2010, 2011, 2012, 2013, 2015, 2016, 2018, 2019, 2023, 2024, 2025, 2026
**Oral Roberts**	5	1999, 2001, 2005, 2007, 2008
**South Dakota**	4	2014, 2020, 2021, 2022
Youngstown State	3	1996, 1998, 2000
Western Illinois	2	1995, 2017
Oakland	2	2002, 2006
Valparaiso	2	2003, 2004
Northern Illinois	1	1993
Green Bay	1	1994
Troy State	1	1997

- Teams in **bold** are currently in the Summit League. Oral Roberts left for the Southland Conference after the 2011–12 season, but returned for 2014–15.
- Teams in italics are former members.
- Among current Summit League members, Denver, Kansas City, North Dakota State, and Omaha have reached the tournament final but failed to win the championship, while North Dakota and St. Thomas have yet to advance to the tournament final. Kansas City, which rejoined in 2020–21, had competed under its academic identity of UMKC during its previous Summit tenure (1994–95 to 2012–13).

== Tournament locations ==
Year	Location	Notes
1993	Green Bay, Wisconsin	
1994	DeKalb, Illinois	
1995	Macomb, Illinois	
1996	Buffalo, New York	
1997	Buffalo, New York	
1998	Moline, Illinois	
1999	Moline, Illinois	
2000	Fort Wayne, Indiana	
2001	Fort Wayne, Indiana	
2002	Fort Wayne, Indiana	
2003	Kansas City, Missouri	
2004	Kansas City, Missouri	
2005	Tulsa, Oklahoma	
2006	Tulsa, Oklahoma	
2007	Tulsa, Oklahoma	
2008	Tulsa, Oklahoma	
2009	Sioux Falls, South Dakota	
2010	Sioux Falls, South Dakota	
2011	Sioux Falls, South Dakota	
2012	Sioux Falls, South Dakota	
2013	Sioux Falls, South Dakota	
2014	Sioux Falls, South Dakota	
2015	Sioux Falls, South Dakota	Highest attended Division I women's conference championship title game to date (6,926). Record has since been broken.
2016	Sioux Falls, South Dakota	
2017	Sioux Falls, South Dakota	
2018	Sioux Falls, South Dakota	Highest attended Division I women's conference championship title game to date (8,704).
2019	Sioux Falls, South Dakota	
2020	Sioux Falls, South Dakota	
2021	Sioux Falls, South Dakota	
2022	Sioux Falls, South Dakota	
2023	Sioux Falls, South Dakota	
2024	Sioux Falls, South Dakota	Highest collective attendance in Summit League women's basketball tournament history to date (36,504)
2025	Sioux Falls, South Dakota	
2026	Sioux Falls, South Dakota	

== See also ==
- Summit League men's basketball tournament
