= 2021–22 Summit League women's basketball season =

- League: NCAA Division I
- Sport: Basketball
- Teams: 10
- TV partner(s): WDAY'Z Xtra, Midco Sports Network

WNBA Draft
- Top draft pick: Hannah Sjerven, South Dakota
- Picked by: Minnesota Lynx, 28th overall

2021–22 NCAA Division I women's basketball season
- Regular season champions: South Dakota & South Dakota State
- Season MVP: Chloe Lamb, South Dakota

Summit League tournament
- Champions: South Dakota
- Runners-up: South Dakota State

Summit League women's basketball seasons
- ← 2020–21 2022–23 →

2021–22 Summit League women's basketball standings
	Conf.				Overall
Team	W		L	PCT	W		L	PCT
South Dakota State	17	–	1	.944	29	–	9	.763
South Dakota †	17	–	1	.944	29	–	6	.829
Kansas City	12	–	6	.667	23	–	9	.719
Oral Roberts	10	–	8	.556	16	–	15	.516
North Dakota	9	–	9	.500	15	–	15	.500
North Dakota State	7	–	11	.389	11	–	18	.379
Western Illinois	5	–	12	.294	14	–	15	.483
Denver	5	–	13	.278	10	–	20	.333
St. Thomas*	4	–	14	.222	7	–	21	.250
Omaha	3	–	14	.176	7	–	19	.269
† 2022 Summit League tournament winner * Ineligible for the 2022 NCAA tournament due to transition from Division III

The 2021–22 Summit League women's basketball season is scheduled to begin with practices in October 2021 followed by the 2021–22 NCAA Division I women's basketball season in November 2021. The conference is scheduled to begin in December 2021. This was the fifteenth season under the Summit League name and the 40th since the conference was established under its current charter as the Association of Mid-Continent Universities in 1982.

The Summit League tournament is scheduled for March 5–8, 2022 at the Denny Sanford Premier Center in Sioux Falls, South Dakota.

== Pre-season ==
=== Recruiting classes ===
Rankings
Team	ESPN	Signees
Denver	—	
Kansas City	―	
North Dakota	―	
North Dakota State	―	
Omaha	―	
Oral Roberts	―	
St. Thomas	―	
South Dakota	―	
South Dakota State	―	
Western Illinois	―	

=== Preseason watchlists ===
Below is a table of notable preseason watch lists.

Wooden	Naismith	Lieberman	Drysdale	Miller	McClain	Leslie	Wade
Myah Selland – South Dakota State	Myah Selland – South Dakota State; Hannah Sjerven – South Dakota	―	―	Myah Selland – South Dakota State	―	―	

=== Preseason polls ===
==== Summit League Coaches' Poll ====
Women's Basketball Preseason Poll (Coaches)
Place	Team	Points	First place votes
1.	South Dakota	712	20
2.	South Dakota State	672	18
3.	North Dakota State	544	―
4.	Kansas City	486	―
5.	Denver	385	―
6.	Oral Roberts	383	―
7.	Western Illinois	382	―
8.	Omaha	314	―
9.	North Dakota	181	―
10.	St. Thomas	147	―

=== Summit League Preseason All-Conference ===
==== Preseason All-Summit League First Team ====
Key
Symbol	Meaning
†	Preseason player of the year automatically earns a spot on the first team

Name	School	Pos.	Yr.	Ht.	Hometown (Last School)
Naomie Alnatas	Kansas City	Sr.	G	5'7	Cayenne, French Guiana (Chalon Basket)
Paiton Burckhard	South Dakota State	Jr.	F	6'0	Aberdeen, SD (Aberdeen Central HS)
Tylee Irwin	South Dakota State	Sr.	F	6'0	Wahpeton, ND (Wahpeton HS)
Chloe Lamb	South Dakota	R-Sr.	G	5'10	Onida, SD (Sully Buttes HS)
Myah Selland †	South Dakota State	R-Jr.	F	6'1	Letcher, SD (Sanborn Central/Woonsocket HS)
Hannah Sjerven	South Dakota	R-Sr.	C	6'2	Rogers, MN (Rogers HS)

==== Preseason All-Summit League Second Team ====
Name	School	Pos.	Yr.	Ht.	Hometown (Last School)
Meghan Boyd	Denver	Jr.	G	5'11	Eagle, ID (Eagle HS)
Uju Ezeudu	Denver	Jr.	F	6'0	Reynoldsburg, OH (Reynoldsburg HS)
Heaven Hamling	North Dakota State	Jr.	G	5'8	Grand Rapids, MN (Grand Rapids HS)
Liv Korngable	South Dakota	R-Sr.	G	5'10	Rochester, MN (Mayo HS)
Keni Jo Lippe	Oral Roberts	Gr.	G	5'9	Adair, OK (Adair HS)

=== Midseason watchlists ===
Below is a table of notable midseason watch lists.

Wooden	Naismith	Liberman	Drysdale	Miller	McClain	Leslie	Wade

=== Final watchlists ===
Below is a table of notable year end watch lists.

Wooden	Naismith	Liberman	Drysdale	Miller	McClain	Leslie	Wade

== Regular season ==
The schedule will be released in middle of June.

=== Records against other conferences ===
2021–22 records against non-conference foes as of (April 2, 2022):

Regular season

Power 7 Conferences	Record
American	1–5
ACC	1–1
Big East	3–3
Big Ten	0–3
Big 12	0–7
Pac-12	1–1
SEC	0–3
Power 7 Conferences Total	6–23
Other NCAA Division 1 Conferences	Record
America East	0–0
A-10	0–1
ASUN	1–0
Big Sky	3–5
Big South	0–1
Big West	1–2
CAA	0–0
C-USA	0–2
Horizon	4–1
Ivy League	1–0
MAAC	1–0
MAC	1–0
MEAC	1–0
MVC	6–5
Mountain West	1–6
NEC	0–0
OVC	3–0
Patriot League	0–1
SoCon	0–0
Southland	1–1
SWAC	1–0
Sun Belt	3–0
WAC	6–1
WCC	1–0
Other Division I Total	35–26
Division II Total	2–0
Division III Total	3–0
NCAA Division I Total	41–49
NAIA Conferences	Record
AMC	1–0
GPAC	4–0
HAAC	1–0
Independent	1–0
NSAA	2–0
SAC	2–0
NAIA Total	11–0

Post Season

Power 7 Conferences	Record
American	0–0
ACC	0–0
Big East	1–0
Big Ten	1–1
Big 12	1–0
Pac-12	1–0
SEC	2–0
Power 7 Conferences Total	6–1
Other NCAA Division 1 Conferences	Record
America East	0–0
A-10	0–0
ASUN	0–0
Big Sky	0–0
Big South	0–0
Big West	0–0
CAA	0–0
C-USA	0–0
Horizon	0–0
Ivy League	0–0
MAAC	0–0
MAC	1–0
MEAC	0–0
MVC	1–1
Mountain West	0–0
NEC	0–0
OVC	0–0
Patriot League	0–0
SoCon	0–0
Southland	0–0
SWAC	0–0
Sun Belt	0–0
WAC	0–0
WCC	0–0
Other Division I Total	2–1
NCAA Division I Total	8–2

=== Record against ranked non-conference opponents ===
This is a list of games against ranked opponents only (rankings from the AP Poll):

Date	Visitor	Home	Site	Significance	Score	Conference record
Nov 9	Omaha	No. 12 Iowa State	Hilton Coliseum ● Ames, IA	―	L 38–65	0–1
Nov 12	No. 1 South Carolina	South Dakota	Sanford Pentagon ● Sioux Falls, SD	Mammoth Sports Construction Invitational	L 41–72	0–2
Nov 15	South Dakota State	No. 14 Iowa State	Hilton Coliseum ● Ames, IA	―	L 56–75	0–3
Nov 26	No. 23 Texas A&M	South Dakota †	Sports and Fitness Center ● Saint Thomas, U.S. Virgin Islands	Paradise Jam	L 44–58	0–4
Nov 27	South Dakota State	No. 19 UCLA †	Hertz Arena ● Estero, FL	Gulf Coast Showcase	W 76–66	1–4
Dec 9	North Dakota State	No. 6 Arizona	McKale Center ● Tucson, AZ	―	L 47–59	1–5
Mar 20	South Dakota	No. 7 Baylor †	Ferrell Center ● Waco, TX	NCAA tournament (second round)	W 61–47	2–5
Mar 26	South Dakota	No. 12 Michigan †	Intrust Bank Arena ● Wichita, KS	NCAA tournament (Sweet 16)	L 49–52	2–6

Team rankings are reflective of AP poll when the game was played, not current or final ranking

† denotes game was played on neutral site

=== Conference schedule ===
This table summarizes the head-to-head results between teams in conference play.

	Denver	Kansas City	North Dakota	North Dakota State	Omaha	Oral Roberts	St. Thomas	South Dakota	South Dakota State	Western Illinois
vs. Denver	–	0–0	0–0	0–0	0–0	0–0	0–0	0–0	0–0	0–0
vs. Kansas City	0–0	–	0–0	0–0	0–0	0–0	0–0	0–0	0–0	0–0
vs. North Dakota	0–0	0–0	–	0–0	0–0	0–0	0–0	0–0	0–0	0–0
vs. North Dakota State	0–0	0–0	0–0	–	0–0	0–0	0–0	0–0	0–0	0–0
vs. Omaha	0–0	0–0	0–0	0–0	–	0–0	0–0	0–0	0–0	0–0
vs. Oral Roberts	0–0	0–0	0–0	0–0	0–0	–	0–0	0–0	0–0	0–0
vs. St. Thomas	0–0	0–0	0–0	0–0	0–0	0–0	–	0–0	0–0	0–0
vs. South Dakota	0–0	0–0	0–0	0–0	0–0	0–0	0–0	–	0–0	0–0
vs. South Dakota State	0–0	0–0	0–0	0–0	0–0	0–0	0–0	0–0	–	0–0
vs. Western Illinois	0–0	0–0	0–0	0–0	0–0	0–0	0–0	0–0	0–0	–
Total	0–0	0–0	0–0	0–0	0–0	0–0	0–0	0–0	0–0	0–0

=== Points scored ===
Team	For	Against	Difference
Denver	―	―	―
Kansas City	―	―	―
North Dakota	―	―	―
North Dakota State	―	―	―
Omaha	―	―	―
Oral Roberts	―	―	―
St. Thomas	―	―	―
South Dakota	―	―	―
South Dakota State	―	―	―
Western Illinois	―	―	―

Through November 8, 2021

=== Rankings ===
	Improvement in ranking
	Drop in ranking
RV	Received votes but were not ranked in Top 25
NV	No votes received

		Pre	Wk 2	Wk 3	Wk 4	Wk 5	Wk 6	Wk 7	Wk 8	Wk 9	Wk 10	Wk 11	Wk 12	Wk 13	Wk 14	Wk 15	Wk 16	Wk 17	Wk 18	Wk 19	Final
Denver	AP	NV	NV	NV	NV	NV	NV	NV	NV	NV	NV	NV									
Denver	C																				
Kansas City	AP	NV	NV	NV	NV	NV	NV	NV	NV	NV	NV	NV									
Kansas City	C																				
North Dakota	AP	NV	NV	NV	NV	NV	NV	NV	NV	NV	NV	NV									
North Dakota	C																				
North Dakota State	AP	NV	NV	NV	NV	NV	NV	NV	NV	NV	NV	NV									
North Dakota State	C																				
Omaha	AP	NV	NV	NV	NV	NV	NV	NV	NV	NV	NV	NV									
Omaha	C																				
Oral Roberts	AP	NV	NV	NV	NV	NV	NV	NV	NV	NV	NV	NV									
Oral Roberts	C																				
St. Thomas	AP	NV	NV	NV	NV	NV	NV	NV	NV	NV	NV	NV									
St. Thomas	C																				
South Dakota	AP	RV	NV	NV	NV	NV	NV	NV	NV	NV	NV	RV									
South Dakota	C																				
South Dakota State	AP	RV	NV	NV	NV	NV	NV	NV	NV	NV	NV	NV									
South Dakota State	C																				
Western Illinois	AP	NV	NV	NV	NV	NV	NV	NV	NV	NV	NV	NV									
Western Illinois	C																				

== Head coaches ==
=== Coaches ===
Note: Stats shown are before the beginning of the season. Overall and Summit League records are from time at current school.

Team	Head coach	Previous job	Seasons at school	Overall record	Summit record	Summit titles	NCAA tournaments	NCAA Final Fours	NCAA Championships
Denver	Doshia Woods	Tulane (recruiting coordinator)	2nd	7–16 (.304)	5–9 (.357)	0	0	0	0
Kansas City	Jacie Hoyt	Kansas State (assistant)	5th	58–56 (.509)	7–8 (.467) †	0	0 ♠	0	0
North Dakota	Mallory Bernhard	North Dakota (assistant)	2nd	2–19 (.095)	2–13 (.133)	0	0	0	0
North Dakota State	Jory Collins	Kansas (assistant)	3rd	26–28 (.481)	16-16 (.500)	0	0	0	0
Omaha	Carrie Banks	Ohio State (assistant)	2nd	7–13 (.350)	4–8 (.333)	0	0	0	0
Oral Roberts	Misti Cussen	Oral Roberts (assistant)	10th	129–137 (.485)	56–50 (.528) ‡	0	1	0	0
St. Thomas	Ruth Sinn	Apple Valley HS	17th	356–88 (.802)	0–0 (–)	0	0	0	0
South Dakota	Dawn Plitzuweit	Northern Kentucky	6th	129–30 (.811)	66–9 (.880)	2	2 ♠	0	0
South Dakota State	Aaron Johnston	South Dakota State (assistant)	22nd	513–170 (.751)	193–35 (.846)	9	10	0	0
Western Illinois	JD Gravina	Quincy	11th	156–146 (.517)	83–73 (.532)	0	1	0	0

Notes:

- † Kansas City joined to Summit League in Summer of 2020.
- ‡ Oral Roberts joined to Summit League in Summer of 2014.
- ♠ In 2020 earned the NCAA tournament berth but the NCAA tournament canceled due the COVID-19 pandemic.
- Overall and Summit League records, conference titles, etc. are from time at current school and are through the end the 2020–21 season.
- NCAA tournament appearances are from time at current school only.
- NCAA Final Fours and Championship include time at other schools

== Postseason ==
=== Summit League tournament ===
South Dakota won the conference tournament from March 5–8, 2022, at the Denny Sanford Premier Center, Sioux Falls, SD. The top eight teams from the conference regular season play at the tournament. Teams were seeded by conference record, with ties broken by record between the tied teams followed by record against the regular-season champion, after the NET rankings if necessary.

Quarterfinals; March 5 & 6 MidcoSN/ESPN+
1	South Dakota State	86
8	Denver	59
4	Oral Roberts	61
5	North Dakota	54
3	Kansas City	81
6	North Dakota State	74
2	South Dakota	75
7	Western Illinois	49

Semifinals; March 7 MidcoSN/ESPN+
1	South Dakota State	72
4	Oral Roberts	53
3	Kansas City	67
2	South Dakota	81

Championship; March 8 ESPNU
1	South Dakota State	45
2	South Dakota	56

=== NCAA tournament ===
One team from the conference were selected to participate: South Dakota. South Dakota State selected one of the "first four out" team, will act as standbys in the event a school is forced to withdraw before the start of the tournament due to COVID-19 protocols. But that didn't happen, so they participated in 2022 WNIT.

Seed	Region	School	First round	Second round	Sweet Sixteen	Elite Eight	Final Four	Championship
No. 10	Wichita Regional	South Dakota	defeated No. 7 Ole Miss 75–61	defeated No. 2 Baylor 61–47	lost to No. 3 Michigan 49–52	–	–	–
	1 Bid	W-L (%):	1–0 (1.000)	1–0 (1.000)	0–1 (.000)	0–0 (–)	0–0 (–)	TOTAL: 2–1 (.667)

=== National Invitation Tournament ===
Two teams from the conference were selected to participate: South Dakota State & Kansas City.

Bracket	School	First round	Second round	Third round	Quarterfinals	Semifinals	Final
Region 3	South Dakota State	defeated Ohio 87−57	defeated Minnesota 78−57	defeated Drake 84−66	defeated Alabama 78−73	defeated UCLA 62−59	defeated Seton Hall 82−50
Region 3	Kansas City	lost to Northern Iowa 58−75	−	−	−	−	−
2 Bids	TOTAL W-L (%): 6–1 (.857)	1–1 (.500)	1–0 (1.000)	1–0 (1.000)	1–0 (1.000)	1–0 (1.000)	1–0 (1.000)

Index to colors and formatting
Summit League member won
Summit League member lost

== Awards and honors ==
=== Players of the Week ===
Throughout the conference regular season, the Summit League offices named one or two players of the week each Monday.

Week	Player of the Week	School	Ref.
Nov. 15	Liv Korngable	South Dakota	
Nov. 22	Brooklyn McDavid	Kansas City	
Nov. 29	Naomie Alnatas	Kansas City	
Dec 6.	Danni Nichols	Western Illinois	
Dec 13.	Uju Ezeudu	Denver	
Dec 20.	Brooklyn McDavid (2)	Kansas City	
Dec 27.	Paige Meyer	South Dakota State	
Jan. 3	Chloe Lamb	South Dakota	
Jan 10.	Uju Ezeudu (2)	Denver	
Jan 17.	Kacie Borowicz	North Dakota	
Jan 24.	Kacie Borowicz (2)	North Dakota	
Jan. 31	Naomie Alnatas (2)	Kansas City	
Feb. 7	Naomie Alnatas (3)	Kansas City	
Feb. 14	Myah Selland	South Dakota State	
Feb. 21	Tirzah Moore	Oral Roberts	
Mar. 1	Chloe Lamb (2)	South Dakota	

School	Total
Kansas City	5
South Dakota	3
Denver	2
North Dakota	2
South Dakota State	2
Oral Roberts	1
Western Illinois	1

=== Summit League Awards ===
The Summit League announced its end of season awards on March 3, 2022 ahead of the start of the Summit League tournament.

2021 ACC Women's Basketball Individual Awards
Award	Recipient(s)
Player of the Year	Chloe Lamb – South Dakota
Coach of the Year	Aaron Johnston – South Dakota State
Defensive Player of the Year	Hannah Sjerven – South Dakota
Freshman of the Year	Tirzah Moore – Oral Roberts
Sixth Player of the Year	Grace Larkins – South Dakota
Newcomer of the Year	Brooklyn McDavid – Kansas City

== WNBA draft ==
The Summit League had one player selected in the WNBA Draft. Hannah Sjerven from South Dakota selected by Minnesota Lynx on the 3rd round 28th overall pick.

Player	Team	Round	Pick #	Position	School
Hannah Sjerven	Minnesota Lynx	3	28	Center	South Dakota
