= 2021–22 North Dakota State Bison women's basketball team =

American college basketball season

2021–22 North Dakota State Bison women's basketball
- Conference: Summit League
- Record: 11–18 (7–11 The Summit)
- Head coach: Jory Collins (3rd season)
- Associate head coach: Dylan Geissert
- Assistant coaches: Brooke Costley; Sandra Abston
- Home arena: Scheels Center

2021–22 Summit League women's basketball standings
	Conf.				Overall
Team	W		L	PCT	W		L	PCT
South Dakota State	17	–	1	.944	29	–	9	.763
South Dakota †	17	–	1	.944	29	–	6	.829
Kansas City	12	–	6	.667	23	–	9	.719
Oral Roberts	10	–	8	.556	16	–	15	.516
North Dakota	9	–	9	.500	15	–	15	.500
North Dakota State	7	–	11	.389	11	–	18	.379
Western Illinois	5	–	12	.294	14	–	15	.483
Denver	5	–	13	.278	10	–	20	.333
St. Thomas*	4	–	14	.222	7	–	21	.250
Omaha	3	–	14	.176	7	–	19	.269
† 2022 Summit League tournament winner * Ineligible for the 2022 NCAA tournament due to transition from Division III

The 2021–22 North Dakota State Bison women's basketball team represented North Dakota State University in the 2021–22 NCAA Division I women's basketball season. The Bison, led by third-year head coach Jory Collins, played their home games at the Scheels Center in Fargo, North Dakota, as members of the Summit League.

NDSU made the Summit League Tournament as the number 6 seed. They were defeated in the first round by Kansas City.

== Previous season ==
The Bison finished the 2020-21 season 15–9, 9–7 in Summit League play to finish in third place. In the Summit League Tournament, they defeated Denver in the quarterfinals, but lost to South Dakota in the semifinals. It was their best season finish since entering Division I in 2009.

== Roster ==
2021–22 North Dakota State Bison women's basketball team
Players
Coaches

Pos.	#	Name	Height	Year	Hometown
G	0	Reneya Hopkins	5 ft 6 in (1.68 m)	Sr	Midwest City, Oklahoma
G	4	Ellie Dague	5 ft 10 in (1.78 m)	Fr	Henning, Minnesota
G/F	5	Ryan Cobbins	6 ft 0 in (1.83 m)	Jr	Kansas City, Kansas
G	11	Heaven Hamling	5 ft 8 in (1.73 m)	Jr	Grand Rapids, Minnesota
G	13	Rachel Novak	5 ft 9 in (1.75 m)	So	Fort Collins, Colorado
F	14	Gabrielle Robinson Forde	6 ft 2 in (1.88 m)	Fr	Brampton, Ontario
F	20	Emily Behnke	6 ft 3 in (1.91 m)	So	Two Rivers, Wisconsin
F	22	Abbey Kubas	5 ft 11 in (1.8 m)	Fr	Dickinson, North Dakota
G/F	23	Olivia Skibiel	6 ft 0 in (1.83 m)	Jr	Snohomish, Washington
G	24	Abby Schulte	5 ft 10 in (1.78 m)	So	Maple Grove, Minnesota
G	32	Sophie Olson	5 ft 11 in (1.8 m)	Fr	El Dorado Hills, California
F	33	Katie Hildebrandt	6 ft 2 in (1.88 m)	Fr	McFarland, Wisconsin
F	34	Emily Dietz	6 ft 3 in (1.91 m)	Sr	West Fargo, North Dakota

Head coach

- Jory Collins (Emporia State University)

Assistant coach(es)

- Dylan Geissert (Emporia State University)
- Brooke Costley
- Sandra Abston

Legend

- (C) Team captain
- (S) Suspended
- (I) Ineligible
- (W) Walk-on
- Injured
- Current redshirt

Roster
Last update: January 18, 2022

== Schedule and results ==
Date time, TV	Rank^{#}	Opponent^{#}	Result	Record	Site (attendance) city, state
Non-conference regular season
November 11, 2021*; 7 PM, ESPN+		at Milwaukee	W 69-58	1-0	Klotsche Center (951); Milwaukee, WI
November 13, 2021*; 1 PM, ESPN+		at Green Bay	L 54-71	1-1	Kress Events Center (1,778); Green Bay, WI
November 17, 2021*; 7 PM, WDAY Xtra, ESPN+		Northern Iowa	L 63-76	1-2	Scheels Center (504); Fargo, ND
November 20, 2021*; 7 PM		Montana	L 63-65	1-3	Scheels Center (794); Fargo, ND
November 23, 2021*; 7 PM, WDAY Xtra, ESPN+		Dickinson State	W 95-42	2-3	Scheels Center; Fargo, ND
November 29, 2021*; 6:30 pm, Big 12 on ESPN+		at Kansas State	L 57-78	2-4	Bramlage Coliseum (2,213); Manhattan, KS
December 4, 2021*; 7 PM, WDAY Xtra, ESPN+		Bradley	W 83-72	3-4	Scheels Center (391); Fargo, ND
December 9, 2021*; 7:30 pm		at No. 10 Arizona	L 47-59	3-5	McKale Center (7,037); Tucson, AZ
December 12, 2021*; 2 PM, Mountain West Network		at Wyoming	L 45-71	3-6	Arena-Auditorium (2,085); Laramie, WY
December 19, 2021*; 1 PM, WDAY Xtra, ESPN+		Jamestown	W 82-36	4-6	Scheels Center (409); Fargo, ND
Summit League regular season
December 22, 2021; 7 PM, MidcoSN2		at North Dakota	W 67-61	5-6 (1-0)	Betty Engelstad Sioux Center (840); Grand Forks, ND
December 30, 2021; 7 PM, MidcoSN2, ESPN+		at South Dakota State	L 60-77	5-7 (1-1)	Frost Arena (1,563); Brookings, SD
January 1, 2022; 1 PM, MidcoSN, ESPN+		at South Dakota	L 38-65	5-8 (1-2)	Sanford Coyote Sports Center (1,632); Vermillion, SD
January 6, 2022; 7 PM, WDAY Xtra, ESPN+		Denver	W 74-68	6-8 (2-2)	Scheels Center (237); Fargo, ND
January 8, 2022; 1 PM, WDAY Xtra, ESPN+		Omaha	L 54-68	6-9 (2-3)	Scheels Center (202); Fargo, ND
January 13, 2022; 7 PM		at St. Thomas	L 62-73	6-10 (2-4)	Schoenecker Arena (547); St. Paul, MN
January 15, 2022; 2 PM		at Western Illinois	W 63-55	7-10 (3-4)	Western Hall; Macomb, IL
January 20, 2022; 7 PM, WDAY Xtra, ESPN+		Kansas City	L 62-67	7-11 (3-5)	Scheels Center (373); Fargo, ND
January 22, 2022; 1 PM, WDAY Xtra, ESPN+		Oral Roberts	W 74-70	8-11 (4-5)	Scheels Center (504); Fargo, ND
January 27, 2022; 7 PM, WDAY Xtra, ESPN+		South Dakota	L 59-78	8-12 (4-6)	Scheels Center (402); Fargo, ND
January 29, 2022; 7 PM, WDAY Xtra, ESPN+		South Dakota State	L 60-76	8-13 (4-7)	Scheels Center (841); Fargo, ND
February 3, 2022; 7 PM		at Omaha	W 69-53	9-13 (5-7)	Baxter Arena (232); Omaha, NE
February 5, 2022; 2 PM		at Denver	L 48-62	9-14 (5-8)	Hamilton Gymnasium (301); Denver, CO
February 10, 2022; 7 PM, WDAY Xtra, ESPN+		Western Illinois	L 59-61	9-15 (5-9)	Scheels Center (330); Fargo, ND
February 12, 2022; 1 PM, WDAY Xtra, ESPN+		St. Thomas	W 69-60	10-15 (6-9)	Scheels Center (656); Fargo, ND
February 17, 2022; 7 PM		at Oral Roberts	L 64-68	10-16 (6-10)	Mabee Center (221); Tulsa, OK
February 19, 2022; 2 PM		at Kansas City	L 67-76	10-17 (6-11)	Swinney Recreation Center (856); Kansas City, MO
February 26, 2022; 1 PM, WDAY Xtra, ESPN+		North Dakota	W 81-64	11-17 (7-11)	Scheels Center (874); Fargo, ND
Summit League Tournament
March 6, 2022; 2:45 pm, MidcoSN, ESPN+	(6)	vs. (3) Kansas City	L 74-81	11-18	Denny Sanford Premier Center (3,825); Sioux Falls, SD
*Non-conference game. ^{#}Rankings from AP Poll. (#) Tournament seedings in parentheses. All times are in Central.
