= 2022 Summit League women's basketball tournament =

- Classification: Division I
- Season: 2021–22
- Teams: 8
- Site: Denny Sanford Premier Center; Sioux Falls, South Dakota
- Champions: South Dakota (4th title)
- Winning coach: Dawn Plitzuweit (3rd title)
- MVP: Chloe Lamb (South Dakota)
- Television: MidcoSN; ESPN+ ESPNU

2021–22 Summit League women's basketball standings
	Conf.				Overall
Team	W		L	PCT	W		L	PCT
South Dakota State	17	–	1	.944	29	–	9	.763
South Dakota †	17	–	1	.944	29	–	6	.829
Kansas City	12	–	6	.667	23	–	9	.719
Oral Roberts	10	–	8	.556	16	–	15	.516
North Dakota	9	–	9	.500	15	–	15	.500
North Dakota State	7	–	11	.389	11	–	18	.379
Western Illinois	5	–	12	.294	14	–	15	.483
Denver	5	–	13	.278	10	–	20	.333
St. Thomas*	4	–	14	.222	7	–	21	.250
Omaha	3	–	14	.176	7	–	19	.269
† 2022 Summit League tournament winner * Ineligible for the 2022 NCAA tournament due to transition from Division III

The 2022 Summit League women's basketball tournament was a post-season women's basketball tournament for the Summit League. The tournament took place March 5–8, 2022, at the Denny Sanford Premier Center in Sioux Falls, South Dakota. The top eight teams in the final conference standings qualified for the tournament.

== Seeds ==
The top eight teams by conference record in the Summit League are eligible to compete in the conference tournament. Teams are to be seeded by record within the conference, with a tiebreaker system to seed teams with identical conference records.

Seed	School	Conference Record	Tiebreaker
1	South Dakota State	17–1	NCAA NET Ranking 34
2	South Dakota	17–1	NCAA NET Ranking 36
3	Kansas City	12–6	
4	Oral Roberts	10–8	
5	North Dakota	9–9	
6	North Dakota State	7–11	
7	Western Illinois	5–12	
8	Denver	5–13	

== Schedule and results ==
Game	Time	Matchup	Score	Television
Quarterfinals - Saturday, March 5
1	12:30 PM	No. 1 South Dakota State vs. No. 8 Denver	86-59	MidcoSN/ESPN+
2	3:00 PM	No. 2 South Dakota vs. No. 7 Western Illinois	75-49	MidcoSN/ESPN+
Quarterfinals - Sunday, March 6
3	12:30 PM	No. 4 Oral Roberts vs. No. 5 North Dakota	61-54	MidcoSN/ESPN+
4	3:00 PM	No. 3 Kansas City vs. No. 6 North Dakota State	81-74	MidcoSN/ESPN+
Semifinals - Monday, March 7
5	12:30 PM	No. 1 South Dakota State vs. No. 4 Oral Roberts	72-53	MidcoSN/ESPN+
6	3:00 PM	No. 2 South Dakota vs. No. 3 Kansas City	81-67	MidcoSN/ESPN+
Final - Tuesday, March 8
7	1:00 PM	No. 1 South Dakota State vs. No. 2 South Dakota	56-45	ESPNU
*Game times in CST. Rankings denote tournament seed. Reference:

== Bracket ==
Quarterfinals; March 5 & 6 MidcoSN/ESPN+
1	South Dakota State	86
8	Denver	59
4	Oral Roberts	61
5	North Dakota	54
3	Kansas City	81
6	North Dakota State	74
2	South Dakota	75
7	Western Illinois	49

Semifinals; March 7 MidcoSN/ESPN+
1	South Dakota State	72
4	Oral Roberts	53
3	Kansas City	67
2	South Dakota	81

Championship; March 8 ESPNU
1	South Dakota State	45
2	South Dakota	56

== All-Tournament team ==
The following players were named to the All-Tournament team:

Player	School
Chloe Lamb (MVP)	South Dakota
Hannah Sjerven	South Dakota
Paiton Burckhard	South Dakota State
Myah Selland	South Dakota State
Naomie Alnatas	Kansas City
