= 2021–22 Oral Roberts Golden Eagles women's basketball team =

Intercollegiate basketball season

2021–22 Oral Roberts Golden Eagles women's basketball
- Conference: Summit League
- Head coach: Misti Cussen (10th season)
- Assistant coaches: Kyron Stokes; Lee Mayberry; Jeff Zinn
- Home arena: Mabee Center

2021–22 Summit League women's basketball standings
	Conf.				Overall
Team	W		L	PCT	W		L	PCT
South Dakota State	17	–	1	.944	29	–	9	.763
South Dakota †	17	–	1	.944	29	–	6	.829
Kansas City	12	–	6	.667	23	–	9	.719
Oral Roberts	10	–	8	.556	16	–	15	.516
North Dakota	9	–	9	.500	15	–	15	.500
North Dakota State	7	–	11	.389	11	–	18	.379
Western Illinois	5	–	12	.294	14	–	15	.483
Denver	5	–	13	.278	10	–	20	.333
St. Thomas*	4	–	14	.222	7	–	21	.250
Omaha	3	–	14	.176	7	–	19	.269
† 2022 Summit League tournament winner * Ineligible for the 2022 NCAA tournament due to transition from Division III

The 2021–22 Oral Roberts Golden Eagles women's basketball team represented Oral Roberts University in the 2021–22 NCAA Division I women's basketball season. The Golden Eagles, led by tenth-year head coach Misti Cussen, competed in the Summit League. They played home games in Mabee Center in Tulsa, Oklahoma.

== Previous season ==
The Golden Eagles went 6–15 overall and 4–8 in conference play in the 2020–21 season, finishing seventh.

They played the previous year's champion South Dakota in the quarterfinals but lost 66–89.

== Offseason ==
=== Departures ===
Name	Pos.	Height	Year	Hometown	Reason for departure
Bo Teulings	F	6'0"	Junior	's-Hertogenbosch, Netherlands	Transferred to Oklahoma Wesleyan
Gem Summers	G	5'9"	Junior	Tulsa, OK	Transferred
Courtlyn Loudermill	G	5'7"	Sophomore	Killeen, TX	Transferred to Panola College

=== Additions ===
Name	Number	Pos.	Height	Year	Hometown	Previous school
Hannah Cooper	10	G	5'7"	Junior	El Paso, TX	Western Colorado University
Delaney Nix	14	G	5'8"	Senior	Tahlequah, OK	West Texas A&M
Katie Scott	42	C	6'3"	Sophomore	Carl Junction, MO	Grand Canyon University

=== 2021 recruiting class ===
College recruiting information
Name	Hometown	School	Height	Weight	Commit date
Trinity Moore; G	Oklahoma City, OK	Jones High School	6 ft 0 in (1.83 m)	N/A	Nov 11, 2020
Trinity Moore; G	Recruit ratings: No ratings found				
Tirzah Moore; G	Oklahoma City, OK	Jones High School	6 ft 0 in (1.83 m)	N/A	Nov 11, 2020
Tirzah Moore; G	Recruit ratings: No ratings found				
Overall recruit ranking:
Note: In many cases, Scout, Rivals, 247Sports, On3, and ESPN may conflict in their listings of height and weight.; In these cases, the average was taken. ESPN grades are on a 100-point scale.; Sources:

== Preseason ==
=== Summit League Preseason poll ===
The Summit League Preseason poll and other preseason awards was released on October 12, 2021 with the Golden Eagles selected to finish in sixth place in the Summit League.

Coaches Poll
Predicted finish	Team	Votes (1st place)
1	South Dakota	712 (20)
2	South Dakota State	672 (18)
3	North Dakota State	544
4	Kansas City	486
5	Denver	385
6	Oral Roberts	383
7	Western Illinois	382
8	Omaha	314
9	North Dakota	181
10	St. Thomas	147

=== Preseason all-Summit teams ===
The Golden Eagles had one player selected to the preseason all-Summit teams.

Second team

Keni Jo Lippe

== Roster ==
2021–22 Oral Roberts Golden Eagles women's basketball team
Players
Coaches

Pos.	#	Name	Height	Year	Previous school	Hometown
G	0	Tyaija Coleman	5 ft 8 in (1.73 m)	So	Trinity Christian	Arlington, TX
G	1	Nena Taylor	5 ft 9 in (1.75 m)	RS So	Parsons HS	Parsons, KS
G	2	Tierney Coleman	5 ft 8 in (1.73 m)	So	Trinity Christian	Arlington, TX
G	3	Corrie Anderson	5 ft 8 in (1.73 m)	So	Colorado Springs Christian	Colorado Springs, CO
F	4	Hannah Giddey	6 ft 2 in (1.88 m)	So	Albert Park College	Melbourne, Australia
C	5	Manaya Jones	6 ft 2 in (1.88 m)	GS	Raleigh-Egypt; Grand Canyon	Memphis, TN
G	10	Hannah Cooper	5 ft 7 in (1.7 m)	Jr	Andress HS; Western Colorado	El Paso, TX
G	11	Ariel Walker	5 ft 6 in (1.68 m)	Sr	Ozark HS; Allen CC	Ozark, AR
G	12	Camryn Hill	5 ft 11 in (1.8 m)	So	South Grand Prairie HS	Dallas, TX
G	14	Delaney Nix	5 ft 8 in (1.73 m)	Sr	Tahlequah HS; West Texas A&M	Tahlequah, OK
C	20	Regan Schumacher	6 ft 2 in (1.88 m)	GS	Olathe East HS	Olathe, KS
C	21	Sinetra Jones	6 ft 3 in (1.91 m)	Jr	Manassas HS; Dyersburg CC	Memphis, TN
F	22	Faith Paramore	6 ft 0 in (1.83 m)	So	Haven HS	Haven, KS
F	32	Addisyn Moore	5 ft 10 in (1.78 m)	So	Trinity Christian	Dallas, TX
G	33	Keni Jo Lippe	5 ft 9 in (1.75 m)	GS	Adair HS	Adair, OK
F	35	Trinity Moore	6 ft 0 in (1.83 m)	Fr	Jones HS	Oklahoma City, OK
C	42	Katie Scott	6 ft 3 in (1.91 m)	So	Carl Junction HS; Grand Canyon	Carl Junction, MO
F	45	Tirzah Moore	6 ft 0 in (1.83 m)	Fr	Jones HS	Oklahoma City, OK

Head coach

- Misti Cussen (Southern Nazarene)

Assistant coach(es)

- Kyron Stokes (Oral Roberts)
- Lee Mayberry (Arkansas)
- Jeff Zinn (Northwestern Oklahoma State)

Legend

- (C) Team captain
- (S) Suspended
- (I) Ineligible
- (W) Walk-on
- Injured
- Current redshirt

Roster
Last update: August 21, 2024

== Schedule ==
Date time, TV	Rank^{#}	Opponent^{#}	Result	Record	High points	High rebounds	High assists	Site (attendance) city, state
Exhibition
November 3, 2021*; 7:00 p.m.		Rogers State	W 97–63	–	23 – Scott	7 – tied	8 – Cooper	Mabee Center (465); Tulsa, OK
Non-conference regular season (5-6)
November 9, 2021*; 7:00 p.m.		UNLV	L 81–85	0–1	21 – Lippe	9 – Tr. Moore	3 – Lippe	Mabee Center (389); Tulsa, OK
November 15, 2021*; 7:00 p.m.		at Colorado State	L 56–71	0–2	18 – Cooper	13 – Paramore	2 – tied	Moby Arena (862); Fort Collins, CO
November 17, 2021*; 7:00 p.m.		at SMU	L 44–81	0–3	11 – Lippe	5 – tied	3 – Nix	Moody Coliseum (421); Dallas, TX
November 21, 2021*; 2:00 p.m.		Tulsa; Rivalry	L 55–69	0–4	14 – Walker	6 – tied	3 – Cooper	Mabee Center (2,632); Tulsa, OK
November 27, 2021*; 2:00 p.m.		Arkansas State; ORU Thanksgiving Classic	W 81–62	1–4	20 – Ti. Moore	6 – tied	5 – Scott	Mabee Center; Tulsa, OK
November 28, 2021*; 2:00 p.m.		Little Rock; ORU Thanksgiving Classic	W 74–56	2–4	13 – tied	7 – Lippe	4 – Cooper	Mabee Center (1,565); Tulsa, OK
December 1, 2021*; 6:00 p.m., ESPN+		at Wichita State	L 62–78	2–5	17 – Scott	8 – tied	5 – Cooper	Charles Koch Arena (1,317); Wichita, KS
December 5, 2021*; 2:30 p.m.		USAO	W 73–26	3–5	19 – Scott	12 – Schumacher	5 – Cooper	Mabee Center (1,448); Tulsa, OK
December 10, 2021*; 11:00 a.m.		Central Christian	W 120–52	4–5	18 – Tr. Moore	5 – Scott	6 – tied	Mabee Center (3,645); Tulsa, OK
December 13, 2021*; 6:00 p.m., ESPN+		at Tarleton State	L 55–59	4–6	13 – Ti. Moore	7 – Cooper	3 – tied	Wisdom Gym (640); Stephenville, TX
December 15, 2021*; 6:00 p.m., ESPN+		at Abilene Christian	W 69–66	5–6	16 – Lippe	11 – Ti. Moore	5 – Cooper	Moody Coliseum (251); Abilene, TX
Summit League regular season (10-8)
December 20, 2021; 2:00 p.m.		South Dakota	L 59–90	5–7 (0–1)	17 – Ti. Moore	9 – Ti. Moore	5 – Cooper	Mabee Center (1,432); Tulsa, OK
December 22, 2021; 2:00 p.m.		South Dakota State	L 51–71	5–8 (0–2)	18 – Ti. Moore	8 – Ti. Moore	2 – Paramore	Mabee Center (1,468); Tulsa, OK
December 30, 2021; 9:00 p.m.		at Denver	Rescheduled due to COVID-19 to January 10					Magness Arena; Denver, CO
January 1, 2022; 1:00 p.m.		at Omaha	W 50–45	6–8 (1–2)	14 – Ti. Moore	9 – Schumacher	2 – tied	Baxter Arena (199); Omaha, NE
January 6, 2022; 7:00 p.m.		St. Thomas	Rescheduled due to COVID-19 to January 17					Mabee Center; Tulsa, OK
January 8, 2022; 2:00 p.m.		Western Illinois	Rescheduled due to COVID-19 to February 14					Mabee Center; Tulsa, OK
January 10, 2022; 5:00 p.m.		at Denver	W 62–53	7–8 (2–2)	14 – Cooper	11 – Ti. Moore	2 – tied	Hamilton Gymnasium (17); Denver, CO
January 15, 2022; 2:00 p.m., ORUSN		Kansas City	W 77–66	8–8 (3–2)	21 – Ti. Moore	7 – Scott	4 – tied	Mabee Center (1,454); Tulsa, OK
January 17, 2022; 12:00 p.m.		St. Thomas	W 72–44	9–8 (4–2)	16 – Nix	8 – Scott	3 – Cooper	Mabee Center (1,337); Tulsa, OK
January 20, 2022; 7:00 p.m.		at North Dakota	L 34–53	9–9 (4–3)	6 – tied	5 – Schumacher	1 – tied	Betty Engelstad Sioux Center (1,112); Grand Forks, ND
January 22, 2022; 1:00 p.m.		at North Dakota State	L 70–74	9–10 (4–4)	29 – Ti. Moore	6 – Cooper	5 – Ti. Moore	Scheels Center (504); Fargo, ND
January 27, 2022; 7:00 p.m.		Omaha	W 64–55	10–10 (5–4)	15 – Nix	8 – Scott	4 – Scott	Mabee Center (1,455); Tulsa, OK
January 29, 2022; 2:00 p.m.		Denver	L 64–69 ^{OT}	10–11 (5–5)	25 – Ti. Moore	10 – Ti. Moore	4 – Scott	Mabee Center (1,413); Tulsa, OK
February 3, 2022; 6:00 p.m.		at Western Illinois	W 71–55	11–11 (6–5)	20 – Lippe	10 – Scott	5 – Cooper	Western Hall (452); Macomb, IL
February 5, 2022; 1:00 p.m.		at St. Thomas	W 73–67 ^{OT}	12–11 (7–5)	17 – Scott	7 – Schumacher	6 – Scott	Schoenecker Arena (275); St. Paul, MN
February 12, 2022; 2:00 p.m.		at Kansas City	L 63–69	12–12 (7–6)	18 – Ti. Moore	8 – Lippe	6 – Cooper	Municipal Auditorium (701); Kansas City, MO
February 14, 2022; 4:00 p.m.		Western Illinois	W 93–74	13–12 (8–6)	25 – Ti. Moore	8 – Ti. Moore	10 – Scott	Mabee Center (1,310); Tulsa, OK
February 17, 2022; 7:00 p.m., ORUSN		North Dakota State	W 68–64	14–12 (9–6)	18 – Ti. Moore	7 – Ti. Moore	5 – Lippe	Mabee Center (221); Tulsa, OK
February 19, 2022; 2:00 p.m., ORUSN		North Dakota	W 89–73	15–12 (10–6)	29 – Ti. Moore	8 – tied	5 – Cooper	Mabee Center (396); Tulsa, OK
February 24, 2022; 7:00 p.m.		at South Dakota State	L 48–84	15–13 (10–7)	15 – Ti. Moore	4 – Ti. Moore	4 – Scott	Frost Arena (1,363); Brookings, SD
February 26, 2022; 1:00 p.m.		at South Dakota	L 49–78	15–14 (10–8)	18 – Ti. Moore	5 – tied	4 – Lippe	Sanford Coyote Sports Center (2,463); Vermillion, SD
Summit League women's tournament (1-1)
March 6, 2022; 12:30 p.m., ESPN+	(4)	vs. (5) North Dakota; Quarterfinals	W 61–54	16–14	22 – Lippe	7 – Ti. Moore	2 – tied	Denny Sanford Premier Center (4,825); Sioux Falls, SD
March 7, 2022; 12:30 p.m., ESPN+	(4)	vs. (1) South Dakota State; Semifinals	L 53–72	16–15	17 – Ti. Moore	8 – tied	3 – Cooper	Denny Sanford Premier Center (6,518); Sioux Falls, SD
*Non-conference game. ^{#}Rankings from AP poll. (#) Tournament seedings in parentheses. All times are in Central.

== Team and individual statistics ==
Individual player statistics (Final)
			Minutes		Scoring		Total FGs			3-point FGs			Free throws			Rebounds								
Player	GP	GS	Tot	Avg	Pts	Avg	FG	FGA	Pct	3FG	3FA	Pct	FT	FTA	Pct	Off	Def	Tot	Avg	A	PF	TO	Stl	Blk
Tirzah Moore	31	29	785	25.3	456	14.7	184	343	53.6%	0	0	0.0%	88	134	65.7%	63	124	187	6.0	28	48	43	26	37
Keni Jo Lippe	30	28	840	28.0	284	9.5	76	229	33.2%	23	76	30.3%	109	128	85.2%	30	78	108	3.6	50	57	55	37	1
Katie Scott	31	24	588	19.0	289	9.3	96	223	43.0%	5	20	25.0%	92	117	78.6%	42	96	138	4.5	59	70	61	18	14
Delaney Nix	31	4	829	26.7	217	7.0	74	205	36.1%	59	169	34.9%	10	13	76.9%	2	82	84	2.7	50	37	44	24	1
Hannah Cooper	31	28	865	27.9	203	6.5	59	194	30.4%	14	53	26.4%	71	97	73.2%	18	91	109	3.5	79	53	90	50	2
Ariel Walker	31	27	765	24.7	173	5.6	59	185	31.9%	32	122	26.2%	23	38	60.5%	11	62	73	2.4	41	53	46	52	2
Trinity Moore	31	0	334	10.8	138	4.5	57	124	46.0%	1	6	16.7%	23	29	79.3%	26	47	73	2.4	10	35	24	15	13
Regan Schumacher	31	9	572	18.5	120	3.9	51	119	42.9%	2	6	33.3%	16	26	61.5%	41	88	129	4.2	20	48	33	18	19
Faith Paramore	27	4	373	13.8	81	3.0	30	94	31.9%	8	43	18.6%	13	20	65.0%	20	46	66	2.4	20	21	29	3	6
Tierney Coleman	8	0	67	8.4	24	3.0	7	22	31.8%	2	8	25.0%	8	13	61.5%	3	10	13	1.6	9	4	8	5	1
Corrie Anderson	2	0	12	6.0	5	2.5	2	6	33.3%	1	4	25.0%	0	0	0.0%	0	2	2	1.0	0	0	0	0	0
Camryn Hill	6	0	54	9.0	13	2.2	3	21	14.3%	2	10	20.0%	5	8	62.5%	3	8	11	1.8	0	6	2	1	3
Nena Taylor	17	2	121	7.1	29	1.7	10	44	22.7%	5	21	23.8%	4	6	66.7%	6	18	24	1.4	2	16	11	13	1
Hannah Giddey	8	0	29	3.6	7	0.9	3	5	60.0%	0	0	0.0%	1	2	50.0%	0	4	4	0.5	3	0	0	0	1
Addisyn Moore	3	0	16	5.3	2	0.7	1	5	20.0%	0	2	0.0%	0	1	0.0%	3	0	3	1.0	0	0	3	1	0
Total	31	–	6250	201.6	2041	65.8	712	1819	39.1%	154	540	28.5%	463	632	73.3%	342	812	1154	37.2	371	448	460	263	101
Opponents	31	–	6250	201.6	2015	65.0	766	1845	41.5%	192	626	30.7%	291	412	70.6%	309	825	1134	36.6	377	522	493	232	131

Legend
GP	Games played	GS	Games started	Avg	Average per game
FG	Field goals made	FGA	Field goal attempts	Off	Offensive rebounds
Def	Defensive rebounds	A	Assists	TO	Turnovers
Blk	Blocks	Stl	Steals	High	Team high

== Honors ==
=== Summit League Player of the Week ===
- February 21, 2022 – Tirzah Moore

=== Postseason awards ===
- Freshman of the Year
  Tirzah Moore
- All-Summit League Team
  Tirzah Moore, second team
- Summit League All-Newcomer Team
  Tirzah Moore
