= 2021–22 South Dakota Coyotes women's basketball team =

Intercollegiate basketball season

2021–22 South Dakota Coyotes women's basketball

Summit League regular season co-champions Summit League tournament champions

NCAA tournament, Sweet Sixteen
- Conference: Summit League
- Record: 29–6 (17–1 The Summit)
- Head coach: Dawn Plitzuweit (6th season)
- Assistant coaches: Jason Jeschke; Aaron Horn; Jenna Schlafke
- Home arena: Sanford Coyote Sports Center

2021–22 Summit League women's basketball standings
	Conf.				Overall
Team	W		L	PCT	W		L	PCT
South Dakota State	17	–	1	.944	29	–	9	.763
South Dakota †	17	–	1	.944	29	–	6	.829
Kansas City	12	–	6	.667	23	–	9	.719
Oral Roberts	10	–	8	.556	16	–	15	.516
North Dakota	9	–	9	.500	15	–	15	.500
North Dakota State	7	–	11	.389	11	–	18	.379
Western Illinois	5	–	12	.294	14	–	15	.483
Denver	5	–	13	.278	10	–	20	.333
St. Thomas*	4	–	14	.222	7	–	21	.250
Omaha	3	–	14	.176	7	–	19	.269
† 2022 Summit League tournament winner * Ineligible for the 2022 NCAA tournament due to transition from Division III

The 2021–22 South Dakota Coyotes women's basketball team represented the University of South Dakota in the 2021–22 NCAA Division I women's basketball season. The Coyotes were led by sixth-year head coach Dawn Plitzuweit and competed in the Summit League. They played home games in Sanford Coyote Sports Center in Vermillion, South Dakota. The Coyotes finished the season 29–6, sharing the Summit League regular season championship with South Dakota State, earning a 17–1 conference record. After winning the 2021–22 Summit League tournament, South Dakota received an automatic bid to the 2022 NCAA Division I women's basketball tournament. Surprising Ole Miss, the Coyotes upset 2nd seeded Baylor to advance to the Sweet Sixteen for the school's first time.

This was Plitzuweit's last season at USD. Shortly after the season, she left for the head coaching vacancy at West Virginia.

== Roster ==
2021–22 South Dakota Coyotes women's basketball team
Players
Coaches

Pos.	#	Name	Height	Year	Previous school	Hometown
G	2	Liv Korngable	5 ft 10 in (1.78 m)	RS Sr	Mayo HS	Rochester, MN
G	3	Macy Guebert	5 ft 9 in (1.75 m)	Jr	Eastview HS	Apple Valley, MN
F	10	Morgan Hansen	6 ft 0 in (1.83 m)	RS Fr	Lincoln	Sioux Falls, SD
F	14	Regan Sankey	6 ft 1 in (1.85 m)	Sr	Lincoln East HS	Lincoln, NE
F	20	Carley Duffney	5 ft 10 in (1.78 m)	Fr	Preble	Green Bay, WI
G	21	Grace Larkins	5 ft 9 in (1.75 m)	Fr	Southeast Polk	Altoona, IA
G	22	Chloe Lamb	5 ft 10 in (1.78 m)	RS Sr	Sully Buttes HS	Onida, SD
C	23	Natalie Mazurek	6 ft 2 in (1.88 m)	RS Fr	Eden Prairie	Eden Prairie, MN
G	25	Cassidy Carson	6 ft 1 in (1.85 m)	Fr	Eastview	Eagan, MN
F	30	Jeniah Ugofsky	5 ft 11 in (1.8 m)	Fr	Harrisburg HS	Harrisburg, SD
C	31	Aspen Williston	6 ft 4 in (1.93 m)	Jr	Broken Bow	Broken Bow, OK
G	32	Kyah Watson	5 ft 10 in (1.78 m)	RS Fr	Stevens	Rapid City, SD
C	34	Hannah Sjerven	6 ft 2 in (1.88 m)	RS Sr	Rogers HS; New Mexico	Rogers, MN
F	35	Allison Peplowski	6 ft 1 in (1.85 m)	Jr	Williamston HS	Williamston, MI
F	41	Alexi Hempe	6 ft 0 in (1.83 m)	RS So	TPLS Christian Academy	Fredericksburg, VA
G	42	Maddy Krull	5 ft 9 in (1.75 m)	RS Fr	Millard South	Omaha, NE

Head coach

- Dawn Plitzuweit (Michigan Tech)

Assistant coach(es)

- Jason Jeschke (Southwestern (KS))
- Aaron Horn (Toledo)
- Ariel Braker (Notre Dame)

Legend

- (C) Team captain
- (S) Suspended
- (I) Ineligible
- (W) Walk-on
- Injured
- Current redshirt

Roster

== Schedule ==
Date time, TV	Rank^{#}	Opponent^{#}	Result	Record	High points	High rebounds	High assists	Site (attendance) city, state
Non-conference regular season (5–6)
November 9, 2021*; 7:00 pm, ESPN+		Oklahoma	L 71–73	0–1	22 – Korngable	13 – Sjerven	6 – Korngable	Sanford Coyote Sports Center (3,106); Vermillion, SD
November 12, 2021*; 6:00 pm, ESPNews		vs. No. 1 South Carolina	L 41–72	0–2	24 – Korngable	5 – Korngable	1 – Tied	Sanford Pentagon (2,845); Sioux Falls, SD
November 15, 2021*; 6:00 pm, ESPN+		at Drake	W 61–46	1–2	25 – Sjerven	12 – Sjerven	6 – Korngable	Knapp Center (1,733); Des Moines, IA
November 18, 2021*; 7:00 pm		Briar Cliff	W 83–35	2–2	15 – Lamb	9 – Ugofsky	4 – Tied	Sanford Coyote Sports Center (1,158); Vermillion, SD
November 25, 2021*; 4:55 pm, ESPN3		vs. Northwestern; Paradise Jam Tournament	L 57–73	2–3	25 – Lamb	5 – Tied	7 – Korngable	Sports and Fitness Center; Saint Thomas, U.S. Virgin Islands
November 26, 2021*; 7:00 pm, ESPN3		vs. No. 23 Texas A&M; Paradise Jam Tournament	L 44–58	2–4	11 – Korngable	7 – Krull	4 – Lamb	Sports and Fitness Center; Saint Thomas, U.S. Virgin Islands
November 27, 2021*; 4:45 pm, ESPN3		vs. Pittsburgh; Paradise Jam Tournament	W 72–61 ^{OT}	3–4	30 – Lamb	11 – Tied	3 – Lamb	Sports and Fitness Center (897); Saint Thomas, U.S. Virgin Islands
December 4, 2021*; 1:00 pm, MIDCO / ESPN+		Wichita State	W 71–59	4–4	35 – Sjerven	8 – Lamb	5 – Korngable	Sanford Coyote Sports Center (1,743); Vermillion, SD
December 6, 2021*; 7:00 pm, MIDCO / ESPN+		Bradley	W 62–39	5–4	12 – Sjerven	8 – Watson	3 – Tied	Sanford Coyote Sports Center (1,497); Vermillion, SD
December 10, 2021*; 7:00 pm		Valparaiso	W 51–31	6–4	11 – Lamb	11 – Watson	3 – Lamb	Sanford Coyote Sports Center (1,114); Vermillion, SD
December 16, 2021*; 6:30 pm, FloSports		at Creighton	W 73–71	7–4	20 – Lamb	8 – Sjerven	6 – Korngable	D. J. Sokol Arena (1,067); Omaha, NE
Summit League regular season (17–1)
December 20, 2021; 2:00 pm		at Oral Roberts	W 90–59	8–4 (1–0)	18 – Lamb	5 – Tied	5 – Lamb	Mabee Center (1,432); Tulsa, OK
December 22, 2021; 2:00 pm		at Kansas City	W 67–57	9–4 (2–0)	20 – Korngable	8 – Tied	5 – Korngable	Swinney Recreation Center (765); Kansas City, MO
December 30, 2021; 7:00 pm		North Dakota	W 85–46	10–4 (3–0)	18 – Sjerven	10 – Sjerven	4 – Watson	Sanford Coyote Sports Center (1,812); Vermillion, SD
January 1, 2022; 1:00 pm, MIDCO / ESPN+		North Dakota State	W 65–38	11–4 (4–0)	27 – Lamb	5 – Tied	4 – Tied	Sanford Coyote Sports Center (1,632); Vermillion, SD
January 8, 2022; 1:00 pm, MIDCO / ESPN+		South Dakota State	W 65–42	12–4 (5–0)	15 – Korngable	13 – Sjerven	4 – Tied	Sanford Coyote Sports Center (3,513); Vermillion, SD
January 13, 2022; 8:00 pm		at Denver	W 79–51	13–4 (6–0)	14 – Tied	5 – Peplowski	6 – Lamb	Hamilton Gymnasium (254); Denver, CO
January 15, 2022; 1:00 pm		at Omaha	W 68–45	14–4 (7–0)	18 – Korngable	6 – Sjerven	5 – Tied	Baxter Arena (431); Omaha, NE
January 20, 2022; 7:00 pm, MIDCO / ESPN+		Western Illinois	W 70–53	15–4 (8–0)	16 – Korngable	6 – Watson	5 – Korngable	Sanford Coyote Sports Center (1,845); Vermillion, SD
January 22, 2022; 1:00 pm, MIDCO / ESPN+		St. Thomas	W 70–43	16–4 (9–0)	19 – Lamb	7 – Tied	4 – Tied	Sanford Coyote Sports Center (2,015); Vermillion, SD
January 27, 2022; 7:00 pm, WDAY Xtra / ESPN+		at North Dakota State	W 78–59	17–4 (10–0)	21 – Lamb	8 – Sjerven	6 – Lamb	Scheels Center (402); Fargo, ND
January 29, 2022; 1:00 pm, MIDCO / ESPN+		at North Dakota	W 88–72	18–4 (11–0)	30 – Sjerven	8 – Watson	5 – Tied	Betty Engelstad Sioux Center (1,561); Grand Forks, ND
February 5, 2022; 2:00 pm, MIDCO / ESPN+		at South Dakota State	L 65–75	18–5 (11–1)	21 – Sjerven	16 – Sjerven	4 – Korngable	Frost Arena (3,549); Brookings, SD
February 10, 2022; 7:00 pm, MIDCO / ESPN+		Omaha	W 61–35	19–5 (12–1)	11 – Lamb	8 – Sjerven	5 – Tied	Sanford Coyote Sports Center (1,803); Vermillion, SD
February 12, 2022; 1:00 pm, MIDCO 2 / ESPN3		Denver	W 81–53	20–5 (13–1)	15 – Tied	12 – Sjerven	5 – Tied	Sanford Coyote Sports Center (2,142); Vermillion, SD
February 17, 2022; 7:00 pm		at St. Thomas	W 73–46	21–5 (14–1)	26 – Sjerven	8 – Tied	3 – Tied	Schoenecker Arena (490); St. Paul, MN
February 19, 2022; ESPN3		Western Illinois	Postponed due to COVID-19 protocols within the Western Illinois program.					Western Hall; Macomb, IL
February 24, 2022; 7:00 pm		Kansas City	W 71–49	22–5 (15–1)	22 – Sjerven	9 – Sjerven	4 – Lamb	Sanford Coyote Sports Center (1,913); Vermillion, SD
February 26, 2022; 1:00 pm		Oral Roberts; Senior Day	W 78–49	23–5 (16–1)	18 – Watson	5 – Tied	4 – Larkins	Sanford Coyote Sports Center (2,463); Vermillion, SD
February 28, 2022; 6:00 pm		at Western Illinois	W 75–48	24–5 (17–1)	23 – Lamb	14 – Sjerven	4 – Korngable	Western Hall; Macomb, IL
Summit League
March 5, 2022; 3:00 pm, MidcoSN/ESPN+	(2)	vs. (7) Western Illinois; Quarterfinals	W 75–49	25–5	23 – Larkins	8 – Sjerven	4 – Korngable	Denny Sanford Premier Center (8,075); Sioux Falls, SD
March 7, 2022; 3:00 pm, MidcoSN/ESPN+	(2)	vs. (3) Kansas City; Semifinals	W 81–67	26–5	33 – Lamb	9 – Sjerven	5 – Korngable	Denny Sanford Premier Center (6,518); Sioux Falls, SD
March 8, 2022; 1:00 pm, ESPNU	(2)	vs. (1) South Dakota State; Championship	W 56–45	27–5	19 – Sjerven	10 – Sjerven	3 – Tied	Denny Sanford Premier Center (8,117); Sioux Falls, SD
NCAA tournament
March 18, 2022; 12:30 pm, ESPN2	(10 W)	vs. (7 W) Ole Miss; First Round	W 75–61	28–5	20 – Tied	7 – Sjerven	7 – Korngable	Ferrell Center; Waco, TX
March 20, 2022; 5:00 pm, ESPN2	(10 W)	vs. (2 W) No. 7 Baylor; Second Round	W 61–47	29–5	16 – Sjerven	7 – Krull	5 – Korngable	Ferrell Center (3,684); Waco, TX
March 26, 2022; 5:30 pm, ESPN2	(10 W)	vs. (3 W) No. 12 Michigan; Sweet 16	L 49–52	29–6	17 – Sjerven	8 – Sjerven	4 – Tied	Intrust Bank Arena (4,695); Wichita, KS
*Non-conference game. ^{#}Rankings from AP Poll. (#) Tournament seedings in parentheses. W=Wichita. All times are in Central Time. "2021–22 Schedule & Results". University of South Dakota Athletics.

== Rankings ==
2021–22 NCAA Division I women's basketball rankings

+ Regular season polls	Poll	Pre- Season	Week 2	Week 3	Week 4	Week 5	Week 6	Week 7	Week 8	Week 9	Week 10	Week 11	Week 12	Week 13	Week 14	Week 15	Week 16	Week 17	Week 18	Week 19	Final
AP	(RV)										(RV)										
Coaches	(RV)										(RV)	(RV)		(RV)	(RV)	(RV)	(RV)	(RV)	(RV)	#24	

Legend
	Increase in ranking
	Decrease in ranking
	Not ranked previous week
(RV)	Received Votes
(NR)	Not Ranked
