= Todd Hafner =

American football coach (born c. 1971)

Current position
- Title: Head coach
- Team: Carl Junction HS (MO)
- Record: 18–35

Biographical details
- Born: c. 1971 (age 54–55); Oskaloosa, Kansas, U.S.
- Education: Pittsburg State University (1994)

Playing career
- 1990: Pittsburg State
- Position: Quarterback

Coaching career (HC unless noted)
- 1991–1993: Pittsburg State (SA)
- 1994–1995: Carl Junction HS (MO) (assistant)
- 1996: Southwest Baptist (GA)
- 1997–2000: Carl Junction HS (MO)
- 2001–2002: Emporia State (OC)
- 2003: Emporia State (AHC/OC)
- 2004–2022: William Penn
- 2023–present: Carl Junction HS (MO)

Head coaching record
- Overall: 113–94–1 (college); 18–35 (high school)

Accomplishments and honors

Championships
- 2 MSFA Midwest League (2010, 2012); 1 HAAC North Division (2016)

Todd Hafner (born c. 1971) is an American college football coach. He is the head football coach for Carl Junction High School in Missouri, a position he has held since 2023 and also from 1997 to 2000. He was the head football coach for William Penn University from 2004 to 2022. He also coached for Pittsburg State, Southwest Baptist, and Emporia State. He played college football for Pittsburg State as a quarterback.

== Head coaching record ==
=== College ===
| Year | Team | Overall | Conference | Standing | Bowl/playoffs | NAIA Coaches'^{#} |
|---|---|---|---|---|---|---|
William Penn Statesmen (Mid-States Football Association) (2004–2014)
| 2004 | William Penn | 3–8 | 2–5 | 6th (Midwest) | | |
| 2005 | William Penn | 6–5 | 4–3 | 4th (Midwest) | | |
| 2006 | William Penn | 5–6 | 5–3 | T–3rd (Midwest) | | |
| 2007 | William Penn | 5–6 | 3–4 | T–5th (Midwest) | | |
| 2008 | William Penn | 7–4 | 5–2 | T–2nd (Midwest) | | |
| 2009 | William Penn | 7–5 | 5–2 | 3rd (Midwest) | | |
| 2010 | William Penn | 10–1 | 6–1 | T–1st (Midwest) | | 12 |
| 2011 | William Penn | 9–2 | 5–2 | T–3rd (Midwest) | | 15 |
| 2012 | William Penn | 9–3 | 5–1 | T–1st (Midwest) | | 15 |
| 2013 | William Penn | 5–6 | 3–3 | 4th (Midwest) | | |
| 2014 | William Penn | 7–4 | 3–2 | 3rd (Midwest) | | 19 |
William Penn Statesmen (Heart of America Athletic Conference) (2015–2022)
| 2015 | William Penn | 7–4 | 3–2 | T–2nd (North) | | 25 |
| 2016 | William Penn | 7–4 | 4–1 | T–1st (North) | | 25 |
| 2017 | William Penn | 7–4 | 3–2 | T–3rd (North) | | |
| 2019 | William Penn | 4–6–1 | 2–3 | T–3rd (North) | | |
| 2020–21 | William Penn | 4–3 | 2–1 | 3rd (North) | | |
| 2022 | William Penn | 3–7 | 1–4 | 5th (North) | | |
| William Penn: | | 113–94–1 | 65–47 | | | |
| Total: | | 113–94–1 | | | | |
National championship Conference title Conference division title or championship game berth

=== High school ===
| Year | Team | Overall | Conference | Standing | Bowl/playoffs |
|---|---|---|---|---|---|
Carl Junction Bulldogs () (1997–2000)
| Carl Junction: | | 15–26 | | | |
Carl Junction Bulldogs () (2023–present)
| 2023 | Carl Junction | 3–9 | 1–8 | T–8th | |
| Carl Junction: | | 18–35 | 1–8 | | |
| Total: | | 18–35 | | | |
