= Candi Whitaker =

American college basketball coach (born 1980)

Current position
- Title: Head coach
- Team: Kansas City
- Conference: Summit League
- Record: 77–93 (.453)

Biographical details
- Born: April 22, 1980 (age 46); Canyon, Texas, U.S.

Playing career
- 1998–2000: Seward County CC
- 2000–2002: Texas Tech
- Position: Point guard

Coaching career (HC unless noted)
- 2002–2004: Valparaiso (asst.)
- 2004–2006: UMKC (asst.)
- 2006–2012: UMKC
- 2012–2013: Oklahoma State (assoc.)
- 2013–2018: Texas Tech
- 2019–2024: Missouri Western State
- 2024–2026: North Alabama
- 2026–present: Kansas City

Head coaching record
- Overall: 231–222 (.510)

Candace Elizabeth Whitaker (née White; born April 22, 1980) is an American college basketball coach who is currently in her second stint as the head coach at UMKC. Previously, Whitaker was head coach at North Alabama, Texas Tech, and Missouri Western State University. After playing college basketball at Texas Tech, Whitaker returned to her alma mater to fill the position after former coach Kristy Curry left to coach at Alabama.

== Coaching career ==
=== Kansas City (UMKC, 2004–12) ===
In the middle of the 2006-07 season, Whitaker was named the eighth coach in Kansas City Roos' history, replacing Bo Overton. She coached her first game in the Roos' conference opener, a 51-to-48 victory over Chicago State. She coached at Kansas City until the end of the 2011-12 year, compiling an overall record of 41-65. In her time at Kansas City, Whitaker led the Roos to two separate fourth-place Summit League finishes, in 2009-10 and 2011-12.

=== Texas Tech University ===
Following Kristy Curry's departure from Alabama on May 11, 2013, Whitaker was named the new head coach at Texas Tech University on May 20, 2013. On January 1, 2018, Texas Tech fired Whitaker.

=== Missouri Western State University ===
In April 2019, it was announced that Whitaker was selected as the new head women's basketball coach at Missouri Western State University. She led Missouri Western to the 2022 NCAA Division II Elite Eight. Whitaker was also named 2024 MIAA Coach of the Year.

=== University of North Alabama ===
In March 2024, Whitaker was announced as the head coach at North Alabama.

=== Kansas City (UMKC, 2026–) ===
On March 11, 2026 Whitaker was announced as the head coach at UMKC.

== Head coaching record ==
Record table
Season	Team	Overall	Conference	Standing	Postseason
UMKC Kangaroos (Mid-Continent Conference/Summit League) (2006–2012)
2006–07	UMKC*	8–11**	5–8**	T-5th	
2007–08	UMKC	7–20**	0–15**	9th	
2008–09	UMKC	11–18**	6–11**	T-6th	
2009–10	UMKC	16–16	12–6	5th	WBI First Round
2010–11	UMKC	14–16	9–9	6th	
2011–12	UMKC	22–12	11–7	3rd	WNIT First Round
Texas Tech Lady Raiders (Big 12 Conference) (2013–2018)
2013–14	Texas Tech	6–24	0–18	10th	
2014–15	Texas Tech	15–16	5–13	10th	
2015–16	Texas Tech	13–18	3–15	9th	
2016–17	Texas Tech	14–17	5–13	8th	
2017–18	Texas Tech	6–7***	0–2***		
Texas Tech:		54–82 (.397)	13–61 (.176)		
Missouri Western Griffons (Mid-America Intercollegiate Athletics Association) (2019–2024)
2019–20	Missouri Western	21–8	13–6	4th	Tournament canceled due to COVID-19
2020–21	Missouri Western	6–16	6–16	T-10th	
2021–22	Missouri Western	24–10	14–8	5th	NCAA Division II Elite Eight
2022–23	Missouri Western	24–7	18–4	3rd	
2023–24	Missouri Western	25–6	19–3	1st	NCAA Division II First Round
Missouri Western:		100–47 (.680)	70–37 (.654)		
North Alabama Lions (ASUN) (2024–2026)
2024–25	North Alabama	13–17	8–10	T-6th	
2025–26	North Alabama	17–14	11–7	T-5th	
North Alabama:		30–31 (.492)	19–17 (.528)		
Kansas City Roos (Summit League) (2026–present)
2026-27	Kansas City	0–0	0–0		
UMKC/Kansas City:		77–93 (.453)**	43–56 (.434)**		
Total:		261–253 (.508)			
National champion Postseason invitational champion Conference regular season champion Conference regular season and conference tournament champion Division regular season champion Division regular season and conference tournament champion Conference tournament champion

* Whitaker became interim head coach in December 2006 following the resignation of Bo Overton.

** Reflects 6 games (including 5 conference games) from 2007 to 2009 vacated due to league sanctions.

*** On January 1, 2018, Texas Tech fired Whitaker.

== Personal life ==
Whitaker married her husband Matt Whitaker in April 2007. They have three sons: Westin, William, and Callahan.
