= Carrie Eighmey =

American basketball coach

Current position
- Title: Head coach
- Team: South Dakota
- Conference: Summit League
- Record: 37–29 (.561)

Playing career
- 2000–2004: Hastings
- Position: Point guard

Coaching career (HC unless noted)
- 2004–2008: Hastings (assistant)
- 2008–2012: Fort Hays State (assistant)
- 2012–2015: Hastings
- 2015–2023: Nebraska–Kearney
- 2023–2024: Idaho
- 2024–present: South Dakota

Head coaching record
- Overall: 284–149 (.656)

Accomplishments and honors

Championships
- MIAA regular season (2023); GPAC regular season (2014)

Carrie Eighmey (née Hofstetter) is an American basketball coach and former player who is the current head coach of the South Dakota Coyotes women's basketball team. She was also previously the head coach at the University of Idaho, The University of Nebraska-Kearney, and her alma mater, Hastings College.

== Early life and education ==
Eighmey grew up in Edgar, Nebraska and went to Sandy Creek High School. While at Sandy Creek, Eighmey was part of a Cougar program that had a 95-game winning streak from 1997 to 2000, and won four straight NSAA C-1 girls basketball titles. She was recruited to play at Hastings College, winning the 2002 and 2003 NAIA National Championships with Hastings College under Tony Hobson.

== Coaching career ==
=== Hastings College & Fort Hays State (assistant) ===
After she graduated from Hastings College in 2004, Eighmey would serve as an assistant coach with Hobson, winning a third NAIA Championship in 2006. When Hobson took over at NCAA Division II school Fort Hays State University in 2008, Eighmey followed and was an assistant coach for four seasons.

=== Hastings College (Head Coach) ===
Eighmey would return to her alma mater when Hastings College named Eighmey as their head coach on June 18, 2012. During her three seasons with the Broncos she had two NAIA Tournament appearances and won the 2013-14 Great Plains Athletic Conference regular season title.

=== Nebraska-Kearney ===
Eighmey was named the seventh head coach of the University of Nebraska at Kearney program on March 30, 2015. During her eight years at UNK, the Lopers won the MIAA Conference Tournament in the 2020–21 season, and won the MIAA Regular Season Championship in the 2022–23 season. The Lopers also had three tournament appearances during her tenure.

==== Individual Accolades ====
Eighmey won the 2020-21 NCAA Division II Coach of the Year honor from the online publication World Exposure Report, and was a finalist for the WBCA Division II Coach of the Year honor in the 2022–23 season, which ultimately went to Kari Pickens of Ashland.

=== Idaho ===
After eight seasons at UNK, Eighmey left the Lopers for her first Division I job with the Idaho Vandals. After one season where the Vandals season ended in the Big Sky Quarterfinals, Eighmey resigned to become the next head coach at South Dakota. Idaho's administration was criticized after Eighmey did not have to pay any buyout to Idaho, because she did not sign the contract. Arthur Moreira, who Eighmey hired as her associate head coach, was elevated to the head coaching position after her departure.

=== South Dakota ===
On April 30, 2024, Eighmey was hired as head women's basketball coach at the University of South Dakota. After her first season, where the Coyotes finished eight games below .500, Eighmey and her staff had a 15-game turnaround and finished in the Summit League tournament semifinals. The Coyotes qualified for the WNIT in the 2025-26 season, defeating Northern Colorado, Pepperdine, and Montana State; before falling to Illinois State in the Fab 4.

== Head coaching record ==
Record table
Season	Team	Overall	Conference	Standing	Postseason
Hastings Broncos (Great Plains Athletic Conference) (2012–2015)
2012–13	Hastings	15–16	10–10	T–6th	
2013–14	Hastings	28–6	16–4	T–1st	NAIA Division II Quarterfinals
2014–15	Hastings	25–9	15–5	3rd	NAIA Division II Semifinals
Hastings:		68–31 (.687)	41–9 (.820)		
Nebraska–Kearney Lopers (Mid-America Intercollegiate Athletics Association) (2015–2023)
2015–16	Nebraska–Kearney	16–14	11–11	T–6th	
2016–17	Nebraska–Kearney	12–16	8–11	8th	
2017–18	Nebraska–Kearney	21–7	13–6	T–4th	
2018–19	Nebraska–Kearney	15–14	8–11	T–8th	
2019–20	Nebraska–Kearney	26–6	14–5	3rd	
2020–21	Nebraska–Kearney	22–3	19–3	T–2nd	NCAA Division II Sweet Sixteen
2021–22	Nebraska–Kearney	24–8	13–5	3rd	NCAA Division II Second Round
2022–23	Nebraska–Kearney	28–5	20–2	1st	NCAA Division II First Round
Nebraska–Kearney:		164–73 (.692)	106–54 (.663)		
Idaho Vandals (Big Sky) (2023–2024)
2023–24	Idaho	15–16	8–10	6th	
Idaho:		15–16 (.484)	8–10 (.444)		
South Dakota Coyotes (Summit League) (2024–present)
2024–25	South Dakota	11–19	5–11	T–7th	
2025–26	South Dakota	26–10	12–4	3rd	WNIT Fab 4
South Dakota:		37–29 (.561)	17–15 (.531)		
Total:		284–149 (.656)			
National champion Postseason invitational champion Conference regular season champion Conference regular season and conference tournament champion Division regular season champion Division regular season and conference tournament champion Conference tournament champion
