= Doshia Woods =

American basketball coach and player

Biographical details
- Education: Barton CC; Western Illinois

Playing career
- 1997–1999: Barton
- 1999–2001: Western Illinois
- Position: Guard

Coaching career (HC unless noted)
- 2001–2004: Western Illinois (asst.)
- 2004–2005: New Mexico State (asst.)
- 2005–2008: Oregon State (asst.)
- 2008–2010: Missouri (asst.)
- 2010–2020: Tulane (asst.)
- 2020–2026: Denver
- 2026–: Toledo (asst.)

Head coaching record
- Overall: 57–116 (.329)

Doshia Woods is an American basketball coach and former player who was recently the head coach of the Denver Pioneers women's basketball team.

== Coaching career ==
Woods started her coaching career at Western Illinois University, where she served as an assistant coach on the women's basketball team from 2001 until 2004.

Woods was hired on July 21, 2020 as the 11th head coach in University of Denver women's basketball program history. The university and Woods parted ways after her sixth season, on March 10, 2026.

== Head Coaching Record ==
Record table
Season	Team	Overall	Conference	Standing	Postseason
Denver Pioneers women's basketball (Summit League) (2020–2026)
2020–21	Denver	7-16	5-9	7th	
2021–22	Denver	10-20	5-13	8th	
2022–23	Denver	12-18	8-10	6th	
2023–24	Denver	8-22	5-11	7th	
2024–25	Denver	9-21	2-14	9th	
2025–26	Denver	11-19	5-11	6th	
Denver:		57–116 (.329)	30–68 (.306)		
Total:		57–116 (.329)			
National champion Postseason invitational champion Conference regular season champion Conference regular season and conference tournament champion Division regular season champion Division regular season and conference tournament champion Conference tournament champion
