= J. D. Gravina =

American basketball coach

Current position
- Title: Head coach
- Team: Western Illinois
- Conference: Ohio Valley Conference
- Record: 241–216 (.527)

Biographical details
- Education: William Jewell College (2000); University of Missouri–Kansas City (2002); Emporia State University (2007)

Coaching career (HC unless noted)
- 2005–2007: McPherson College
- 2007–2011: Quincy University
- 2011–present: Western Illinois

Head coaching record
- Overall: 355–277 (.562)
- Tournaments: 0–2 (NCAA D1); 3–3 (NCAA D2); 1–1 (WBI); 1–2 (WNIT)

Accomplishments and honors

Awards
- 3× Illinois Basketball Coach Association Coach of the Year (2008, 2009, 2011); 2× Great Lakes Valley Conference Coach of the Year (2008, 2009); Summit League Coach of the Year (2017); OVC Coach of the Year (2026)

J. D. Gravina is an American college basketball coach and the coach of the Western Illinois women's basketball team.

== Western Illinois ==
Gravina was hired at Western Illinois on April 15, 2011. He led the Leathernecks to their highest single season win total in program history with 26 wins. He also brought the Leathernecks their first Summit League regular season and Summit League Tournament title. Gravina took Western Illinois to their first NCAA tournament since 1995.

Gravina is second in program history in wins and winning percentage, behind Leslie Crane (his predecessor) and Bea Yeager (first coach in program history).

== Head coaching record ==
Record table
Season	Team	Overall	Conference	Standing	Postseason
McPherson College (Kansas Collegiate Athletic Conference) (2005–2007)
2005–06	McPherson College	7–20	4–14		
2006–07	McPherson College	14–13	8–10		
McPherson:		21–33 (.389)	12–24 (.333)		
Quincy University (Great Lakes Valley Conference) (2007–2011)
2007–08	Quincy University	20–10	14–5	3rd	NCAA DII Second Round
2008–09	Quincy University	27–5	16–1	1st	NCAA DII Second Round
2009–10	Quincy University	20–9	10–8	7th	
2010–11	Quincy University	26–4	16–2	1st	NCAA DII Second Round
Quincy University:		93–28 (.769)	56–16 (.778)		
Western Illinois (Summit League) (2011–2023)
2011–12	Western Illinois	12–19	7–11	T-6th	
2012–13	Western Illinois	14–16	7–9	T-5th	
2013–14	Western Illinois	14–16	6–8	5th	
2014–15	Western Illinois	17–13	9–7	T-3rd	
2015–16	Western Illinois	16–16	8–8	5th	WBI Second Round
2016–17	Western Illinois	26–7	13–3	1st	NCAA DI First Round
2017–18	Western Illinois	22–10	10–4	3rd	WNIT First Round
2018–19	Western Illinois	12–18	8–8	5th	
2019–20	Western Illinois	15–15	9–7	T–3rd	
2020–21	Western Illinois	8–16	6–8	5th	
2021–22	Western Illinois	14–15	5–12	7th	
2022–23	Western Illinois	10–20	5–13	9th	
Western Illinois (Ohio Valley Conference) (2023–present)
2023–24	Western Illinois	18–12	9–9	7th	
2024–25	Western Illinois	17–18	8–12	7th	WNIT Second Round
2025–26	Western Illinois	26–6	16–4	T–1st	NCAA DI First Round
2026–27	Western Illinois	0–0	0–0		
Western Illinois:		241–216 (.527)	120–104 (.536)		
Total:		355–277 (.563)			
National champion Postseason invitational champion Conference regular season champion Conference regular season and conference tournament champion Division regular season champion Division regular season and conference tournament champion Conference tournament champion
