= 2013 Summit League women's basketball tournament =

- Classification: Division I
- Season: 2012–13
- Teams: 8
- Site: Sioux Falls Arena; Sioux Falls, South Dakota
- Champions: South Dakota State (5 title)
- Winning coach: Aaron Johnston (5 title)
- MVP: Nicole Seekamp (South Dakota)
- Attendance: 21,158
- Television: FSN North, ESPNU (Championship Game)

2012–13 Summit League women's basketball standings
| | Conf. | | | | Overall |
| Team | W | | L | PCT | W | | L | PCT |
|---|---|---|---|---|---|---|---|---|
| South Dakota State † | 14 | – | 2 | .875 | 25 | – | 8 | .758 |
| IUPUI | 12 | – | 4 | .750 | 20 | – | 12 | .625 |
| South Dakota | 10 | – | 6 | .625 | 19 | – | 15 | .559 |
| Fort Wayne | 8 | – | 8 | .500 | 13 | – | 17 | .433 |
| Omaha | 7 | – | 9 | .438 | 17 | – | 11 | .607 |
| Western Illinois | 7 | – | 9 | .438 | 14 | – | 16 | .467 |
| North Dakota State | 6 | – | 10 | .375 | 10 | – | 19 | .345 |
| Kansas City | 5 | – | 11 | .313 | 9 | – | 21 | .300 |
| Oakland | 3 | – | 13 | .188 | 9 | – | 20 | .310 |
† 2013 Summit League tournament winner As of March 23, 2013; Rankings from AP Poll

The 2013 Summit League women's basketball championship was held at the Sioux Falls Arena in Sioux Falls, South Dakota, from 9 March until 12 March. The tournament was won by South Dakota State, who defeated South Dakota in the championship game.

== Bracket ==
Quarterfinals; March 9, 10
1 | South Dakota State | 67
8 | Oakland | 53
4 | Fort Wayne | 106**
5 | Western Illinois | 102**
2 | IUPUI | 59
7 | Kansas City | 47
3 | South Dakota | 73
6 | North Dakota State | 53

Semifinals; March 11
1 | South Dakota State | 86
4 | Fort Wayne | 59
2 | IUPUI | 72
3 | South Dakota | 82

Championship; March 12
1 | South Dakota State | 56
3 | South Dakota | 53

All Times Central
** – Denotes double overtime

== Player honors ==
Most Outstanding Player - Nicole Seekamp (South Dakota)
All-Tournament Team - Gabby Boever, South Dakota State; Ashley Eide, South Dakota State; Kerah Nelson, IUPUI; Nicole Seekamp, South Dakota (MVP); Tempestt Wilson, South Dakota.

== See also ==
- 2013 The Summit League men's basketball tournament
