= 2021–22 South Dakota State Jackrabbits women's basketball team =

Intercollegiate basketball season

2021–22 South Dakota State Jackrabbits women's basketball

Summit League regular season co-champions

2022 WNIT champions
- Conference: Summit League
- Record: 29–9 (17–1 The Summit)
- Head coach: Aaron Johnston (22nd full, 23rd overall season)
- Assistant coaches: Carissa Thielbar; Megan Lueck; Sadie Thramer
- Home arena: Frost Arena

2021–22 Summit League women's basketball standings
	Conf.				Overall
Team	W		L	PCT	W		L	PCT
South Dakota State	17	–	1	.944	29	–	9	.763
South Dakota †	17	–	1	.944	29	–	6	.829
Kansas City	12	–	6	.667	23	–	9	.719
Oral Roberts	10	–	8	.556	16	–	15	.516
North Dakota	9	–	9	.500	15	–	15	.500
North Dakota State	7	–	11	.389	11	–	18	.379
Western Illinois	5	–	12	.294	14	–	15	.483
Denver	5	–	13	.278	10	–	20	.333
St. Thomas*	4	–	14	.222	7	–	21	.250
Omaha	3	–	14	.176	7	–	19	.269
† 2022 Summit League tournament winner * Ineligible for the 2022 NCAA tournament due to transition from Division III

The 2021–22 South Dakota State Jackrabbits women's basketball team represented South Dakota State University in the 2021–22 NCAA Division I women's basketball season. The Jackrabbits, led by 22nd-year head coach Aaron Johnston, competed in the Summit League. They played their home games in Frost Arena in Brookings, South Dakota.

== Previous season ==
The Jackrabbits went 21–4 overall and 14–0 in conference play, finishing first in the Summit League.

South Dakota State lost in the quarterfinals in an upset to #8 seed Omaha, but still qualified for the 2021 NCAA Division I women's basketball tournament as an at-large bid.

In the 2021 NCAA tournament, the Jacks received a nine seed in the River Walk Regional and played Syracuse, to whom they lost 55–72.

=== Departures ===
Name	Number	Pos.	Height	Year	Hometown	Reason for departure
Emily Herzberg	4	G	6'0"	Freshman	Melrose, WI	Transferred to Minnesota State

=== Additions ===
Name	Number	Pos.	Height	Year	Hometown	Notes
Paige Meyer	2	G	5'6"	Freshman	Albany, MN	Signed for the 2021–22 season
Haleigh Timmer	13	G	5'11"	Freshman	Rapid City, SD	Signed for the 2021–22 season

== Roster ==
2021–22 South Dakota State Jackrabbits women's basketball team
Players
Coaches

Pos.	#	Name	Height	Year	Previous school	Hometown
G	2	Paige Meyer	5 ft 6 in (1.68 m)	Fr	Albany HS	Albany, MN
G	3	Lindsey Theuninck	5 ft 7 in (1.7 m)	RS Jr	Mankato Loyola	Mankato, MN
G	10	Lauren Rongisch	5 ft 7 in (1.7 m)	RS Sr	Millard West HS	Omaha, NE
G	11	Haley Greer	5 ft 10 in (1.78 m)	GS	New Trier HS; Colgate	Winnetka, IL
F	12	Kallie Theisen	6 ft 1 in (1.85 m)	So	Wayzata High School	Plymouth, MN
G	13	Haleigh Timmer	5 ft 11 in (1.8 m)	Fr	St. Thomas More High School	Rapid City, SD
F	20	Tori Nelson	6 ft 1 in (1.85 m)	So	Henry Sibley High School	Mendota Heights, MN
G	21	Tylee Irwin	6 ft 0 in (1.83 m)	Sr	Wahpeton	Wahpeton, ND
F	22	Madysen Vlastuin	6 ft 1 in (1.85 m)	Fr	Lennox HS	Lennox, SD
F	24	Mesa Byom	6 ft 2 in (1.88 m)	Fr	Melrose-Mindoro HS	Melrose, WI
F	33	Paiton Burckhard	6 ft 0 in (1.83 m)	Jr	Central HS	Aberdeen, SD
F	42	Regan Nesheim	6 ft 1 in (1.85 m)	RS So	Johnston High School	Johnston, IA
G/F	44	Myah Selland	6 ft 1 in (1.85 m)	RS Jr	Sanborn Central/Woonsocket HS	Letcher, SD
C	52	Addison Hirschman	6 ft 2 in (1.88 m)	Sr	Kingsley-Pierson HS	Kingsley, IA

Head coach

- Aaron Johnston (Gustavus Adolphus)

Assistant coach(es)

- Carissa Thielbar (UW–Superior)
- Megan Lueck (Minnesota Duluth)
- Sadie Thramer (Wayne State (MI))

Legend

- (C) Team captain
- (S) Suspended
- (I) Ineligible
- (W) Walk-on
- Injured
- Current redshirt

Roster
Last update: June 22, 2024

== Schedule ==
Date time, TV	Rank^{#}	Opponent^{#}	Result	Record	Site (attendance) city, state
Exhibition
October 27, 2021*; 7:00 p.m.		St. Cloud State	W 60–45	0–0	Frost Arena; Brookings, SD
November 4, 2021*; 7:00 p.m.		Concordia-St. Paul	W 71–46	0–0	Frost Arena; Brookings, SD
Non-conference regular season
November 9, 2021*; 6:00 p.m., MIDCOSN		Green Bay	W 70–49	1–0	Frost Arena (1,652); Brookings, SD
November 12, 2021*; 6:00 p.m., SECN+		at Mississippi State	L 71–76	1–1	Humphrey Coliseum (4,720); Starkville, MS
November 15, 2021*; 6:30 p.m., ESPN+/Big12		at No. 14 Iowa State	L 56–75	1–2	Hilton Coliseum; Ames, IA
November 18, 2021*; 6:00 p.m., MIDCOSN		Montana State	W 78–49	2–2	Frost Arena (1,262); Brookings, SD
November 21, 2021*; 7:00 p.m.		at Creighton	L 55–67	2–3	D. J. Sokol Arena (864); Omaha, NE
November 26, 2021*; 10:00 a.m., Flo Hoops		vs. UMass; Gulf Coast Showcase first round	L 63–81	2–4	Hertz Arena (143); Estero, FL
November 27, 2021*; 10:00 a.m., Flo Hoops		vs. No. 19 UCLA; Gulf Coast Showcase consolation	W 76–66	3–4	Hertz Arena (213); Estero, FL
November 28, 2021*; 1:30 p.m., Flo Sports		vs. Charlotte; Gulf Coast Showcase 5th-place game	Canceled		Hertz Arena; Estero, FL
December 4, 2021*; 2:00 p.m., ESPN+		at Northern Iowa	L 50–59	3–5	McLeod Center (636); Cedar Falls, IA
December 6, 2021*; 7:00 p.m., MIDCOSN 2		Missouri State	L 52–55	3–6	Frost Arena (1,149); Brookings, SD
December 11, 2021*; 2:00 p.m., MIDCOSN		Kansas State	L 73–79	3–7	Frost Arena (768); Brookings, SD
December 15, 2021*; 7:00 p.m.		Dakota Wesleyan	W 90–43	4–7	Frost Arena (612); Brookings, SD
Summit League regular season
December 20, 2021; 6:00 p.m.		at Kansas City	W 85–78	5–7 (1–0)	Municipal Auditorium (767); Kansas City, MO
December 22, 2021; 5:00 p.m.		at Oral Roberts	W 71–51	6–7 (2–0)	Mabee Center (1,468); Tulsa, OK
December 30, 2021; 5:00 p.m., MIDCOSN 2		North Dakota State	W 77–60	7–7 (3–0)	Frost Arena (1,563); Brookings, SD
January 1, 2022; 2:00 p.m., MIDCOSN		North Dakota	W 72–54	8–7 (4–0)	Frost Arena (1,230); Brookings, SD
January 8, 2022; 1:00 p.m., MIDCOSN		at South Dakota	L 42–65	8–8 (4–1)	Sanford Coyote Sports Center (3,513); Vermillion, SD
January 13, 2022; 5:00 p.m.		at Omaha	W 72–49	9–8 (5–1)	Baxter Arena; Omaha, NE
January 15, 2022; 3:00 p.m.		at Denver	W 87–43	10–8 (6–1)	Hamilton Gymnasium (191); Denver, CO
January 20, 2022; 7:00 p.m., MIDCOSN 2		St. Thomas #BEATTYPE1	W 88–47	11–8 (7–1)	Frost Arena (1,220); Brookings, SD
January 22, 2022; 2:00 p.m., ESPN+		Western Illinois	W 114–50	12–8 (8–1)	Frost Arena (1,506); Brookings, SD
January 27, 2022; 7:00 p.m., MIDCOSN 2		at North Dakota	W 75–49	13–8 (9–1)	Betty Engelstad Sioux Center (1,287); Grand Forks, ND
January 29, 2022; 7:00 p.m., ESPN+		at North Dakota State	W 76–60	14–8 (10–1)	Scheels Center (841); Fargo, ND
February 5, 2022; 2:00 p.m., ESPN+		South Dakota; South Dakota Showdown Series	W 75–65	15–8 (11–1)	Frost Arena (3,549); Brookings, SD
February 10, 2022; 7:00 p.m., ESPN+		Denver; Pink Game	W 79–52	16–8 (12–1)	Frost Arena (1,643); Brookings, SD
February 12, 2022; 2:00 p.m., ESPN3		Omaha; Pork Classic	W 77–62	17–8 (13–1)	Frost Arena (3,128); Brookings, SD
February 17, 2022; 6:00 p.m., ESPN+		at Western Illinois	W 84–54	18–8 (14–1)	Western Hall; Macomb, IL
February 19, 2022; 1:00 p.m., ESPN+		at St. Thomas	W 83–42	19–8 (15–1)	Schoenecker Arena; Saint Paul, MN
February 24, 2022; 7:00 p.m., ESPN+		Oral Roberts	W 84–48	20–8 (16–1)	Frost Arena (1,363); Brookings, SD
February 26, 2022; 2:00 p.m.		Kansas City; Senior Day	W 94–62	21–8 (17–1)	Frost Arena (2,059); Brookings, SD
Summit League women's tournament (2–1)
March 5, 2022; 12:30 p.m., MIDCO/ESPN+	(1)	vs. (8) Denver; Quarterfinals	W 86–59	22–8	Denny Sanford Premier Center (8,075); Sioux Falls, SD
March 6, 2022; 12:30 p.m., MIDCO/ESPN+	(1)	vs. (4) Oral Roberts; Semifinals	W 72–53	23–8	Denny Sanford Premier Center (6,518); Sioux Falls, SD
March 5, 2022; 1:00 p.m., ESPNU	(1)	vs. (2) South Dakota; Championship	L 45–56	23–9	Denny Sanford Premier Center (8,117); Sioux Falls, SD
National Invitational Tournament (5–0)
March 17, 2022*; 8:00 p.m., MIDCO		Ohio; First round	W 87–57	24–9	Frost Arena (1,774); Brookings, SD
March 20, 2022*; 2:00 p.m., MIDCO		Minnesota; Second round	W 78–57	25–9	Frost Arena (2,678); Brookings, SD
March 24, 2022*; 7:00 p.m., MIDCO		Drake; Third round	W 84–66	26–9	Frost Arena (3,114); Brookings, SD
March 27, 2022*; 5:00 p.m., MIDCO / ESPN3		Alabama; Quarterfinals	W 78–73	27–9	Frost Arena (4,268); Brookings, SD
March 31, 2022*; 7:00 p.m., MIDCO / ESPN3		UCLA; Semifinals	W 62–59	28–9	Frost Arena (5,227); Brookings, SD
April 2, 2022*; 2:00 p.m., CBSSN		Seton Hall; Championship	W 82–50	29–9	Frost Arena (5,263); Brookings, SD
*Non-conference game. ^{#}Rankings from AP poll. (#) Tournament seedings in parentheses. All times are in Central.

== Rankings ==
Regular season polls
Poll	Pre- season	Week 2	Week 3	Week 4	Week 5	Week 6	Week 7	Week 8	Week 9	Week 10	Week 11	Week 12	Week 13	Week 14	Week 15	Week 16	Week 17	Final
AP	RV	NR	NR	NR													RV	
Coaches	RV	*	NR	NR											RV	RV		

Legend
	Increase in ranking
	Decrease in ranking
	Not ranked previous week
(RV)	Received votes
(NR)	Not ranked

== Honors ==
=== Summit League Player of the Week ===
- December 27, 2021 – Paige Meyer
- February 14, 2022 – Myah Selland

=== Postseason awards ===
- Summit League Coach of the Year
  Aaron Johnston
- All-Summit League Team
  Myah Selland, First team
  Paige Meyer, Second team
  Paiton Burckhard, Honorable Mention
  Tylee Irwin, Honorable Mention
  Tori Nelson, Honorable Mention
- Summit League All-Defensive Team
  Tylee Irwin
- Summit League All-Newcomer Team
  Paige Meyer
- WNIT Most Valuable Player
  Myah Selland
- WNIT All-Tournament Team
  Myah Selland
  Haleigh Timmer
