= Hannah Sjerven =

American basketball player (born 1998)

No. 34 – Sydney Flames
- Position: Forward-center
- League: WNBL

Personal information
- Born: June 11, 1998 (age 28) Otsego, Minnesota
- Listed height: 6 ft 3 in (1.91 m)

Career information
- High school: Rogers (Rogers, Minnesota)
- College: New Mexico (2016–2017); South Dakota (2018–2022)
- WNBA draft: 2022: 3rd round, 28th overall pick
- Drafted by: Minnesota Lynx

Career history
- 2022: Minnesota Lynx
- 2022–2023: Sydney Uni Flames

Career highlights
- 3x Summit League Defensive Player of the Year (2020–2022); Summit League Sixth Woman of the Year (2019); 3x First-team All-Summit League (2020–2022); 4x Summit League All-Tournament Team (2019-2022); Summit League Tournament MVP (2020); Summit League All-Newcomer Team (2019); NCAA Wichita All-Region Team (2022)
- Stats at Basketball Reference

Hannah Olive Sjerven (born June 11, 1998) is an American professional basketball player for the Sydney Flames of the Women's National Basketball League (WNBL). She played for the Minnesota Lynx in the Women's National Basketball Association (WNBA). She played college basketball at New Mexico and South Dakota.

== College career ==
Sjerven was rated as the 131st ranked player in the nation in the 2016 recruiting class. Sjerven signed with New Mexico out of high school. Following her first season at New Mexico in 2016–17, when she played 13 games Sjerven announced her transfer to South Dakota.

== Professional career ==
=== Minnesota Lynx ===
On April 11, 2022, Sjerven was drafted 28th overall by the Minnesota Lynx in the 2022 WNBA draft. Sjerven appeared in two preseason games for the Lynx tallying 8 points vs. Las Vegas and had 6 rebounds vs. Washington

On May 3, 2022, Sjerven was waived from the Lynx training camp and did not make the opening day roster. Sjerven returned on May 13, 2022, on a hardship contract On May 22, 2022, Sjerven was released from her hardship contract as Natalie Achonwa returned from injury.

== Career statistics ==
Legend
GP	Games played	GS	Games started	MPG	Minutes per game	RPG	Rebounds per game
APG	Assists per game	SPG	Steals per game	BPG	Blocks per game	PPG	Points per game
TO	Turnovers per game	FG%	Field-goal percentage	3P%	3-point field-goal percentage	FT%	Free-throw percentage
**Bold**	Career best	°	League leader

=== WNBA Regular season ===
Year	Team	GP	GS	MPG	FG%	3P%	FT%	RPG	APG	SPG	BPG	TO	PPG
2022	Minnesota	3	0	3.0	.000	.000	.000	0.0	0.0	0.0	0.3	0.0	0.0
Career	1 year, 1 team	3	0	3.0	.000	.000	.000	0.0	0.0	0.0	0.3	0.0	0.0

=== College ===
Year	Team	GP	GS	MPG	FG%	3P%	FT%	RPG	APG	SPG	BPG	TO	PPG
2016–17	New Mexico	13	0	6.7	55.6	16.7	54.5	1.8	0.1	0.2	0.7	**0.4**	2.8
2017–18	South Dakota	Sat out due to NCAA transfer rules											
2018–19	South Dakota	34	1	18.2	57.0	21.1	66.7	5.9	0.9	1.4	1.9	1.7	11.8
2019–20	South Dakota	32	31	19.9	**58.1**	31.3	68.3	7.3	1.2	1.4	2.0	1.3	12.2
2020–21	South Dakota	25	25	**26.5**	52.2	20.8	**71.3**	**9.8**	**1.7**	**1.6**	**2.2**	1.9	**17.1**
2021–22	South Dakota	**35**	**35**	25.2	52.1	**35.4**	65.9	7.7	1.0	1.5	1.8	1.7	15.1
**Career**		139	92	20.8	54.5	28.3	67.8	7.0	1.1	1.4	1.8	1.5	12.8
Statistics retrieved from Sports-Reference.
