= Carl Junction High School =

Public school in Missouri, United States

Location
- 206 S Roney St; Carl Junction, Missouri 64834; United States; 37°10′40″N 94°34′29″W

Information
- Type: Public Secondary
- Established: 1887 (2000 current building)
- Principal: Keith Robertson
- Staff: 65.70 (FTE)
- Grades: 9–12
- Enrollment: 975 (2023-2024)
- Student to teacher ratio: 14.84
- Colors: Red, and White
- Athletics conference: Ozark Mountain Conference
- Mascot: Bulldog
- Website: cjhs.cjr1.org

Carl Junction High School is a public secondary school in Carl Junction, Missouri, United States.

== Campus ==
The school is equipped with a gymnasium, lunchroom, media center, approximately 56 classrooms, and a multipurpose facility that operates as a storm shelter. A short corridor is used to connect the high school to its neighboring junior high school.

== History of School ==
The school was started in 1887 when a man named Augustus Knight donated some land for the school to be built on. Thus the school was named Knight School House after him. This was the school used up until 1914 when they had too many students for the school. The old school was torn down and a new one was built for the price of $14,000. On the night of March 29, 1928 the school caught fire and burned down. The gymnasium was able to be saved by a student named Lester Johnson. A new school would be built right over the old one that very same year. The student population would grow very quickly. This was mainly to school districts consolidating into the Carl Junction District. They realized they needed more space. In 1960 they built a new high school right next to the old building and used it as a junior high. This system worked and it was used until the year 2000. In this year they built the current high school which was connected to the junior high. They remodeled the old school into the intermediate and made 2 buildings across the street that were used as a K-1.
