= South Dakota Coyotes women's basketball =

South Dakota Coyotes
2025–26 South Dakota Coyotes women's basketball team
- University: University of South Dakota
- Head coach: Carrie Eighmey (2nd season)
- Location: Vermillion, South Dakota
- Arena: Sanford Coyote Sports Center (capacity: 6,000)
- Conference: Summit League
- Nickname: Coyotes
- Colors: Red and white
- All-time record: 890–559 (.614)

NCAA Division I tournament runner-up
- 2008*
Other NCAA Division I tournament results
Final Four	2008*
Elite Eight	2008*
Sweet Sixteen	1984*, 1985*, 2003*, 2008*, 2022
Appearances	1983*, 1984*, 1985*, 1989*, 2003*, 2004*, 2007*, 2008*, 2014, 2019, 2021, 2022

Conference tournament champions
- NCC: 1983, 1984, 1985, 2008; Summit League: 2014, 2020, 2021, 2022

Conference regular-season champions
- NCC: 2003, 2008; Summit League: 2015, 2016, 2018, 2020, 2022

Uniforms
Home	Away
- * at Division II level

The South Dakota Coyotes women's basketball team represents the University of South Dakota in NCAA Division I basketball. They are currently members of the Summit League.

== History ==
As of the end of the 2022–23 season the Coyotes have a 890–559 all-time record, with play beginning in 1971. They won the North Central Conference regular season title in 1983, 1984, 1985, 2003, and finishing their time in NCC with a regular season and conference tournament win in 2008. South Dakota then made the transition from Division II to Division I with stops with the NCAA I Independents and the Great West Conference before settling in the Summit League. The Coyotes in the Summit League have won the regular season five times (2015, 2016, 2018, 2020, 2022) then also have won the Summit League tournament four times (2014, 2020, 2021, 2022). South Dakota made the NCAA tournament 10 times since joining the Division I. The NCAA four times (2014, 2019, 2019, 2022), the WNIT five times (2012, 2015, 2016, 2017, 2018) and the WBI twice (2011 and 2013).

== Head coaches ==
#	Name	Term	Record (W–L)
1	Irene Mehnert	1971–73	16–6 (.727)
2	Jean Jacobsen	1973–76	22–28 (.440)
3	Mary Zimmerman	1976–82	85–64 (.570)
4	Chad Lavin	1982–86, 1998–08	273–139 (.663)
5	Fred Tibbetts	1986–90, 1998	67–53 (.558)
6	Gary Larson	1990–95	67–69 (.493)
7	Lynn Griffin	1995–98	16–58 (.216)
8	Ryun Williams	2008–12	76–47 (.618)
9	Amy Williams	2012–16	96–44 (.686)
10	Dawn Plitzuweit	2016–22	158–36 (.814)
11	Kayla Karius	2022–24	37–29 (.561)
12	Carrie Eighmey	2024–present	37–28 (.569)

== Postseason results ==
=== NCAA Division I tournament results ===
The Coyotes have appeared in four NCAA Tournaments. Their record is 2–4.

Year	Seed	Round	Opponent	Result
2014	#15	First round	#2 Stanford	L 62–81
2019	#8	First round	#9 Clemson	L 66–79
2021	#11	First round	#6 Oregon	L 47–67
2022	#10	First round Second Round; Sweet Sixteen	#7 Ole Miss #2 Baylor #3 Michigan	W 75–61; W 61–47; L 49–52

=== WNIT appearances ===
The Coyotes have appeared in seven WNIT Tournaments. Their record is 17–5.

Year	Round	Opponent	Result
2012	First round Second Sround	Drake; Colorado	W 61–53; L 55–64
2015	First round Second Round	Creighton; Northern Colorado	W 68–58; L 58–59
2016	First round Second Round; Third round Quarterfinals; Semifinals; Championship Game	Creighton; Minnesota; Northern Iowa; Western Kentucky; Oregon; Florida Gulf Coast	W 74–68; W 101–89; W 51–50; W 68–54; W 88–54; W 71–65
2017	First round Second Round	North Dakota; Iowa	W 78–55; L 73–78
2018	First round Second Round; Third round Quarterfinals	Houston; Colorado State; Michigan State; TCU	W 65–58; W 74–49; W 85–83 (OT); L 71–79
2024	First round Second round Super 16	UC Riverside; Northern Arizona; Wyoming	W 72–57; W 79–65; L 52–84
2026	Second round Super 16; Great 8 Fab 4	Northern Colorado; Pepperdine; Montana State; Illinois State	W 80–60; W 73–57; W 65–56; TBD

=== WBI appearances ===
The Coyotes have appeared in 2 WBI Tournaments. Their record is 3–2.

Year	Round	Opponent	Result
2011	First round Quarterfinals	Idaho; Cal State Bakersfield	W 62-47; L 64-90
2013	First round Quarterfinals; Semifinals	Utah State; Lamar; McNeese State	W 77-69; W 71-48; L 63-71

=== NCAA Division II tournament results ===
The Coyotes made eight appearances in the NCAA Division II women's basketball tournament. They had a combined record of 8–8.

Year	Round	Opponent	Result
1983	First round	Texas A&I	L, 71–81
1984	First round Regional Finals	North Dakota; St. Cloud State	W 49–48; L 55–66
1985	Regional Finals	St. Cloud State	L 55–56
1989	First round	North Dakota State	L 71–72 (OT)
2003	First round Regional semifinals Regional Finals	Concordia-St. Paul; North Dakota State; South Dakota State	W 83–68; W 84–61; L 63–87
2004	First round	North Dakota State	L 63–70
2007	First round	Concordia-St. Paul	L 74–82
2008	First round Regional semifinals Regional Finals; Elite Eight; Final Four; National Championship	CSU Pueblo; Nebraska–Kearney; Minnesota State; Washburn; Delta State; Northern Kentucky	W 66–55; W 59–48; W 61–49; W 85–80 (2OT); W 68–58; L 58–63

== Season–by–season results ==
Statistics overview
Season	Coach	Overall	Conference	Standing	Postseason
Irene Mehnert (No Conference) (1971–1973)
1971–72	Irene Mehnert	4–2	—	—	
1972–73	Irene Mehnert	12–4	—	—	
Irene Mehnert:		16–6 (.727)	–		
Jean Jacobsen (No Conference) (1973–1976)
1973–74	Jean Jacobsen	8–8	—	—	
1974–75	Jean Jacobsen	9–7	—	—	
1975–76	Jean Jacobsen	5–13	—	—	
Jean Jacobsen:		22–28 (.440)	–		
Mary Zimmerman (No Conference) (1976–1982)
1976–77	Mary Zimmerman	7–11	—	—	
1977–78	Mary Zimmerman	17–11	—	—	
1978–79	Mary Zimmerman	17–7	—	—	
1979–80	Mary Zimmerman	14–15	—	—	
1980–81	Mary Zimmerman	16–10	—	—	
1981–82	Mary Zimmerman	14–10	—	—	
Mary Zimmerman:		85–64 (.570)	–		
Chad Lavin (North Central Conference) (1982–1986)
1982–83	Chad Lavin	19–9	7—3	1st	NCAA Division II First Round
1983–84	Chad Lavin	22–7	10—2	1st	NCAA Division II Regional Finals
1984–85	Chad Lavin	23–6	11—3	1st	NCAA Division II First Round
1985–86	Chad Lavin	18–10	9—5	3rd	
Chad Lavin (1st stint):		82–32 (.719)	37–13 (.740)		
Fred Tibbetts (North Central Conference) (1986–1990)
1986–87	Fred Tibbetts	14–14	4—10	4th	
1987–88	Fred Tibbetts	13–15	3—11	8th	
1988–89	Fred Tibbetts	22–7	10—4	3rd	NCAA Division II First Round
1989–90	Fred Tibbetts	17–11	8—10	6th	
Fred Tibbetts (1st stint):		66–47 (.584)	25–35 (.417)		
Gary Larson (North Central Conference) (1990–1995)
1990–91	Gary Larson	19–9	11—7	4th	
1991–92	Gary Larson	13–14	6—12	8th	
1992–93	Gary Larson	16–11	9—9	6th	
1993–94	Gary Larson	12–15	6—12	T—7th	
1994–95	Gary Larson	7–20	6—12	7th	
Gary Larson:		67–69 (.493)	38–52 (.422)		
Lynn Griffin (North Central Conference) (1995–1998)
1995–96	Lynn Griffin	6–21	1—17	10th	
1996–97	Lynn Griffin	6–21	2—16	10th	
1997–98	Lynn Griffin	4–16	0—11	–	
1998	Fred Tibbetts	1–6	1—6	10th	
Lynn Griffin:		16–58 (.216)	3–42 (.067)		
Fred Tibbets(overall):		67–53 (.558)	26–41 (.388)		
Chad Lavin (North Central Conference) (1998–2008)
1998–99	Chad Lavin	7–20	3—15	10th	
1999–00	Chad Lavin	11–16	4—14	9th	
2000–01	Chad Lavin	15–12	9—9	T—5th	
2001–02	Chad Lavin	19–9	12—6	T—2nd	
2002–03	Chad Lavin	27–5	14—2	T—1st	NCAA Division II Regional Finals
2003–04	Chad Lavin	25–8	9—5	4th	NCAA Division II First Round
2004–05	Chad Lavin	17–13	3—9	7th	
2005–06	Chad Lavin	15–13	3—9	6th	
2006–07	Chad Lavin	22–9	6—6	3rd	NCAA Division II First Round
2007–08	Chad Lavin	33–2	12—0	1st	NCAA Division II Runner-up
Chad Lavin (overall):		273–139 (.663)	112–88 (.560)		
Ryun Williams (NCAA Division I Independent) (2008–2009)
2008–09	Ryun Williams	18–11			
Ryun Williams (Great West Conference) (2009–2011)
2009–10	Ryun Williams	15–16	6—6	4th	
2010–11	Ryun Williams	20–12	10—2	2nd	WBI Second Round
Ryun Williams (Summit League) (2011–2012)
2011–12	Ryun Williams	23–8	12—6	3rd	WNIT Second Round
Ryun Williams:		76–47 (.618)	28–14 (.667)		
Amy Williams (Summit League) (2012–2016)
2012–13	Amy Williams	19–16	10—6	3rd	WBI Semifinals
2013–14	Amy Williams	19–14	7—7	4th	NCAA first round
2014–15	Amy Williams	26–8	13—3	1st	WNIT Second Round
2015–16	Amy Williams	32–6	15—1	1st	WNIT Champions
Amy Williams:		96–44 (.686)	45–17 (.726)		
Dawn Plitzuweit (Summit League) (2016–2022)
2016–17	Dawn Plitzuweit	23–9	11—5	4th	WNIT Second Round
2017–18	Dawn Plitzuweit	29–7	14—0	1st	WNIT Quarterfinals
2018–19	Dawn Plitzuweit	28–6	14—2	2nd	NCAA First Round
2019–20	Dawn Plitzuweit	30–2	16—0	1st	NCAA Tournament not held
2020–21	Dawn Plitzuweit	19–6	12—2	2nd	NCAA First Round
2021–22	Dawn Plitzuweit	29–6	17—1	1st	NCAA Sweet Sixteen
Dawn Plitzuweit:		158–36 (.814)	84–10 (.894)		
Kayla Karius (Summit League) (2022–2024)
2022–23	Kayla Karius	14–16	10–8	4th	
2023–24	Kayla Karius	23–13	9–7	4th	
Kayla Karius:		37–29 (.561)	19–15 (.559)		
Carrie Eighmey (Summit League) (2024–present)
2024–25	Carrie Eighmey	0–0	0–0		
Carrie Eighmey:		0–0 (–)	0–0 (–)		
Total:		913–572 (.615)			
National champion Postseason invitational champion Conference regular season champion Conference regular season and conference tournament champion Division regular season champion Division regular season and conference tournament champion Conference tournament champion
