= Western Illinois Leathernecks women's basketball =

2025–26 Western Illinois Leathernecks women's basketball team
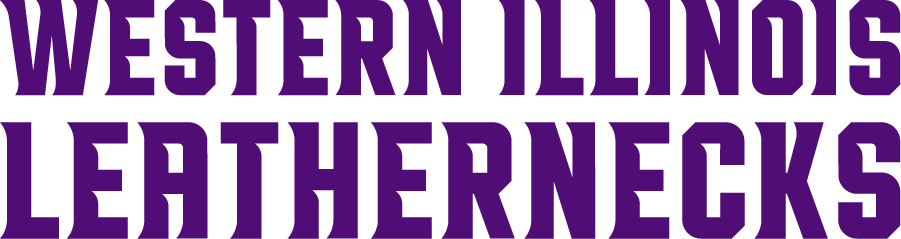
- University: Western Illinois University
- Athletic director: Paul Bubb
- Head coach: JD Gravina (15th season)
- Location: Macomb, Illinois
- Arena: Western Hall (capacity: 5,139)
- Conference: Ohio Valley Conference
- Nickname: Leathernecks
- Colors: Purple and gold
- Student section: Purple Platoon

NCAA Division I tournament appearances
- 1995, 2017, 2026

Conference tournament champions
- Summit: 1995, 2017; OVC: 2026

Conference regular-season champions
- Summit: 1995, 2003, 2004, 2005, 2006, 2017; OVC: 2026

Uniforms
Home	Away

The Western Illinois Leathernecks women's basketball team represents Western Illinois University of Macomb, Illinois, in NCAA Division I women's college basketball competition. The school's team currently competes in the Ohio Valley Conference. The Leathernecks became a member of the Ohio Valley Conference on July 1, 2023.

== History ==
In their first NCAA Tournament appearance in 1995, they lost to North Carolina 89–48. They made appearances in the WNIT in 2003 and 2006 along with an appearance in the WBI in 2016.

Western Illinois were 2016–17 Summit League Champions.

March 28 is WIU Leatherneck Women's Basketball Day in Macomb, Illinois. The team was recognized for their 2016–2017 record where they finished 26–7 in the Summit League and advancing to the NCAA tournament.

== 2017 Summit League Tournament ==
Western Illinois was the Number 1 seed in the tournament. They won the Summit League Tournament on March 7, 2017, with a 77–69 overtime win defeating IUPUI. The win sends the Leatherneck's to the NCAA Tournament, their first appearance since 1995. The win was WIU's 11th consecutive of the season, tying the team record set in 1995.

Both Morgan Blumer and Emily Clemens were named to the All-Tournament League, with Clemens being named tournament MVP.

== NCAA tournament results ==
The Leathernecks have appeared in the NCAA tournament three times. They have a record of 0–3.

Year	Seed	Round	Opponent	Result
1995	#14	First Round	#3 North Carolina	L 48−89
2017	#14	First Round	#3 Florida State	L 66−87
2026	#13	First Round	#4 North Carolina	L 51−83

== Season–by–season results ==
Statistics overview
Season	Coach	Overall	Conference	Standing	Postseason
Bea Yeager (No Conference) (1971–1982)
1971–72	Bea Yeager	10–8	—	—	
1972–73	Bea Yeager	11–7	—	—	
1973–74	Bea Yeager	13–8	—	—	
1974–75	Bea Yeager	6–11	—	—	
1975–76	Bea Yeager	8–10	—	—	
1976–77	Bea Yeager	11–11	—	—	
1977–78	Bea Yeager	14–8	—	—	
1978–79	Bea Yeager	14–7	—	—	
1979–80	Bea Yeager	13–11	—	—	
1980–81	Bea Yeager	13–12	—	—	
1981–82	Bea Yeager	7–21	—	—	
Bea Yeager:		121–115 (.513)	–		
Teresa Check (Gateway Collegiate Athletic Conference) (1982–1986)
1982–83	Teresa Check	5–22	1—7	10th	
1983–84	Teresa Check	8–19	5—13	8th	
1984–85	Teresa Check	6–21	3—15	9th	
1985–86	Teresa Check	4–23	1—17	10th	
Bea Yeager:		23–85 (.213)	10–52 (.161)		
Kathy Markey (Gateway Collegiate Athletic Conference) (1986–1987)
1986–87	Kathy Markey	5–21	3—15	10th	
Kathy Markey:		5–21 (.192)	3–15 (.167)		
Kelly Hill (Gateway Collegiate Athletic Conference) (1987–1992)
1987–88	Kelly Hill	4–22	2—16	10th	
1988–89	Kelly Hill	9–18	7—8	6th	
1989–90	Kelly Hill	7–20	4—14	9th	
1990–91	Kelly Hill	11–16	6—12	8th	
1991–92	Kelly Hill	9–18	5—13	8th	
Kelly Hill:		45–115 (.281)	24–63 (.276)		
Regina Miller (Mid-Continent Conference) (1992–1998)
1992–93	Regina Miller	3–21	1—15	9th	
1993–94	Regina Miller	15–13	11—7	3rd	
1994–95	Regina Miller	17–12	14—4	1st	NCAA First Round
1995–96	Regina Miller	10–17	8—10	8th	
1996–97	Regina Miller	7–20	4—12	7th	
1997–98	Regina Miller	8–18	5—11	7th	
Regina Miller:		60–101 (.373)	43–59 (.422)		
Leslie Crane (Mid-Continent Conference/Summit League) (1998–2011)
1998–99	Leslie Crane	7–19	4—7	7th	
1999–00	Leslie Crane	18–11	11—5	3rd	
2000–01	Leslie Crane	16–12	11—6	3rd	
2001–02	Leslie Crane	16–12	11—6	3rd	
2002–03	Leslie Crane	21–9	12—2	1st	WNIT First Round
2003–04	Leslie Crane	20–9	19—9	1st	
2004–05	Leslie Crane	19–9	13—3	1st	
2005–06	Leslie Crane	23–7	13—3	1st	WNIT First Round
2006–07	Leslie Crane	10–19	6—8	5th	
2007–08	Leslie Crane	14–16	12—6	T–2nd	
2008–09	Leslie Crane	9–21	7—11	T–6th	
2009–10	Leslie Crane	11–20	6—12	7th	
2010–11	Leslie Crane	8–21	6—12	8th	
Leslie Crane:		192–185 (.509)	122–84 (.592)		
J. D. Gravina (Summit League) (2011–2023)
2011–12	J. D. Gravina	12–19	7—11	T–6th	
2012–13	J. D. Gravina	14–16	7—9	5th	
2013–14	J. D. Gravina	14–16	6—8	5th	
2014–15	J. D. Gravina	17–13	9—7	T–3rd	
2015–16	J. D. Gravina	16–16	8—8	5th	WBI Quarterfinals
2016–17	J. D. Gravina	26–7	13—3	1st	NCAA First Round
2017–18	J. D. Gravina	22–10	10—4	3rd	WNIT First Round
2018–19	J. D. Gravina	12–18	8—8	5th	
2019–20	J. D. Gravina	15–15	9—7	T–3rd	
2020–21	J. D. Gravina	8–16	6—8	5th	
2021–22	J. D. Gravina	14–15	5—13	7th	
2022–23	J. D. Gravina	10–20	5—13	9th	
J. D. Gravina:		180–181 (.499)	93–99 (.484)		
J. D. Gravina (Ohio Valley Conference) (2023–present)
2023–24	J. D. Gravina	18–12	9—9	7th	
2024–25	J. D. Gravina	17-17	8-12	7th	
2025–26	J. D. Gravina	25-5	16-4	1st	NCAA First Round
J. D. Gravina:		60–34 (.638)	33–25 (.569)		
Total:		686–837 (.450)			
National champion Postseason invitational champion Conference regular season champion Conference regular season and conference tournament champion Division regular season champion Division regular season and conference tournament champion Conference tournament champion

== Notable former players ==
- Tuğba Palazoğlu, Overseas
- Oberon Pitterson, Jamaica basketball and netball international
- Zane Teilane, Women’s National Basketball Association
