= Denver Pioneers women's basketball =

Denver Pioneers
2026–27 Denver Pioneers women's basketball team
- University: University of Denver
- Head coach: Erik Johnson (1st in 2nd stint, 5th overall season)
- Location: Denver, Colorado
- Arena: Hamilton Gymnasium (capacity: 2,000)
- Conference: West Coast Conference
- Nickname: Pioneers
- Colors: Crimson and gold

NCAA Division I tournament appearances
- 2001

Uniforms
Home	Away

The Denver Pioneers women's basketball team represents the University of Denver and competes in the NCAA Division I women's college basketball in Denver, Colorado.

== History ==
Denver began play in 1974, after a few years playing as a club sport. They played in the Intermountain Conference from 1974–1978, the Continental Divide/Colorado Athletic from 1978–1996, and the Rocky Mountain from 1996–98 before joining Division I play in 1998.

In the 2000–01 season, the Pioneers won 24 games and went 14–2 to win the West Division in the conference. In the Sun Belt Conference championship game, they lost 67–55 to Louisiana Tech. Despite the loss, they were invited to the NCAA Division I Tournament for the first time in school history. In the First Round, they were beaten 77–57 by Virginia Tech.

Denver has made two appearances in the WNIT, in 2011 and 2019. They lost 75–60 to BYU in the First Round in 2011 and beat the University of New Mexico 83–75 in the First Round in 2019. Then went on to lose to the University of Idaho 66–88 in the Second Round in 2019. The Pioneers played in the Western Athletic Conference for 2012–13 before joining the Summit League in 2013.

== Postseason ==
=== NCAA Division I tournament results ===
The Pioneers have made one appearance in the NCAA Division I women's basketball tournament. They have a combined record of 0–1.

Year	Seed	Round	Opponent	Result
2001	#10	First Round	#7 Virginia Tech	L 57–77

=== NCAA Division II tournament results ===
The Pioneers made two appearances in the NCAA Division II women's basketball tournament. They had a combined record of 0–2.

Year	Round	Opponent	Result
1993	First Round	North Dakota State	L 77–92
1995	First Round	South Dakota State	L 59–95

== Season–by–season results ==
Record table
Season	Coach	Overall	Conference	Standing	Postseason
Leslie Rowe (Intermountain Athletic Conference) (1974–1975)
1974–75	Leslie Rowe	2–12	—	—	
Leslie Rowe:		2–12 (.143)	–		
Barbara Breeding (Intermountain Athletic Conference) (1975–1978)
1975–76	Barbara Breeding	7–14	—	—	
1976–77	Barbara Breeding	19–6	4—1	—	IAIAW Regional Tournament
1977–78	Barbara Breeding	19–12	8—4	—	
Leslie Rowe:		45–32 (.584)	12–5 (.706)		
Bernie Barras (Intermountain Athletic Conference/ Continental Divide Conference) (1978–1984)
1978–79	Bernie Barras	18–12	7—5	—	
1979–80	Bernie Barras	23–10	9—3	—	AIAW Playoffs
1980–81	Bernie Barras	12–16	6—4	—	AIAW Playoffs
1981–82	Bernie Barras	14–12	0—6	—	
1982–83	Bernie Barras	15–7	4—2	—	
1983–84	Bernie Barras	20–6	3—3	—	
Bernie Barras:		102–63 (.618)	30–23 (.566)		
Bruce Casagrande (Continental Divide Conference) (1984–1985)
1984–85	Bruce Casagrande	20–7	8—6	—	
Bernie Barras:		20–7 (.741)	8–6 (.571)		
Renee Bailey–Phoenix (Continental Divide Conference) (1985–1989)
1985–86	Renee Bailey–Phoenix	19–9	9—5	—	
1986–87	Renee Bailey–Phoenix	12–16	6—8	—	
1987–88	Renee Bailey–Phoenix	9–19	2—10	—	
1988–89	Renee Bailey–Phoenix	17–12	7—7	—	
Renee Bailey–Phoenix:		57–56 (.504)	24–30 (.444)		
Tracey Sheehan (Continental Divide Conference) (1989–1995)
1989–90	Tracey Sheehan	16–14	6—6	—	
1990–91	Tracey Sheehan	16–12	10—2	—	
1991–92	Tracey Sheehan	22–6	12—2	—	
1992–93	Tracey Sheehan	24–4	14—0	1st	NCAA Division II Regional Semifinals
1993–94	Tracey Sheehan	20–8	13—1	—	
1994–95	Tracey Sheehan	15–14	8—4	—	NCAA Division II First Round
Tracey Sheehan:		113–58 (.661)	63–15 (.808)		
Pam Tanner (Continental Divide Conference/Rocky Mountain Athletic Conference/Independent/Sun Belt Conference) (1995–2008)
1995–96	Pam Tanner	21–7	13—1	—	
1996–97	Pam Tanner	11–15	7—6	—	
1997–98	Pam Tanner	12–15	10—5		
1998–99	Pam Tanner	12–16	—	—	
1999–00	Pam Tanner	16–11	10—6	T—3rd	
2000–01	Pam Tanner	24–7	14—2	1st (West)	NCAA First Round
2001–02	Pam Tanner	16–13	11—4	2nd (West)	
2002–03	Pam Tanner	12–18	6—9	T—4th (West)	
2003–04	Pam Tanner	14–15	6—9	T—4th (West)	
2004–05	Pam Tanner	6–22	4—11	T—4th (West)	
2005–06	Pam Tanner	15–13	8—7	T—2nd (West)	
2006–07	Pam Tanner	20–11	12—6	T—2nd (West)	
2007–08	Pam Tanner	11–19	6—12	6th (West)	
Pam Tanner:		190–181 (.512)	77–76 (.503)		
Erik Johnson (Sun Belt Conference) (2008–2012)
2008–09	Erik Johnson	16–15	10—8	T–2nd (West)	
2009–10	Erik Johnson	18–13	12—6	2nd (West)	
2010–11	Erik Johnson	19–12	11—5	2nd (West)	WNIT First Round
2011–12	Erik Johnson	19–12	11—5	2nd (West)	
Erik Johnson:		72–52 (.581)	44–24 (.647)		
Kerry Cremeans (Western Athletic Conference/Summit League) (2012–2017)
2012–13	Kerry Cremeans	14–17	8—10	T–6th	
2013–14	Kerry Cremeans	9–23	5—9	6th	
2014–15	Kerry Cremeans	8–23	5—11	T–7th	
2015–16	Kerry Cremeans	5–25	3—13	T–7th	
2016–17	Kerry Cremeans	6–24	3—13	8th	
Kerry Cremeans:		42–112 (.273)	24–56 (.300)		
Jim Turgeon (Summit League) (2017–2020)
2017–18	Jim Turgeon	16–14	7—7	T–4th	
2018–19	Jim Turgeon	18–14	10—6	T–3rd	WNIT Second Round
2019–20	Jim Turgeon/Kayla Ard	15–15	9—7	T–3rd	
Jim Turgeon:		42–39 (.519)	19–17 (.528)		
Kayla Ard:		7–4 (.636)	7–3 (.700)		
Doshia Woods (Summit League) (2020–2026)
2020–21	Doshia Woods	7–16	5–9	6th	
2021–22	Doshia Woods	10–20	5–13	8th	
2022–23	Doshia Woods	12–18	8–10	T–5th	
2023–24	Doshia Woods	8-22	5-11	T–6th	
2024–25	Doshia Woods	9-21	2-14	9th	
2025–26	Doshia Woods	11-19	5-11	6th	
Doshia Woods:		57–116 (.329)	30–68 (.306)		
Total:		698–668 (.511)			
National champion Postseason invitational champion Conference regular season champion Conference regular season and conference tournament champion Division regular season champion Division regular season and conference tournament champion Conference tournament champion
