= Kansas City Roos women's basketball =

2026–27 Kansas City Roos women's basketball team
- University: University of Missouri–Kansas City
- Head coach: Candi Whitaker (1st in 2nd stint, 6th overall season)
- Location: Kansas City, Missouri
- Arena: Municipal Auditorium (capacity: 7,316)
- Conference: Summit League
- Nickname: Roos
- Colors: Blue and gold

Conference regular-season champions
- 2020

Uniforms
Home	Away

The Kansas City Roos women's basketball team represents the University of Missouri-Kansas City in Kansas City, Missouri. The school's team currently competes in the Summit League.

== History ==
UMKC began play in 1980. They competed in the NAIA from 1980 to 1987, going 159–48 while finishing 3rd in 1983 and 5th in 1985. They played in the Mid-Continent Conference/Summit League from 1994 to 2013 before joining the WAC in 2013. They have never played in the Division I NCAA Tournament, but they have played in the Women's Basketball Invitational in 2010 and the WNIT in 2012. As of the end of the 2015–16 season, they have an all-time record of 336–488.

=== Season by season ===
Record table
Season	Coach	Overall	Conference	Standing	Postseason
Bill Ross (NAIA) (1980–1980)
1980–81	Bill Ross	1–4			
Bill Ross:		1–4 (.200)			
Nancy Norman (NAIA) (1980–1988)
1980–81	Nancy Norman	4–12			
1981–82	Nancy Norman	19–4			
1982–83	Nancy Norman	30–5			NAIA Second Round
1983–84	Nancy Norman	26–4			
1984–85	Nancy Norman	29–6			NAIA Second Round
1985–86	Nancy Norman	26–6			
1986–87	Nancy Norman	24–7			
1987–88	Nancy Norman	9–16			
Nancy Norman:		167–60 (.736)			
Brian Agler (NAIA) (1988–1993)
1988–89	Brian Agler	9–16			
1989–90	Brian Agler	17–11			
1990–91	Brian Agler	18–10			
1991–92	Brian Agler	24–7			
1992–93	Brian Agler	17–10			
Brian Agler:		85–54 (.612)			
David Glass (NAIA) (1993–1994)
1993–94	David Glass	9–18			
David Glass (Mid-Continent Conference) (1994–1996)
1994–95	David Glass	7–20	4–11	T–6th	
1995–96	David Glass	11–16	9–9	T–6th	
David Glass:		27–54 (.333)	13–20 (.394)		
Jeff Tadtman (Mid-Continent Conference) (1996–2000)
1996–97	Jeff Tadtman	9–18	8–8	6th	
1997–98	Jeff Tadtman	10–17	8–8	T–5th	
1998–99	Jeff Tadtman	13–14	7–7	5th	
1999–2000	Jeff Tadtman	9–19	4–12	8th	
Jeff Tadtman:		41–68 (.376)	27–35 (.435)		
Dana Eikenberg (Mid-Continent Conference) (2000–2004)
2000–01	Dana Eikenberg	2–25	2–14	9th	
2001–02	Dana Eikenberg	7–21	3–11	8th	
2002–03	Dana Eikenberg	14–14	8–6	3rd	
2003–04	Dana Eikenberg	15–14	11–5	3rd	
Dana Eikenberg:		38–74 (.339)	24–36 (.400)		
Bo Overton (Mid-Continent Conference) (2004–2006)
2004–05	Bo Overton	10–20	5–11	7th	
2005–06	Bo Overton	10–18	8–8	T–5th	
2006–07	Bo Overton	2–9	0–0		
Bo Overton:		22–47 (.319)	13–19 (.406)		
Candace Whitaker (Mid-Continent Conference) (2006–2007)
2006–07	Candace Whitaker	7–11	5–8	6th	
Candace Whitaker (Summit League) (2007–2012)
2007–08	Candace Whitaker	7–20	0–15	9th	
2008–09	Candace Whitaker	11–18	6–11	T–6th	
2009–10	Candace Whitaker	16–16	12–6	4th	WBI First Round
2010–11	Candace Whitaker	14–16	9–9	T–6th	
2011–12	Candace Whitaker	22–12	11–7	4th	WNIT First Round
Candace Whitaker:		77–93 (.453)	43–56 (.434)		
Marsha Frese (Summit League) (2012–2013)
2012–13	Marsha Frese	9–21	5–11	8th	
Marsha Frese (Western Athletic Conference) (2013–2017)
2013–14	Marsha Frese	11–19	7–9	T–6th	
2014–15	Marsha Frese	7–24	4–10	7th	
2015–16	Marsha Frese	10–18	5–9	6th	
2016–17	Marsha Frese	10–19	4–10	6th	
Marsha Frese:		47–101 (.318)	25–49 (.338)		
Jacie Hoyt (Western Athletic Conference) (2017–present)
2017–18	Jacie Hoyt	11–19	7–7	5th	
2018–19	Jacie Hoyt	16–15	9–7	T–4th	
2019–20	Jacie Hoyt	21–10	13–3	1st	Postseason not held
Jacie Hoyt (Summit League) (2020–present)
2020–21	Jacie Hoyt	10–12	7–6	4th	
Jacie Hoyt:		58–56 (.509)	36–23 (.610)		
Dionnah Jackson-Durrett (Summit League) (2022–2026)
2022–23	Dionnah Jackson-Durrett	9–23	3–15	10th	
2023–24	Dionnah Jackson-Durrett	12–20	3–13	8th–T	
2024–25	Dionnah Jackson-Durrett	12–21	6–10	5th–T	
2025–26	Dionnah Jackson-Durrett	7–23	4–12	7th	
Dionnah Jackson-Durrett:		40–87 (.315)	16–50 (.242)		
Candi Whitaker (Summit League) (2026–present)
2026–27	Candi Whitaker	–	–		
Candi Whitaker:		–	–		
Total:		603-698 (.463)			
National champion Postseason invitational champion Conference regular season champion Conference regular season and conference tournament champion Division regular season champion Division regular season and conference tournament champion Conference tournament champion

== Postseason results ==
=== NAIA tournament ===
The Kangaroos appeared in two NAIA Tournament. Their record is 3–2.

Year	Seed	Round	Opponent	Result
1983	#4	First Round; Second Round; Third Place game	#5 Saginaw Valley #1 SW Oklahoma State #2 Portland (OR)	W 74–67; L 69–81; W 85–65
1985	#8	First Round; Second Round	NR Pembroke State #1 SW Oklahoma State	W 72–68; L 60–65

=== WBI tournament ===
The Kangaroos appeared in one Women's Basketball Invitational (WBI). Their record is 0–1.

Year	Round	Opponent	Result
2010	First Round	Memphis	L 68–72

=== WNIT tournament ===
The Kangaroos appeared in one WNIT. Their record is 0–1.

Year	Round	Opponent	Result
2012	First Round	Missouri State	L 79–81
