= 2026–27 Murray State Racers women's basketball team =

American college basketball season

2026–27 Murray State Racers women's basketball
- Conference: Missouri Valley Conference
- Record: 2–3 (0–0 MVC)
- Head coach: Rechelle Turner (10th season)
- Associate head coach: Mark Stephens
- Assistant coaches: Monica Evans; Nieja Tucker; Katelyn Cox
- Home arena: CFSB Center

2026–27 Missouri Valley Conference women's basketball standings
	Conf.				Overall
Team	W		L	PCT	W		L	PCT
Illinois State	0	–	0	–	6	–	0	1.000
UIC	0	–	0	–	3	–	2	.600
Indiana State	0	–	0	–	3	–	3	.500
Bradley	0	–	0	–	2	–	3	.400
Drake	0	–	0	–	2	–	3	.400
Murray State	0	–	0	–	2	–	3	.400
Southern Illinois	0	–	0	–	1	–	3	.250
Belmont	0	–	0	–	1	–	4	.200
Northern Iowa	0	–	0	–	1	–	4	.200
Valparaiso	0	–	0	–	1	–	4	.200
Evansville	0	–	0	–	0	–	5	.000
† 2027 MVC tournament winner As of November 19, 2026

The 2026–27 Murray State Racers women's basketball team represented Murray State University during the 2026–27 NCAA Division I women's basketball season. The Racers, led by tenth-year head coach Rechelle Turner, played their home games at the CFSB Center in Murray, Kentucky, as fourth-year members of the Missouri Valley Conference (MVC).

== Previous season ==
The Racers finished the 2025–26 season 31–4, 19–1 in MVC play, to finish to win the Missouri Valley regular season title. As the No. 1 seed in the Missouri Valley tournament, they defeated Indiana State, Northern Iowa and Evansville to earn an automatic trip to the NCAA Tournament as the No. 12 seed in the Fort Worth Regional 1, where they were defeated by Maryland in the first round.

== Offseason ==
=== Departures ===
Murray State departures
Name	Num.	Pos.	Height	Year	Hometown	Reason for departure
Jada Cook	0	G	5'8"	Sophomore	Roanoke, VA	Transferred to Stony Brook
Briley Pena	3	G	5'4"	Senior	Jonesboro, AR	Graduated
Ellery Minch	12	F	6'3"	Sophomore	McCordsville, IN	Transferred to Western Kentucky
Gabby Spink	15	G	5'9"	Freshman	Haubstadt, IN	Transferred to Saint Louis
Braxcynn Baker	20	G	5'11"	Sophomore	Lowell, MI	Transferred to Southern Illinois

=== Incoming transfers ===
Murray State incoming transfers
Name	Num.	Pos.	Height	Year	Hometown	Previous school
Claire Johnson	3	G	5'9"	Junior	Paducah, KY	Nebraska
Sydney Huber	8	G	6'0"	Sophomore	Cedar Rapids, IA	Evansville

=== Recruiting class ===
There was no 2026 recruiting class.

== Preseason ==
On October 13, 2026, the MWC released its annual preseason poll and honor awards. Murray State was unanimously picked to finish first in the conference, earning all forty-one first-place votes.

=== Preseason rankings ===
MVC Preseason Poll
Predicted finish	Team	Votes (1st place)
1	Murray State	477 (41)
2	Illinois State	396
3	Belmont	375 (2)
4	Northern Iowa	343 (1)
5	Drake	317
6	UIC	267

=== Preseason honors ===
"Players to Watch" List
Player	Position	Year	Hometown
Sharnecce Currie-Jelks	G	SR	Topeka, KS
Haven Ford	G	SR	Morehead, KY
Halli Poock	G	SR	Waterloo, IA
Keslyn Secrist	G	SR	Draper, VA

== Roster ==
2026–27 Murray State Racers women's basketball team
Players
Coaches

Pos.	#	Name	Height	Year	Previous school	Hometown
G	1	Halli Poock	5 ft 6 in (1.68 m)	Sr	Bradley	Waterloo, Iowa
G	2	Haven Ford	5 ft 6 in (1.68 m)	Sr	Rowan County Senior High School	Morehead, Kentucky
G	3	Claire Johnson	5 ft 9 in (1.75 m)	Jr	Nebraska	Paducah, Kentucky
F	4	Jaidynn Askins	6 ft 1 in (1.85 m)	RS Fr	Southside High School	Jackson, Tennessee
G	5	Mary Grant	5 ft 8 in (1.73 m)	Fr	Bishop Miege High School	Mission, Kansas
G	7	Alice Magnaini	6 ft 0 in (1.83 m)	RS Fr	Star of the Sea College	Melbourne, Australia
G	8	Sydney Huber	6 ft 0 in (1.83 m)	So	Evansville	Cedar Rapids, Iowa
F	10	Katie Reed	6 ft 3 in (1.91 m)	Fr	Washington High School	Washington, Indiana
G	11	Keslyn Secrist	5 ft 10 in (1.78 m)	Sr	Indiana State	Draper, Virginia
G/F	13	Alli Linke	6 ft 1 in (1.85 m)	Fr	Prospect High School	Mount Prospect, Illinois
F	22	Cam Hoover	6 ft 0 in (1.83 m)	RS So	Woodridge High School	Cuyahoga Falls, Ohio
F	23	Sharnecce Currie-Jelks	6 ft 2 in (1.88 m)	Sr	Indiana	Jackson, Tennessee
G/F	25	Destiny Thomas	5 ft 10 in (1.78 m)	Sr	McCracken County High School	Paducah, Kentucky
F	33	Sophie Terry	6 ft 0 in (1.83 m)	Fr	Raymore–Peculiar High School	Raymore, Missouri

Head coach

- Rechelle Turner (Murray State)

Assistant coach(es)

- Mark Stephens (Morehead State)
- Monica Evans (Murray State)
- Nieja Tucker (Austin Peay)
- Katelyn Cox (Murray State)

Legend

- (C) Team captain
- (S) Suspended
- (I) Ineligible
- (W) Walk-on
- Injured
- Current redshirt

Roster
Last update: November 16, 2026

== Schedule and results ==
Date time, TV	Rank^{#}	Opponent^{#}	Result	Record	High points	High rebounds	High assists	Site (attendance) city, state
Non-conference regular season
November 2, 2026*; 6:00 p.m., ESPN+		at Southern Indiana	W 82–67	1–0	33 – Poock	9 – Currie-Jelks	6 – Poock	Liberty Arena (1,050); Evansville, IN
November 6, 2026*; 6:30 p.m., ESPN+		vs. Rice; Opening Statement	L 64–69	1–1	20 – Currie-Jelks	12 – Currie-Jelks	3 – Poock	Robins Center (1,434); Richmond, VA
November 8, 2026*; 11:30 a.m.		vs. Princeton; Opening Statement	L 74–76	1–2	29 – Poock	8 – Currie-Jelks	3 – Tied	Robins Center; Richmond, VA
November 12, 2026*; 11:00 a.m., ESPN+		Morehead State	W 81–72	2–2	21 – Poock	9 – Currie-Jelks	3 – Tied	CFSB Center (4,167); Murray, KY
November 17, 2026*; 1:00 p.m., B1G+		at Oregon	L 76–97	2–3	20 – Poock	9 – Thomas	3 – Tied	Matthew Knight Arena (5,426); Eugene, OR
November 21, 2026*; 7:00 p.m., ESPN+		Eastern Illinois						CFSB Center; Murray, KY
November 25, 2026*; 11:00 a.m., B1G+		at Purdue						Mackey Arena; West Lafayette, IN
November 28, 2026*; 2:00 p.m., ESPN+		Northern Kentucky						CFSB Center; Murray, KY
December 1, 2026*; 11:00 a.m., ESPN+		at UAB						Bartow Arena; Birmingham, AL
December 5, 2026*; 2:00 p.m., ESPN+		SIU Edwardsville						CFSB Center; Murray, KY
December 13, 2026*; 2:00 p.m., ESPN+		Austin Peay						CFSB Center; Murray, KY
December 15, 2026*; 5:30 p.m., ESPN+		at Bellarmine						Knights Hall; Louisville, KY
MVC regular season
December 18, 2026; 5:00 p.m., ESPN+		at Indiana State						Hulman Center; Terre Haute, IN
December 20, 2026; 2:00 p.m., ESPN+		Bradley						CFSB Center; Murray, KY
December 29, 2026; 6:00 p.m., ESPN+		at Southern Illinois						Banterra Center; Carbondale, IL
December 31, 2026; 6:00 p.m., ESPN+		Illinois State						CFSB Center; Murray, KY
January 3, 2027; 2:00 p.m., ESPN+		UIC						CFSB Center; Murray, KY
January 7, 2027; 6:00 p.m., ESPN+		Valparaiso						CFSB Center; Murray, KY
January 11, 2027; 6:00 p.m., ESPN+		Evansville						CFSB Center; Murray, KY
January 14, 2027; 6:00 p.m., ESPN+		at Drake						Knapp Center; Des Moines, IA
January 16, 2027; 2:00 p.m., ESPN+		at Northern Iowa						McLeod Center; Cedar Falls, IA
January 22, 2027; 6:00 p.m., ESPN+		at Valparaiso						Athletics–Recreation Center; Valparaiso, IN
January 24, 2027; 2:00 p.m., ESPN+		at Illinois State						CEFCU Arena; Normal, IL
January 28, 2027; 6:00 p.m., ESPN+		at Bradley						Renaissance Coliseum; Peoria, IL
January 30, 2027; TBA, ESPN+		Belmont						CFSB Center; Murray, KY
February 5, 2027; 6:00 p.m., ESPN+		Northern Iowa						CFSB Center; Murray, KY
February 7, 2027; 2:00 p.m., ESPN+		Drake						CFSB Center; Murray, KY
February 12, 2027; 11:00 a.m., ESPN+		at UIC						Credit Union 1 Arena; Chicago, IL
February 19, 2027; 6:00 p.m., ESPN+		Southern Illinois						CFSB Center; Murray, KY
February 21, 2027; 2:00 p.m., ESPN+		at Belmont						Curb Event Center; Nashville, TN
February 25, 2027; 6:00 p.m., ESPN+		at Evansville						Meeks Family Fieldhouse; Evansville, IN
February 27, 2027; 2:00 p.m., ESPN+		Indiana State						CFSB Center; Murray, KY
MVC tournament
March 3–7, 2027; TBA		vs.						Enterprise Center; St. Louis, MO
*Non-conference game. ^{#}Rankings from AP Poll. (#) Tournament seedings in parentheses. All times are in Central.
