= South Dakota State Jackrabbits women's basketball =

South Dakota State Jackrabbits
2026–27 South Dakota State Jackrabbits women's basketball team
- University: South Dakota State University
- Head coach: Aaron Johnston (27th season)
- Location: Brookings, South Dakota
- Arena: First Bank and Trust Arena (capacity: 5,500)
- Conference: Summit League
- Nickname: Jackrabbits
- Colors: Blue and yellow

NCAA Division I tournament champions
- Division II; 2003
Other NCAA Division I tournament results
Final Four	Division II; 2002, 2003
Elite Eight	Division II; 2002, 2003, 2004
Sweet Sixteen	Division II; 1994, 1995, 2002, 2003, 2004; Division I 2019
Appearances	Division II; 1988, 1992, 1994, 1995, 1996, 1999, 2002, 2003, 2004; Division I 2009, 2010, 2011, 2012, 2013, 2015, 2016, 2018, 2019, 2021, 2023, 2024, 2025, 2026

AIAW tournament appearances
- 1972

Conference tournament champions
- Summit League: 2009, 2010, 2011, 2012, 2013, 2015, 2016, 2018, 2019, 2023, 2024, 2025, 2026

Conference regular-season champions
- NCC: 2003, 2004; Summit League: 2008, 2009, 2012, 2013, 2014, 2019, 2021, 2022, 2023, 2024, 2025

Uniforms
Home	Away

The South Dakota State Jackrabbits women's basketball team is part of the athletic program at South Dakota State University in Brookings, South Dakota. The NCAA Division I team is a member of The Summit League. The Jackrabbits' head coach is Aaron Johnston.

== History ==
South Dakota State began play in 1966. In the times they were in the AIAW, they won the State title 11 times from 1969 to 1982, including six straight from 1969 to 1975, including a Regional title in 1972. In their time in Division II, they made the NCAA Division II women's basketball tournament in 1988, 1992, 1994, 1995, 1996, 1999, 2002, 2003, and 2004. They garnered a record of 18–8. In 2003, they won an NCAA Division II national title when they defeated Northern Kentucky by a score of 65–50. They began play in Division I in 2004. Prior to joining the Division I Summit League, they were a member of the Division II North Central Conference. As of the end of the 2024–25 season, they have a 1154–463 all-time record, which is the 9th-most Division I wins of all time.

The Jackrabbits played in the NCAA Women's Division I Basketball Championship in each of their first five years of eligibility, 2009, 2010, 2011, 2012, and 2013. They also played in the NCAA D-I Basketball Championship in 2015, 2016, 2018 and 2019, making it to the Sweet Sixteen in 2019. The Jackrabbits played in the 2007, 2008, 2014, and 2017 Women's WNIT Tournaments. In their Division I history, the team has compiled four regular-season Summit League titles and seven Summit League postseason conference-tourney titles. The 2008–2009 team was ranked #14 in ESPN/USA Today Division I Coaches Poll en route to a 32–3 record, and received substantial national media coverage. The 2018–2019 team was ranked as the #1 Mid-Major team, and during the regular season was ranked in the top 25 overall for Division I.

== Postseason appearances ==
=== NCAA Division I Tournament results ===
The Jackrabbits have appeared in fourteen NCAA Division I Tournaments. They achieved their highest ranking in 2019 with a #6 seed. Their overall record is 6–14.

Year	Seed	Round	Opponent	Result
2009	#7	First round Second round	#10 TCU #2 Baylor	W 90–55; L 58–60
2010	#14	First round	#3 Oklahoma	L 57–68
2011	#15	First round	#2 Xavier	L 56–72
2012	#13	First round	#4 Purdue	L 68–83
2013	#13	First round	#4 South Carolina	L 53–74
2015	#14	First round	#3 Oregon State	L 62–74
2016	#12	First round Second round	#5 Miami #4 Stanford	W 74–71; L 65–66
2018	#8	First round	#9 Villanova	L 74–81 (OT)
2019	#6	First round Second round Sweet Sixteen	#11 Quinnipiac #3 Syracuse #2 Oregon	W 76–65; W 75–64; L 53–63
2021	#9	First round	#8 Syracuse	L 55–72
2023	#9	First round Second round	#8 USC #1 Virginia Tech	W 62–57 (OT); L 60–72
2024	#12	First round	#5 Utah	L 54–68
2025	#10	First round Second round	#7 Oklahoma State #2 Connecticut	W 74–68; L 57-91
2026	#11	First round	#6 Washington	L 54–72

=== WNIT appearances ===
The Jackrabbits have appeared in five WNIT Tournaments. Their record is 13–4. They were the 2022 Champions.

Year	Round	Opponent	Result
2007	First round Second round Third round Quarterfinals	Bye; Illinois State; Indiana; Wyoming	Bye; W 61–48; W 60–53; L 59–70
2008	First round	Creighton	L 69–76
2014	First round Second round Third round Quarterfinals; Semifinals	Butler; Creighton; Minnesota; Indiana; UTEP	W 78–61; W 62–51; W 70–62; W 76–64; L 63–66
2017	First round Second round	Northern Illinois; Colorado	W 94–84; L 75–81 (OT)
2022	First round Second round Third round Quarterfinals; Semifinals; Championship	Ohio; Minnesota; Drake; Alabama; UCLA; Seton Hall	W 87–57; W 78–57; W 84–66; W 78–73; W 62–59; W 82–50

=== AIAW Tournament appearances ===
The Jackrabbits made one appearance in the AIAW women's basketball tournament. They had a combined record of 0–2.

Year	Round	Opponent	Result
1972	Championship first round Consolation first round	Immaculata; Southern Connecticut State	L, 47–60; L, 34–72

=== NCAA Division II tournament results ===
The Jackrabbits made nine appearances in the NCAA Division II women's basketball tournament. They had a combined record of 18–8.

Year	Round	Opponent	Result
1988	First round Regional finals	North Dakota; North Dakota State	W, 76–60; L, 77–91
1992	First round	North Dakota State	L, 58–92
1994	First round Regional semifinals Regional finals	Nebraska-Kearney; North Dakota; North Dakota State	W, 81–68; W, 61–51; L, 52–82
1995	First round Regional semifinals Regional finals	Denver; North Dakota; North Dakota State	W, 95–59; W, 78–75; L, 68–82
1996	Regional semifinals	North Dakota	L, 55–68
1999	First round	Augustana (SD)	L, 62–66
2002	First round Regional semifinals Regional finals Elite Eight; Final Four	Regis; Colorado Mesa; Southwest Minnesota State; Northern Kentucky; Southeastern Oklahoma	W, 91–76; W, 76–63; W, 62–50; W, 68–67; L, 67–77
2003	First round Regional semifinals Regional finals Elite Eight; Final Four; National Championship	Regis; North Dakota; South Dakota; Cal State Bakersfield; Bentley; Northern Kentucky	W, 107–71; W, 77–56; W, 87–63; W, 83–62; W, 69–62; W, 65–50
2004	First round Regional Finals; Regional semifinals Elite Eight	Nebraska–Kearney; Concordia-St. Paul; North Dakota; California (PA)	W, 67–56; W, 74–39; W, 72–70 (OT); L, 79–96

== Season–by–season results ==
Season	Team	Overall	Conference	Standing	Postseason	Coaches' poll	AP poll
Norma Boetel (no conference) (1966–1970)
1966–67	Norma Boetel	6–0	—	—	—	—	—
1967–68	Norma Boetel	7–0	—	—	—	—	—
1968–69	Norma Boetel	8–0	—	—	—	—	—
1969–70	Norma Boetel	14–1	—	—	—	—	—
Ruth Marske (no conference) (1970–1972)
1970–71	Ruth Marske	15–2	—	—	—	—	—
1971–72	Ruth Marske	17–2	—	—	AIAW Consolation First Round	—	—
Ruth Marske:		32–4 (.889)	-				
Norma Boetel (no conference) (1972–1973)
1972–73	Norma Boetel	12–6	—	—	AIAW Region VI Tournament	—	—
Jenny Johnson (no conference) (1972–1973)
1973–74	Jenny Johnson	13–4	—	—	AIAW Region VI Tournament	—	—
Jenny Johnson:		13–4 (.765)	-				
Norma Boetel (no conference) (1974–1976)
1974–75	Norma Boetel	17–6	—	—	AIAW Region VI Tournament	—	—
1975–76	Norma Boetel	16–5	—	—	—	—	—
Norma Boetel:		80–18 (.816)	-				
Cindy Davis (no conference) (1976–1978)
1976–77	Cindy Davis	16–9	—	—	AIAW Region VI Tournament	—	—
1977–78	Cindy Davis	12–11	—	—	AIAW State Tournament	—	—
Cindy Davis:		28–20 (.583)	-				
Mary Ingram (no conference) (1978–1982)
1978–79	Mary Ingram	13–10	—	—	AIAW Region VI Tournament	—	—
1979–80	Mary Ingram	16–11	—	—	AIAW Region VI Tournament	—	—
1980–81	Mary Ingram	12–14	—	—	AIAW Region VI Tournament	—	—
1981–82	Mary Ingram	15–13	—	—	AIAW Region VI Tournament	—	—
Mary Ingram (North Central Conference) (1982–1984)
1982–83	Mary Ingram	8–17	3–7	6th	—	—	—
1983–84	Mary Ingram	8–17	1–11	7th	—	—	—
Mary Ingram:		72–82 (.468)	4–18 (.182)				
Nancy Neiber (North Central Conference) (1984–2000)
1984–85	Nancy Neiber	13–12	4–10	7th	—	—	—
1985–86	Nancy Neiber	11–16	3–11	7th	—	—	—
1986–87	Nancy Neiber	16–13	5–9	T-5th	—	—	—
1987–88	Nancy Neiber	25–5	11–3	2nd	NCAA Division II Regional Second Place	—	—
1988–89	Nancy Neiber	22–6	9–5	4th	—	—	—
1989–90	Nancy Neiber	17–10	9–9	5th	—	—	—
1990–91	Nancy Neiber	18–10	10–8	5th	—	—	—
1991–92	Nancy Neiber	19–10	11–7	5th	NCAA Division II First Round	—	—
1992–93	Nancy Neiber	17–10	10–8	T-4th	—	—	—
1993–94	Nancy Neiber	22–8	12–6	4th	NCAA Division II Regional Second Place	—	—
1994–95	Nancy Neiber	24–6	13–5	3rd	NCAA Division II Regional Second Place	—	—
1995–96	Nancy Neiber	25–3	16–2	2nd	NCAA Division II Regional Semifinals	—	—
1996–97	Nancy Neiber	19–8	11–7	5th	—	—	—
1997–98	Nancy Neiber	18–9	12–6	T-3rd	—	—	—
1998–99	Nancy Neiber	20–8	12–6	3rd	NCAA Division II First Round	—	—
1999-00	Nancy Neiber	15–6	7–5		—	—	—
Nancy Neiber:		301–140 (.683)	155–107 (.592)				
Aaron Johnston (North Central Conference) (1984–1999)
2000	Aaron Johnston	4–2	4–2	4th	—	—	—
2000–01	Aaron Johnston	15–12	9–9	T-5th	—	—	—
2001–02	Aaron Johnston	28–9	12–6	2nd	NCAA Division II Final 4	—	—
2002–03	Aaron Johnston	32–3	14–2	T-1st	NCAA Division II Champions	—	—
2003–04	Aaron Johnston	26–7	11–3	T-1st	NCAA Division II Elite 8	—	—
Aaron Johnston (Independent Division I) (2004–2007)
2004–05	Aaron Johnston	21–7	—	—	—	—	—
2005–06	Aaron Johnston	19–9	—	—	—	—	—
2006–07	Aaron Johnston	25–6	—	—	WNIT Quarterfinals	—	—
Aaron Johnston (Summit League) (2007–present)
2007–08	Aaron Johnston	23–7	16–2	1st	WNIT First Round	—	—
2008–09	Aaron Johnston	32–3	17–1	1st	NCAA Second Round	16	19
2009–10	Aaron Johnston	22–11	14–4	3rd	NCAA First Round	—	—
2010–11	Aaron Johnston	19–14	12–6	3rd	NCAA First Round	—	—
2011–12	Aaron Johnston	24–9	16–2	1st	NCAA First Round	—	—
2012–13	Aaron Johnston	25–8	14–2	1st	NCAA First Round	—	—
2013–14	Aaron Johnston	26–10	13–1	1st	WNIT Semifinals	—	—
2014–15	Aaron Johnston	24–9	12–4	2nd	NCAA First Round	—	—
2015–16	Aaron Johnston	27–7	13–3	2nd	NCAA Second Round	—	—
2016–17	Aaron Johnston	23–9	12–4	3rd	WNIT Second Round	—	—
2017–18	Aaron Johnston	26–7	12–2	2nd	NCAA First Round	—	—
2018–19	Aaron Johnston	28–7	15–1	2nd	NCAA Sweet Sixteen	—	22
2019–20	Aaron Johnston	23–10	13–3	2nd	—	—	—
2020–21	Aaron Johnston	21–4	14–0	1st	NCAA First Round	25	—
2021–22	Aaron Johnston	29–9	17–1	1st	WNIT Champions	—	—
2022–23	Aaron Johnston	29-6	18–0	1st	NCAA Second Round	—	—
2023–24	Aaron Johnston	27-6	16–0	1st	NCAA First Round	—	—
2024-25	Aaron Johnston	30-4	16–0	1st	NCAA Second Round	23	23
2025-26	Aaron Johnston	27–7	14–2	2nd	NCAA First Round	—	—
Aaron Johnston:		655–202 (.764)	324–60 (.844)				
Total:		1181-470	483-185				
National champion Postseason invitational champion Conference regular season champion Conference regular season and conference tournament champion Division regular season champion Division regular season and conference tournament champion Conference tournament champion

=== NCAA Tournament seeding history ===
The following lists include years in which the Jackrabbits have been seeded in the NCAA tournament.

Years →	'09	'10	'11	'12	'13	'15	'16	'18	'19	'21	'23	'24	'25	'26
Seeds →	7	14	15	13	13	14	12	8	6	9	9	12	10	11

== Arenas ==
- The Barn 1966–1972
- Frost Arena 1973–2024
- First Bank and Trust Arena 2024–present

== Head coaches ==
#	Name	Term	Record (W–L)
1	Norma Boetel	1966–70	35–1
2	Ruth Marske	1970–72	32–4
3	Norma Boetel	1972–73	11–7
4	Jenny Johnson	1973–74	13–4
5	Norma Boetel	1974–76	33–11
6	Cindy Davis	1976–78	28–20
7	Mary Ingram	1978–84	72–84
8	Nancy Neiber	1984–2000	301–140
9	Aaron Johnston	2000–present†	628–195

† Aaron Johnston took over for Nancy Neiber during the last six games of the 1999–2000 season.

- Records though 2024-25 season.

== Media coverage ==
All home and road games are covered on the Jackrabbit Sports Network. The broadcast range of the Jackrabbit Sports Network covers eight states (South Dakota, Minnesota, North Dakota, Iowa, Nebraska, Missouri, Kansas, and Wyoming), and consists of the following stations:

- WNAX 570AM (Flagship Station)
- KJJQ 910AM
- KRKI 99.1FM
- KGFX 1060AM
- KSDR 1480AM

In 2023/2024, the Summit League finalized a three-year official television contract with CBS Sports Network for linear broadcasting, and partnered with Midco to launch the branded Summit League Network for direct-to-consumer viewing.
