= 2026–27 Northern Iowa Panthers women's basketball team =

American college basketball season

2026–27 Northern Iowa Panthers women's basketball
- Conference: Missouri Valley Conference
- Record: 1–4 (0–0 MVC)
- Head coach: Tanya Warren (20th season)
- Associate head coach: Brad Nelson
- Assistant coaches: Katelin Vandevender; Amellia Bromenschenkel; Deidra Johnson
- Home arena: McLeod Center

2026–27 Missouri Valley Conference women's basketball standings
	Conf.				Overall
Team	W		L	PCT	W		L	PCT
Illinois State	0	–	0	–	6	–	0	1.000
UIC	0	–	0	–	3	–	2	.600
Indiana State	0	–	0	–	3	–	3	.500
Bradley	0	–	0	–	2	–	3	.400
Drake	0	–	0	–	2	–	3	.400
Murray State	0	–	0	–	2	–	3	.400
Southern Illinois	0	–	0	–	1	–	3	.250
Belmont	0	–	0	–	1	–	4	.200
Northern Iowa	0	–	0	–	1	–	4	.200
Valparaiso	0	–	0	–	1	–	4	.200
Evansville	0	–	0	–	0	–	5	.000
† 2027 MVC tournament winner As of November 19, 2026

The 2026–27 Northern Iowa Panthers women's basketball team represented the University of Northern Iowa during the 2026–27 NCAA Division I women's basketball season. The Panthers, led by twentieth-year head coach Tanya Warren, played their home games at the McLeod Center in Cedar Falls, Iowa as members of the Missouri Valley Conference (MVC).

== Previous season ==
The Panthers finished the 2025–26 season 18–14, 13–7 in MVC play, to finish in a three way tied for third place. As No. 4 seed in the MVC tournament, they defeated Bradley in the quarterfinals before falling to top-seeded Murray State in the semifinals.

== Offseason ==
=== Departures ===
Northern Iowa departures
Name	Num.	Pos.	Height	Year	Hometown	Reason for departure
Virginia Edmondson	4	G	5'9"	Senior	Richmond, VA	Graduated
Ryley Goebel	5	F	6'0"	Senior	Urbana, IA	Graduated
Taryn Wharton	22	G	5'5"	Senior	Bellevue, NE	Graduated
Bri Robinson	23	G	5'8"	Junior	Lincoln, NE	Transferred to South Dakota

=== Incoming transfers ===
Northern Iowa incoming transfers
Name	Num.	Pos.	Height	Year	Hometown	Previous school
Callie Levin	23	G	5'9"	Junior	Solon, IA	Iowa

=== Recruiting class ===
There was no 2026 recruiting class.

== Preseason ==
On October 13, 2026, the MWC released its annual preseason poll and honor awards. Northern Iowa was picked to finish fourth in the conference, earning one first-place votes.

=== Preseason rankings ===
MVC Preseason Poll
Predicted finish	Team	Votes (1st place)
1	Murray State	477 (41)
2	Illinois State	396
3	Belmont	375 (2)
4	Northern Iowa	343 (1)
5	Drake	317
6	UIC	267

=== Preseason honors ===
"Players to Watch" List
Player	Position	Year	Hometown
Elise Jaeger	F	JR	West Des Moines, IA
Kaylynn Janes	F	JR	St. Louis, MO
Callie Levin	G	JR	Solon, IA
Jenna Twedt	G	SR	Atkins, IA

== Roster ==
2026–27 Northern Iowa Panthers women's basketball team
Players
Coaches

Pos.	#	Name	Height	Year	Previous school	Hometown
G	0	Harper Whetstine	5 ft 9 in (1.75 m)	Fr	Troy High School	Troy, KS
G	1	Emily Larsen	5 ft 11 in (1.8 m)	Fr	Prairie High School	Cedar Rapids, IA
G	2	Abby Tuttle	5 ft 10 in (1.78 m)	So	North Polk High School	Polk City, IA
F	3	Le'Sendra Williams	6 ft 1 in (1.85 m)	Fr	Minnetonka High School	Minnetonka, MN
G	10	Taylor Franck	5 ft 5 in (1.65 m)	Fr	Mount Vernon High School	Mount Vernon, IA
G	11	Mya Nicholson	5 ft 9 in (1.75 m)	Jr	Janesville-Craig High School	Milton, WI
F	12	Anna Greene	6 ft 1 in (1.85 m)	So	Mahtomedi High School	Mahtomedi, MN
F	15	Elise Jaeger	6 ft 1 in (1.85 m)	Jr	Valley High School	West Des Moines, IA
G	20	Jenna Twedt	5 ft 8 in (1.73 m)	Sr	Benton Community High School; Kirkwood Community College	Atkins, IA
G	23	Callie Levin	5 ft 9 in (1.75 m)	Jr	Solon High School; Iowa	Solon, IA
F	24	Maren Schmotzer	6 ft 3 in (1.91 m)	So	Edgewood High School	Madison, WI
G	30	Lauren Walker	5 ft 9 in (1.75 m)	So	Central DeWitt High School	DeWitt, IA
F	32	Callie Oakland	6 ft 1 in (1.85 m)	Fr	St. Croix Lutheran Academy	Cottage Grove, MN
F	34	Kaylynn Janes	6 ft 0 in (1.83 m)	Jr	Incarnate Word Academy	St. Louis, MO

Head coach

- Tanya Warren (Creighton)

Assistant coach(es)

- Brad Nelson (Oregon)
- Katelin Vandevender (Northern Iowa)
- Amellia Bromenschenkel (Purdue Fort Wayne)
- Bridgeport Tusler (Bethel)

Legend

- (C) Team captain
- (S) Suspended
- (I) Ineligible
- (W) Walk-on
- Injured
- Current redshirt

Roster
Last update: November 16, 2026

== Schedule and results ==
Date time, TV	Rank^{#}	Opponent^{#}	Result	Record	High points	High rebounds	High assists	Site (attendance) city, state
Exhibition
October 26, 2026*; 6:00 p.m.		Upper Iowa	W 85–78		–	–	–	McLeod Center; Cedar Falls, IA
Non-conference regular season
November 2, 2026*; 6:00 p.m., ESPN+		St. Thomas	W 67–59	1–0	16 – Tuttle	8 – Jaeger	4 – Tied	McLeod Center (1,935); Cedar Falls, IA
November 6, 2026*; 6:00 p.m., Midco Sports Plus/SLN		at South Dakota State	L 54–76	1–1	18 – Twedt	16 – Jaeger	3 – Tied	First Bank and Trust Arena (2,878); Brookings, SD
November 12, 2026*; 7:30 p.m., BTN		at No. 10т Iowa	L 40–78	1–2	8 – Twedt	7 – Franck	3 – Tuttle	Carver–Hawkeye Arena (13,609); Iowa City, IA
November 15, 2026*; 2:00 p.m., ESPN+		Creighton	L 50–72	1–3	12 – Walker	9 – Jaeger	4 – Jaeger	McLeod Center (2,038); Cedar Falls, IA
November 18, 2026*; 6:00 p.m., ESPN+		Iowa State	L 57–72	1–4	16 – Tuttle	5 – Jaeger	3 – Levin	McLeod Center (3,102); Cedar Falls, IA
November 23, 2026*; 6:00 p.m., ESPN+		Green Bay						McLeod Center; Cedar Falls, IA
November 25, 2026*; 6:00 p.m., ESPN+		Saint Louis						McLeod Center; Cedar Falls, IA
December 3, 2026*; 6:00 p.m., ESPN+		at Kansas State						Bramlage Coliseum; Manhattan, KS
December 6, 2026*; 1:00 p.m., SLN		at North Dakota State						Scheels Center; Fargo, ND
December 9, 2026*; 7:00 p.m., B1G+		at Minnesota						The Barn; Minneapolis, MN
December 12, 2026*; 2:00 p.m., ESPN+		Toledo						McLeod Center; Cedar Falls, IA
MVC regular season
December 20, 2026; 2:00 p.m., ESPN+		Evansville						McLeod Center; Cedar Falls, IA
December 22, 2026; 6:00 p.m., ESPN+		Southern Illinois						McLeod Center; Cedar Falls, IA
December 31, 2026; 2:00 p.m., ESPN+		at Indiana State						Hulman Center; Terre Haute, IN
January 2, 2027; 2:00 p.m., ESPN+		at Valparaiso						Athletics–Recreation Center; Valparaiso, IN
January 7, 2027; 7:00 p.m., ESPN+		at UIC						Credit Union 1 Arena; Chicago, IL
January 9, 2027; 2:00 p.m., ESPN+		at Illinois State						CEFCU Arena; Normal IL
January 14, 2027; 6:00 p.m., ESPN+		Belmont						McLeod Center; Cedar Falls, IA
January 16, 2027; 2:00 p.m., ESPN+		Murray State						McLeod Center; Cedar Falls, IA
January 19, 2027; 6:00 p.m., ESPN+		at Belmont						Renaissance Coliseum; Peoria IL
January 22, 2027; 6:00 p.m., ESPN+		UIC						McLeod Center; Cedar Falls, IA
January 24, 2027; 2:00 p.m., ESPN+		Indiana State						McLeod Center; Cedar Falls, IA
January 31, 2027; 2:00 p.m., ESPN+		Drake; Rivalry						McLeod Center; Cedar Falls, IA
February 5, 2027; 6:00 p.m., ESPN+		at Murray State						CFSB Center; Murray, KY
February 7, 2027; 2:00 p.m., ESPN+		at Southern Illinois						Banterra Center; Carbondale, IL
February 11, 2027; 6:00 p.m., ESPN+		at Evansville						Meeks Family Fieldhouse; Evansville, IN
February 13, 2027; 4:00 p.m., ESPN+		at Belmont						Curb Events Center; Nashville, TN
January 19, 2027; 6:00 p.m., ESPN+		Valparaiso						McLeod Center; Cedar Falls, IA
January 21, 2027; 4:00 p.m., ESPN+		Illinois State						McLeod Center; Cedar Falls, IA
January 25, 2027; 6:00 p.m., ESPN+		Illinois State						McLeod Center; Cedar Falls, IA
February 27, 2027; 2:00 p.m., ESPN+		at Drake; Rivalry						Knapp Center; Des Moines, IA
MVC tournament
March 3–7, 2027; TBA		vs.						Enterprise Center; St. Louis, MO
*Non-conference game. ^{#}Rankings from AP poll. (#) Tournament seedings in parentheses. All times are in Central.
