= Allison Pohlman =

American collegiate basketball coach

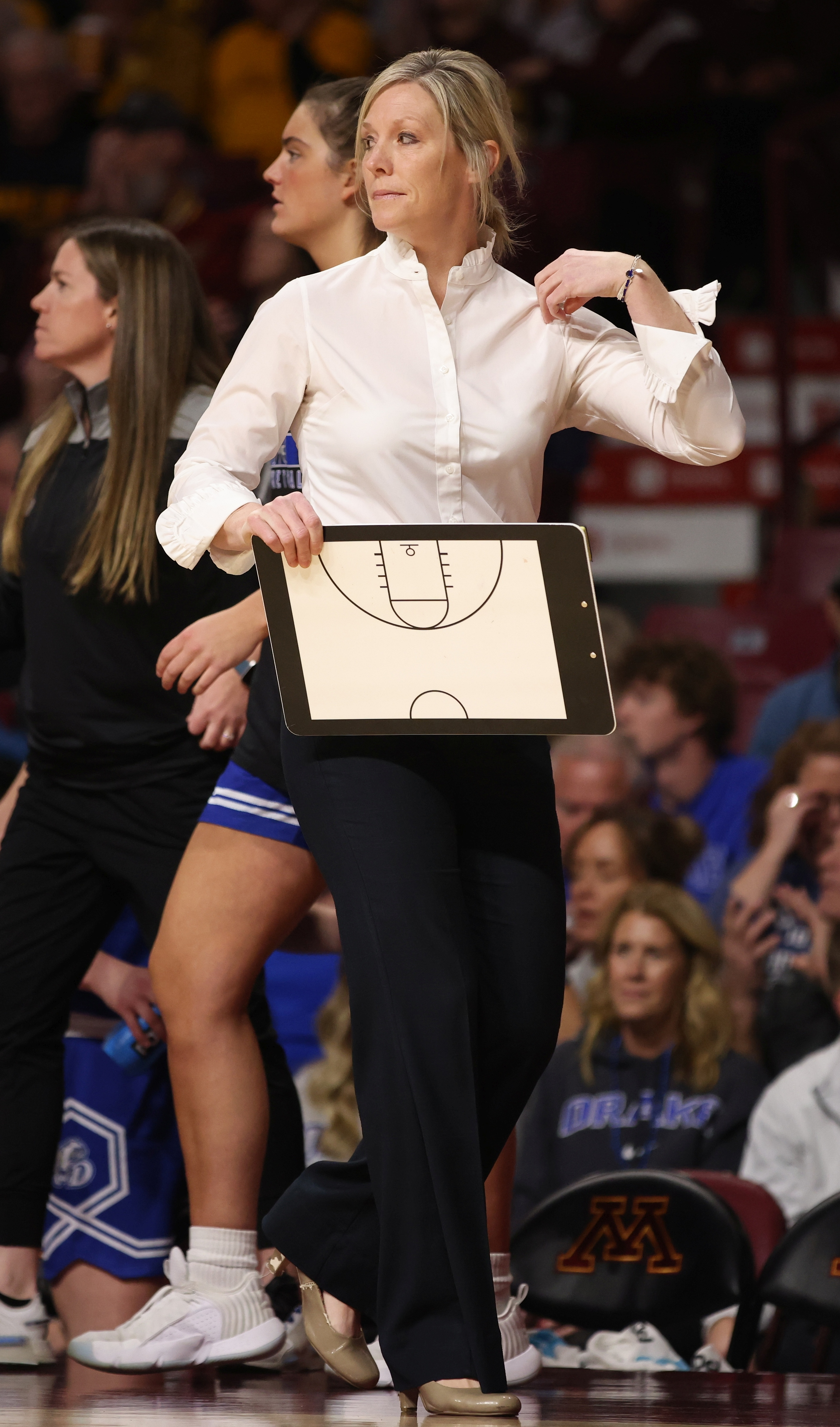
- Pohlman in 2023

Current position
- Title: Head coach
- Team: Drake
- Conference: MVC
- Record: 105–62 (.629)

Biographical details
- Born: October 6, 1977 (age 49); Wellsburg, Iowa, U.S.
- Education: University of Northern Iowa

Playing career
- 1996–2000: Northern Iowa
- Position: Small forward

Coaching career (HC unless noted)
- 2001–2006: Northern Iowa (assistant)
- 2006–2007: Northern Iowa (associate)
- 2007–2014: Drake (assistant)
- 2014–2021: Drake (associate)
- 2021–present: Drake

Head coaching record
- Overall: 105–62 (.629)

Accomplishments and honors

Records
- MVC Coach of the Year (2024)

Allison Pohlman (née Starr; born October 6, 1977) is an American basketball coach and the current head coach of the Drake Bulldogs women's basketball team. She took over the position in April 2021, following Jennie Baranczyk's hiring at Oklahoma. Pohlman had been an associate head coach and assistant coach at Drake since 2007. Prior to Drake, she was an assistant coach at Northern Iowa, her alma mater, and served as associate head coach there from 2006 to 2007.

== Playing career ==
A Wellsburg, Iowa native, playing at Northern Iowa, Pohlman was named to the Missouri Valley Conference's All-Freshman team and, in the three successive seasons, she was named All-MVC First Team and to the conference's All-Defensive Team. She finished her playing career with 1,463 points, 711 rebounds, and 274 steals. In 2011, she was inducted into the UNI Hall of Fame.

== Coaching career ==
Pohlman began her coaching career as a graduate assistant at Northern Iowa for the 2000–01 season, before being promoted to an assistant coach the following season and associate head coach in 2006. She joined Drake prior to the 2007–08 season. When Baranczyk was named the head coach at Drake in 2012, she retained Pohlman and promoted her to associate head coach in 2014. Pohlman was also recruiting coordinator for Drake. She was promoted to head coach in April 2021. In 2024, she was named Coach of the Year in the Missouri Valley Conference.

== Head coaching record ==
Record table
Season	Team	Overall	Conference	Standing	Postseason
Drake Bulldogs (Missouri Valley Conference) (2021–present)
2021–22	Drake	20–14	9–9	T–6th	WNIT Super Sixteen
2022–23	Drake	22–10	14–6	T–4th	NCAA First Round
2023–24	Drake	29–6	19–1	1st	NCAA First Round
2024–25	Drake	22–12	15–5	T–2nd	WBIT First Round
2025–26	Drake	12–20	10–10	6th	
2026–27	Drake	0–0	0–0		
Drake:		105–62 (.629)	67–31 (.684)		
Total:		105–62 (.629)			
National champion Postseason invitational champion Conference regular season champion Conference regular season and conference tournament champion Division regular season champion Division regular season and conference tournament champion Conference tournament champion

== Personal life ==
Pohlman and her husband Kirk are the parents of triplet daughters, Quinn, Rubie and Sidny, born July 30, 2006.
