= 2018 Summit League women's basketball tournament =

- Classification: Division I
- Season: 2017–18
- Teams: 8
- Site: Denny Sanford Premier Center; Sioux Falls, South Dakota
- Champions: South Dakota State (8th title)
- Winning coach: Aaron Johnston (8th title)
- Attendance: 27,054
- Television: Midco Sport Network; ESPNU

2017–18 Summit League women's basketball standings
	Conf.				Overall
Team	W		L	PCT	W		L	PCT
South Dakota	14	–	0	1.000	29	–	7	.806
South Dakota State †	12	–	2	.857	26	–	7	.788
Western Illinois	10	–	4	.714	22	–	10	.688
Oral Roberts	7	–	7	.500	17	–	13	.567
Denver	7	–	7	.500	16	–	14	.533
Omaha	3	–	11	.214	12	–	16	.429
North Dakota State	2	–	12	.143	9	–	20	.310
Fort Wayne	1	–	13	.071	4	–	24	.143
† 2018 Summit League Tournament winner As of March 25, 2018; Rankings from AP Poll

The 2018 Summit League women's basketball tournament was a post-season women's basketball tournament for The Summit League. The tournament took place March 3–6, 2018, at the Denny Sanford Premier Center in Sioux Falls, South Dakota. The Top 8 teams in the final standings qualified for the tournament.

== Seeds ==
Seed	School	Conference	Overall	Tiebreaker #1	Tiebreaker #2	Tiebreaker #3
1	South Dakota	14–0	26–5			
2	South Dakota State	12–2	24–6			
3	Western Illinois	10–4	22–8			
4	Denver	7–7	16–14	1–1 vs. ORU	0–2 vs. each of USD, SDSU, and WIU; 2–0 vs. each of Omaha, NDSU, and FW	RPI: 170
5	Oral Roberts	7–7	17–13	1–1 vs. DU	0–2 vs. each of USD, SDSU, and WIU; 2–0 vs. each of Omaha, NDSU, and FW	RPI: 179
6	Omaha	3–11	12–16			
7	North Dakota State	2–12	9–20			
8	Fort Wayne	1–13	4–24			

== Schedule ==
Session	Game	Time*	Matchup^{#}	Score	Television
Quarterfinals – Saturday, March 3
1	1	12:00 PM	#1 South Dakota vs #8 Fort Wayne	83–32	Midco Sport Network/ESPN3
1	2	2:30 PM	#2 South Dakota State vs #7 North Dakota State	87–62	Midco Sport Network/ESPN3
Quarterfinals – Sunday, March 4
2	3	12:00 PM	#4 Denver vs #5 Oral Roberts	71–76	Midco Sport Network/ESPN3
2	4	2:30 PM	#3 Western Illinois vs #6 Omaha	97–57	Midco Sport Network/ESPN3
Semifinals – Monday, March 5
3	5	12:00 PM	#1 South Dakota vs #5 Oral Roberts	65–53	Midco Sport Network/ESPN3
3	6	2:30 PM	#2 South Dakota State vs #3 Western Illinois	80–51	Midco Sport Network/ESPN3
Championship – Tuesday, March 6
7	9	1:00 PM	#1 South Dakota vs #2 South Dakota State	50–65	ESPNU
*Game times in CT. #-Rankings denote tournament seed

== Bracket ==
Quarterfinals; March 3–4; Midco Sports Network
1	South Dakota	83
8	Fort Wayne	32
4	Denver	71
5	Oral Roberts	76
2	South Dakota State	87
7	North Dakota State	62
3	Western Illinois	97
6	Omaha	57

Semifinals; March 5 Midco Sports Network
1	South Dakota	65
5	Oral Roberts	53
2	South Dakota State	80
3	Western Illinois	51

Finals; March 6 ESPNU
1	South Dakota	50
2	South Dakota State	65

== See also ==
- 2018 Summit League men's basketball tournament
