= 2026–27 Summit League women's basketball season =

- League: NCAA Division I
- Sport: Basketball
- Teams: 8
- TV partner(s): Summit League Network, CBS Sports Network

Regular season

Summit League tournament

Summit League women's basketball seasons
- ← 2025–26 2027–28 →

2026–27 Summit League women's basketball standings
	Conf.				Overall
Team	W		L	PCT	W		L	PCT
Kansas City	0	–	0	–	1	–	0	1.000
South Dakota	0	–	0	–	1	–	0	1.000
North Dakota	0	–	0	–	0	–	1	.000
North Dakota State	0	–	0	–	0	–	1	.000
Omaha	0	–	0	–	0	–	1	.000
Oral Roberts	0	–	0	–	0	–	1	.000
St. Thomas	0	–	0	–	0	–	1	.000
South Dakota State	0	–	0	–	0	–	1	.000
† 2027 Summit League tournament winner As of November 5, 2026

The 2026–27 Summit League women's basketball season began non-conference play on November 2, 2026, and conference play will start on January 7, 2027. The regular season will conclude on February 27, 2027 and setup the 2027 Summit League women's basketball tournament from March 4 to 7, 2027.

== Preseason ==
The preseason Summit League women's basketball poll and awards were released on October 6, 2026.

=== Preseason poll ===
First place votes in parenthesis

1. North Dakota State (24) – 456
2. South Dakota State (8) – 429
3. South Dakota – 359
4. St. Thomas – 283
5. Oral Roberts – 253
6. Kansas City – 212
7. Omaha – 151
8. North Dakota – 121

=== Preseason awards ===
Honor	Recipient
Preseason Player of the Year	Avery Koenen, North Dakota State
Preseason All-Summit League First Team	Elauni Bennett, Kansas City
Preseason All-Summit League First Team	Marisa Frost, North Dakota State
Preseason All-Summit League First Team	Avery Koenen, North Dakota State
Preseason All-Summit League First Team	Molly Joyce, South Dakota
Preseason All-Summit League First Team	Alyssa Sand, St. Thomas
Preseason All-Summit League First Team	Jocelyn Schiller, North Dakota State
Preseason All-Summit League Second Team	Karrington Asp, North Dakota State
Preseason All-Summit League Second Team	Emani Bennett, Kansas City
Preseason All-Summit League Second Team	Emilee Fox, Kansas City
Preseason All-Summit League Second Team	Hadley Thul, South Dakota State
Preseason All-Summit League Second Team	Katie Vasecka, South Dakota State

== Regular season ==
=== Records against other conferences ===
2026–27 records against non-conference foes as of November 2, 2026:

Major 6 Conferences	Record	Major 6 Conferences	Record
ACC	None	American	None
Big East	0–1	Big Ten	None
Big 12	0–2	SEC	None
Major 6 Total			0–3
Other Division I Conferences	Record	Other Division I Conferences	Record
Atlantic 10	None	ASUN	None
America East	None	Big Sky	None
Big South	None	Big West	None
CAA	None	Conference USA	None
Horizon League	None	Ivy League	None
Independents	None	MAAC	None
MAC	None	MEAC	None
MVC	0–1	MWC	None
NEC	None	OVC	None
Pac-12	0–1	Patriot League	None
SoCon	None	Southland	None
SWAC	None	Sun Belt	None
UAC	None	WCC	None
Other Division I Total			0–2
NCAA Division I Total			0–5
NCAA Division II Total			0–1
NCAA Division III Total			0–0
NAIA Total			2–0
NCCAA Total			0–0
Total Non-Conference Record			2–6

=== Record against ranked non-conference opponents ===
This will be a list of games against ranked opponents only: Summit League teams in bold

Date	Visitor	Home	Site	Score	Conference record	Ref
November 3, 2026	**Oral Roberts**	No. 15 TCU	Schollmaier Arena; Fort Worth, TX	**L 43**–99	**0–1**	

Team rankings are reflective of AP poll

† denotes game was played at neutral site
^ denotes NCAA tournament game

=== Conference matrix ===
	Kansas City	North Dakota	North Dakota State	Omaha	Oral Roberts	St. Thomas	South Dakota	South Dakota State
vs. Kansas City	–	–	–	–	–	–	–	–
vs. North Dakota	–	–	–	–	–	–	–	–
vs. North Dakota State	–	–	–	–	–	–	–	–
vs. Omaha	–	–	–	–	–	–	–	–
vs. Oral Roberts	–	–	–	–	–	–	–	–
vs. St. Thomas	–	–	–	–	–	–	–	–
vs. South Dakota	–	–	–	–	–	–	–	–
vs. South Dakota State	–	–	–	–	–	–	–	–
Total	0–0	0–0	0–0	0–0	0–0	0–0	0–0	0–0

Through October 18, 2026

=== Points scored ===
Team	For	Against	Difference
Kansas City	0	0	–
North Dakota	0	0	–
North Dakota State	0	0	–
Omaha	0	0	–
Oral Roberts	0	0	–
St. Thomas	0	0	–
South Dakota	0	0	–
South Dakota State	0	0	–

Through October 18, 2026

=== National Television Games ===
Any games that league members will play on National Television, including the Summit League's media contract with CBS Sports Network, will be listed here.

Summit League members in bold

Date Time (CT)	Road Team	Home team	Final Score	Network
November 15; 1:00 PM	Oklahoma State	**South Dakota State**	–	CBSSN
February 7; 1:00 PM	**North Dakota State**	**St. Thomas**	–	CBSSN

=== Home attendance ===
Team	Arena	Capacity	Total Games	Average Attendance	Attendance High	Total Attendance	% of Capacity
Kansas City	Swinney Recreation Center	1,500	1	702		702	46.8%
North Dakota	Betty Engelstad Sioux Center	3,300	1	1,304		1,304	39.5%
North Dakota State	Scheels Center	5,460					%
Omaha	Baxter Arena	7,898					%
Oral Roberts	Mabee Center	10,154					%
St. Thomas	Lee and Penny Anderson Arena	5,300					%
South Dakota	Sanford Coyote Sports Center	6,000	1	1,395		1,395	23.3%
South Dakota State	First Bank and Trust Arena	6,500	1	2,453		2,453	37.7%

Bold - Exceed capacity
As of November 2, 2026
Does not include exhibition games

== Head coaches ==
=== Coaching changes ===
==== Kansas City ====
On March 6, 2026, Dionnah Jackson-Durrett was let go from her position as head coach of the Roos after four seasons with the program. Then, on March 11, 2026, Candi Whitaker was named the next head coach in Kansas City. This is Whitaker's second head coaching stint with the Roos, having last coached them from 2006–12.

==== St. Thomas ====
On February 10, 2026, Ruth Sinn announced she would be retiring from coaching at the conclusion of the 2025–26 season after leading the Tommies for 21 years. Later, on March 25, 2026, Mandy Pearson was named the next head coach at St. Thomas.

=== Coaches ===
Note: Stats shown are before the beginning of the season. Overall and Summit League records are from time at current school.

Team	Head coach	Previous job	Seasons at school	Overall record (Note: Overall and Summit League records, conference titles, etc. are from time at current school and are through the end the 2025–26 season.)	Summit record	Summit titles	NCAA tournaments	NCAA Sweet Sixteen	NCAA Championships
Kansas City	Candi Whitaker	North Alabama	7th (Note: Previously coached for Kansas City from 2006–12)	77–93 (.453)	43–56 (.434)	0	2 (Note: 2 Division II tournaments with Missouri Western)	1 (Note: 1 Division II Sweet 16 and Elite 8 with Missouri Western)	0
North Dakota	Dennis Hutter	North Dakota (associate HC)	2nd	7–24 (.226)	3–13 (.188)	0	0	0	0
North Dakota State	Jory Collins	Kansas (assistant)	7th	127–87 (.593)	64-42 (.604)	0	0	0	0
Omaha	Jamie Carey	UTSA (associate HC)	2nd	6–27 (.182)	3–13 (.188)	0	0	0	0
Oral Roberts	Cophie Anderson	Oral Roberts (associate HC)	1st	15–15 (.500)	8–8 (.500)	0	0	0	0
St. Thomas	Mandy Pearson	Minnesota–Duluth	1st	0–0 (–)	0–0 (–)	0	4 (Note: 4 NCAA Division II tournament appearances)	1 (Note: 1 NCAA Division II championship game appearance)	0
South Dakota	Carrie Eighmey	Idaho	3rd	37–29 (.561)	17–15 (.531)	0	0	0	0
South Dakota State	Aaron Johnston	South Dakota State (assistant)	27th	655–202 (.764)	274–36 (.884)	13	14	1	0

== Awards and honors ==
=== Players of the week ===
Throughout the regular season, the Summit League offices will name one or two players of the week each Monday.

Week	Player(s) of the Week	School

== Postseason ==
=== Summit League tournament ===
All 8 teams will qualify for the Summit League tournament. It will be held at the Denny Sanford Premier Center in Sioux Falls, South Dakota from March 4 to March 7, 2027.

Quarterfinals; March 4 & 5 MidcoSN/SLN
1
8
4
5
2
7
3
6

Semifinals; March 6 MidcoSN/SLN

Championship; March 7 CBS Sports Network

== Related ==
- 2026–27 Summit League men's basketball season
