= 2002–03 South Dakota State Jackrabbits women's basketball team =

Intercollegiate basketball season

2002–03 South Dakota State Jackrabbits women's basketball

NCAA Division II National Champions
- Conference: North Central Conference
- Record: 32–3 (14–2 NCC)
- Head coach: Aaron Johnston (3rd season)
- Assistant coach: Laurie Melum (3rd season)
- Home arena: Frost Arena

The 2002–03 South Dakota State Jackrabbits women's basketball team represented South Dakota State University in the 2002–03 NCAA Division II women's basketball season. The Jackrabbits, led by third-year head coach Aaron Johnston, played their home games in Frost Arena in Brookings, South Dakota, as a member of the NCC. They finished the season tied for first place in the NCC, losing in the second game of the conference tournament. However, the Jackrabbits won all six of their NCAA tournament games, claiming the NCAA D–II Championship over Northern Kentucky, 65–50.

== Roster ==
2002–03 South Dakota State Jackrabbits women's basketball team
Players
Coaches

Pos.	#	Name	Height	Year	Previous school	Hometown
G/F	10	Stacie Cizek	5 ft 10 in (1.78 m)	Jr	Millard South High School	Omaha, NE
G	12	Stephanie Bolden	5 ft 6 in (1.68 m)	So	Marshall High School	Marshal, MN
G/F	14	Brenda Davis	5 ft 11 in (1.8 m)	Jr	Tri-Valley High School	Colton, SD
G	20	Heather Sieler	5 ft 6 in (1.68 m)	Fr	Huron High School	Huron, SD
G	24	Megan Otte	5 ft 8 in (1.73 m)	So	Grand Island Senior High School	Grand Island, NE
G/F	30	Brooke Dickmeyer	5 ft 9 in (1.75 m)	So	Washington High School	Sioux Falls, SD
F	34	Melissa Prater	5 ft 11 in (1.8 m)	Sr	Southwest Christian High School	Holland, MN
G	40	Dianna Pavek	5 ft 8 in (1.73 m)	So	Lincoln H-I High School	Ivanhoe, MN
F/C	42	Shannon Schlagel	6 ft 0 in (1.83 m)	So	Clark Junior-Senior High School	Raymond, SD
C	50	Karly Hegge	6 ft 1 in (1.85 m)	Sr	Baltic High School	Baltic, SD
C	52	Sarita DeBoer	6 ft 2 in (1.88 m)	So	Huron High School	Huron, SD
C	54	Christina Gilbert	6 ft 2 in (1.88 m)	Fr	Stillwater Area High School	Stillwater, MN

Head coach

- Aaron Johnston (Gustavus Adolphus)

Assistant coach(es)

- Laurie Melum (Augustana)

Legend

- (C) Team captain
- (S) Suspended
- (I) Ineligible
- (W) Walk-on
- Injured
- Current redshirt

Roster

== Schedule ==
Date time, TV	Rank^{#}	Opponent^{#}	Result	Record	Site (attendance) city, state
Regular season
November 22, 2002*	No. 3	Sioux Falls	W 91–67	1–0	Frost Arena (1,618); Brookings, SD
November 23, 2002*; 7:00 p.m.	No. 3	Concordia–St. Paul	W 100–70	2–0	Frost Arena (1,227); Brookings, SD
November 29, 2002*; 5:00 p.m.	No. 3	vs. Briar Cliff (Ia.); UNK Holiday Inn/Captain's Table Thanksgiving Tournament	W 101–46	3–0	(250); Kearney, NE
November 30, 2002*; 7:00 p.m.	No. 3	vs. Nebraska–Kearney; UNK Holiday Inn/Captain's Table Thanksgiving Tournament	W 82–59	4–0	Health and Sports Center (1,150); Kearney, NE
December 6, 2002*; 7:00 p.m.	No. 3	at Bemidji State (Minn.)	W 85–67	5–0	BSU Gymnasium (182); Bemidji, MN
December 7, 2002*; 7:00 p.m.	No. 3	at MSU–Moorhead	W 86–63	6–0	Alex Nemzek Fieldhouse (312); Moorhead, MN
December 10, 2002*; 7:00 p.m.	No. 3	Winona State (Minn.)	W 89–57	7–0	Frost Arena (1,189); Brookings, SD
December 14, 2002*; 5:30 p.m.	No. 3	at Northern State	W 95–45	8–0	Wachs Arena (3,682); Aberdeen, SD
December 20, 2002*; 6:00 p.m.	No. 1	Chadron State	W 110–60	9–0	Frost Arena (712); Brookings, SD
December 21, 2002*; 7:00 p.m.	No. 1	No. 22 Wisconsin–Eau Claire	W 73–59	10–0	Frost Arena (1,023); Brookings, SD
December 30, 2002*; 7:00 p.m.	No. 1	Dakota Wesleyan	W 90–46	11–0	Frost Arena (1,277); Brookings, SD
January 1, 2003; 6:00 p.m.	No. 1	at Minnesota State	W 99–65	12–0 (1–0)	Bresnan Arena (802); Mankato, MN
January 10, 2003	No. 1	at North Dakota State	W 77–72	13–0 (2–0)	Bison Sports Arena (4,075); Fargo, ND
January 11, 2003; 6:00 p.m.	No. 1	at St. Cloud State	W 75–54	14–0 (3–0)	Halenbeck Hall (2,248); St. Cloud, MN
January 16, 2003; 6:00 p.m.	No. 1	No. 12 South Dakota	W 86–69	15–0 (4–0)	Frost Arena (7,814); Brookings, SD
January 18, 2003; 6:00 p.m.	No. 1	at Nebraska–Omaha	W 95–74	16–0 (5–0)	Sapp Fieldhouse (2,200); Omaha, NE
January 24, 2003; 6:00 p.m.	No. 1	St. Cloud	W 83–63	17–0 (6–0)	Frost Arena (2,734); Brookings, SD
January 25, 2003; 6:00 p.m.	No. 1	No. 5 North Dakota	W 78–62	18–0 (7–0)	Frost Arena (4,032); Brookings, SD
January 30, 2003; 6:00 p.m.	No. 1	at Augustana	W 74–54	19–0 (8–0)	Sioux Falls Arena (3,507); Sioux Falls, SD
February 6, 2003; 6:00 p.m.	No. 1	at No. 7 North Dakota	L 62–86	19–1 (8–1)	Hyslop Sports Center (3,041); Grand Forks, ND
February 8, 2003; 6:00 p.m.	No. 1	No. 5 North Dakota State	W 77–47	20–1 (9–1)	Frost Arena (4,674); Brookings, SD
February 13, 2003; 5:30 p.m.	No. 2	at Northern Colorado	W 71–59	21–1 (10–1)	Butler-Hancock Hall (582); Greeley, CO
February 15, 2003; 6:00 p.m.	No. 2	at No. 17 South Dakota	L 83–87	21–2 (10–2)	Dakota Dome (7,777); Vermillion, SD
February 20, 2003; 6:00 p.m.	No. 5	Augustana College	W 101–66	22–2 (11–2)	Frost Arena (2,163); Brookings, SD
February 22, 2003; 6:00 p.m.	No. 4	Minnesota State	W 101–51	23–2 (12–2)	Frost Arena (2,581); Brookings, SD
February 28, 2003; 6:00 p.m.	No. 4	Nebraska–Omaha	W 96–62	24–2 (13–2)	Frost Arena (2,079); Brookings, SD
March 1, 2003; 6:00 p.m.	No. 4	Northern Colorado	W 77–59	25–2 (14–2)	Frost Arena (1,634); Brookings, SD
NCC Wells Fargo Tournament
March 7, 2003; 8:00 p.m.		North Dakota State; Wells Fargo Finals Semifinal game	W 87–67	26–2	Frost Arena (2,791); Brookings, SD
March 8, 2003; 7:00 p.m.		North Dakota; Wells Fargo Finals Championship Game	L 87–90	26–3	Frost Arena (3,014); Brookings, SD
NCAA Division II Tournament
March 14, 2003*; 8:00 p.m.		Regis (Colo.); NCAA D–II First Round	W 107–71	27–3	Frost Arena (2,536); Brookings, SD
March 15, 2003*; 8:00 p.m.		North Dakota; NCAA D–II Second Round	W 77–56	28–3	Frost Arena (3,837); Brookings, SD
March 17, 2003*; 7:00 p.m.		South Dakota; NCAA D–II North Central Regional Championship	W 87–63	29–3	Frost Arena (4,237); Brookings, SD
March 26, 2003*; 8:00 p.m.		vs. Cal State Bakersfield; NCAA D–II Elite 8	W 83–62	30–3	St. Joseph Civic Arena (2,125); St. Joseph, MO
March 27, 2003*; 8:00 p.m.		vs. Bentley College; NCAA D–II Elite 8 Semifinal	W 69–62 ^{OT}	31–3	St. Joseph Civic Arena (2,444); St. Joseph, MO
March 29, 2003*; 5:00 p.m.		vs. Northern Kentucky; NCAA D–II Women's National Championship Game	W 65–50	32–3	St. Joseph Civic Arena (2,556); St. Joseph, MO
*Non-conference game. ^{#}Rankings from AP Poll. (#) Tournament seedings in parentheses. All times are in Central Time.
