= 2026–27 Valparaiso Beacons women's basketball team =

American college basketball season

2026–27 Valparaiso Beacons women's basketball
- Conference: Missouri Valley Conference
- Record: 1–4 (0–0 MVC)
- Head coach: Courtney Boyd (2nd season)
- Assistant coach: Brooke Bailey
- Home arena: Athletics–Recreation Center

2026–27 Missouri Valley Conference women's basketball standings
	Conf.				Overall
Team	W		L	PCT	W		L	PCT
Illinois State	0	–	0	–	5	–	0	1.000
UIC	0	–	0	–	3	–	2	.600
Bradley	0	–	0	–	2	–	2	.500
Drake	0	–	0	–	2	–	2	.500
Murray State	0	–	0	–	2	–	2	.500
Indiana State	0	–	0	–	2	–	3	.400
Belmont	0	–	0	–	1	–	3	.250
Northern Iowa	0	–	0	–	1	–	3	.250
Valparaiso	0	–	0	–	1	–	4	.200
Southern Illinois	0	–	0	–	0	–	3	.000
Evansville	0	–	0	–	0	–	4	.000
† 2027 MVC tournament winner As of 16 November 202600

The 2026–27 Valparaiso Beacons women's basketball team represents Valparaiso University during the 2026–27 NCAA Division I women's basketball season. The Beacons, who are led by second-year head coach Courtney Boyd, play their home games at the Athletics–Recreation Center in Valparaiso, Indiana as members of the Missouri Valley Conference.

== Previous Season ==
The Beacons finished their previous season with a conference record of 0–20 and an overall final record of 0–32, the worst in NCAA college basketball history (men's or women's). They finished last place in their conference, expectantly, and lost to Drake in the first round of the conference tournament.

== Preseason ==
=== Preseason Rankings ===
The Beacons were not ranked within the top six spots of the preseason poll, which were the only rankings revealed by the conference.

MVC Preseason Poll
Predicted finish	Team	Votes (1st place)
1	Murray State	477 (41)
2	Illinois State	396
3	Belmont	375 (2)
4	Northern Iowa	343 (1)
5	Drake	317
6	UIC	267

=== Preseason Honors ===
"Players to Watch" List
Player	Position	Year	Hometown
Maci Rhoades	G	GS	Beavercreek, OH
Allia von Schlegell	G	SO	Downers Grove, IL

== Roster ==
2026–27 Valparaiso Beacons women's basketball team
Players
Coaches

Pos.	#	Name	Height	Year	Previous school	Hometown
G	1	Allia von Schlegell	5 ft 5 in (1.65 m)	So	Nazareth Academy	Downers Grove, IL
G	2	Maci Rhoades	5 ft 11 in (1.8 m)	GS	Radford	Beavercreek, OH
G	3	Isabella Anderson	5 ft 7 in (1.7 m)	So	Milbank HS	Milbank, SD
G	4	Constanza Aravena	5 ft 7 in (1.7 m)	So	Miami Dade College	Concepcion, Chile
G	5	Raeven Raye-Redmond	5 ft 6 in (1.68 m)	RS Jr	Trotwood-Madison HS	Trotwood, OH
G	10	Autumn Dibb	5 ft 10 in (1.78 m)	So	Muskego HS	Muskego, WI
G	11	Jana Nogués	5 ft 7 in (1.7 m)	Fr	Escola Sant Gervasi	Barcelona, Spain
C	13	Osadebamwen Igbinedion Omoruyi	6 ft 4 in (1.93 m)	Jr	UTEP	Madrid, Spain
G	14	Maddie Vejsicky	6 ft 0 in (1.83 m)	GS	Akron	New Concord, OH
G	20	Kylee Norkus	5 ft 10 in (1.78 m)	RS So	Evansville	Naperville, IL
G/F	22	Nuala Connolly	5 ft 11 in (1.8 m)	RS Fr	Western Reserve	South Burlington, VT
F	24	Denza Allen	6 ft 1 in (1.85 m)	RS Fr	Big Walnut HS	Sunbury, OH
G	25	Dani Guedet	6 ft 0 in (1.83 m)	Fr	Washington HS	Washington, IL
F	44	Hillary Offing	5 ft 11 in (1.8 m)	RS Jr	Purdue Fort Wayne	Irmo, SC

Head coach

- Courtney Boyd (Utah Tech)

Assistant coach(es)

- Brooke Bailey (Truman State)
- Jasmine Hackett (Sioux Falls)
- Andrew Whitt (Ohio)
- Dale Linderwell (Iowa Wesleyan)

Legend

- (C) Team captain
- (S) Suspended
- (I) Ineligible
- (W) Walk-on
- Injured
- Current redshirt

Roster
Last update: November 1, 2026

== Schedule and Results ==
Date time, TV	Rank^{#}	Opponent^{#}	Result	Record	High points	High rebounds	High assists	Site (attendance) city, state
Exhibition
October 26, 2026*; 6:00 pm		Judson	W 82–43	–	– –	– –	– –	Athletics-Recreation Center; Valparaiso, IN
Non-Conference Regular Season
November 3, 2026*; 5:30 pm, B1G+		at No. RV Michigan State	L 44–98	0–1	9 – von Schlegell	5 – von Schlegell	3 – Guedet	Breslin Center (2,638); East Lansing, MI
November 7, 2026*; 1:00 pm, ESPN+		Detroit Mercy	L 63–67	0–2	17 – Offing	8 – Rhoades	3 – Tied	Athletics-Recreation Center (455); Valparaiso, IN
November 10, 2026*; 11:00 am, ESPN+		Culver-Stockton	W 89–47	1–2	15 – Guedet	13 – Allen	6 – Aravena	Athletics-Recreation Center (886); Valparaiso, IN
November 13, 2026*; 10:00 am, ESPN+		at Purdue Fort Wayne	L 64–75	1–3	13 – Igbinedion Omoruyi	11 – Rhoades	4 – Rhoades	Hilliard Gates Sports Center (848); Fort Wayne, IN
November 15, 2026*; 1:00 pm, ESPN+		at Toledo	L 53–63	1–4	14 – Nogués	7 – Igbinedion Omoruyi	4 – Tied	Savage Arena (4,019); Toledo, OH
November 20, 2026*; 6:00 pm, ESPN+		South Dakota						Athletics-Recreation Center; Valparaiso, IN
November 22, 2026*; 1:00 pm, ESPN+		at SIU Edwardsville						Vadalabene Center; Edwardsville, IL
*Non-conference game. ^{#}Rankings from AP poll. (#) Tournament seedings in parentheses. All times are in Central.

== See also ==
- 2026–27 Valparaiso Beacons men's basketball team
