= 2026–27 South Dakota State Jackrabbits women's basketball team =

Intercollegiate basketball season

2026–27 South Dakota State Jackrabbits women's basketball
- Conference: Summit League
- Record: 2–3 (0–0 Summit)
- Head coach: Aaron Johnston (27th full, 28th overall season)
- Associate head coach: Sadie Thramer (6th year)
- Assistant coaches: Macy Stanage (3rd season); Kacie Jones (3rd season); Shelby Selland (6th season); Erika Sage (6th season)
- Home arena: First Bank and Trust Arena

2026–27 Summit League women's basketball standings
	Conf.				Overall
Team	W		L	PCT	W		L	PCT
South Dakota	0	–	0	–	5	–	1	.833
St. Thomas	0	–	0	–	3	–	2	.600
Kansas City	0	–	0	–	3	–	3	.500
Oral Roberts	0	–	0	–	3	–	4	.429
North Dakota State	0	–	0	–	2	–	3	.400
Omaha	0	–	0	–	2	–	3	.400
South Dakota State	0	–	0	–	2	–	3	.400
North Dakota	0	–	0	–	1	–	4	.200
† 2027 Summit League tournament winner As of November 22, 2026

The 2026–27 South Dakota State Jackrabbits women's basketball represents South Dakota State University in the 2026–27 NCAA Division I women's basketball season. The Jackrabbits are led by twenty-seventh-year head coach Aaron Johnston, and compete in the Summit League. They will play their home games in First Bank and Trust Arena in Brookings, South Dakota.

== Previous season ==
The Jacks finished the season with a 27–7 overall record, 14–2 in Summit League play, finishing second. As the No. 2 seed in the Summit League tournament, their first game was in the quarterfinals against No. 7 seed Kansas City, whom they beat 75–61. The Jacks next game was in the semifinals against No. 3 seed and rival South Dakota. They beat the Coyotes 74–59, making it to the championship game for the 5th straight year, winning the last three. The Jacks faced the No. 1 seed North Dakota State. They beat the Bison 64–51, earning the Jacks a fourth straight Summit League Conference championship and an automatic bid to the NCAA tournament. Brooklyn Meyer won the conference tournament MVP. The Jacks earned an No. 11 seed in the Sacramento #4 against No. 6 seed Washington in Fort Worth, Texas. Their tournament appearance was short, losing their first round game 54–72.

=== Departures ===
Name	Number	Pos.	Height	Year	Hometown	Reason for departure
Madison Mathiowetz	3	G	5'10"	Senior	Sleepy Eye, Minnesota	Graduated
Ellie Colbeck	5	G	5'10"	Senior	Fergus Falls, Minnesota	Graduated
Brooklyn Meyer	31	F	6'2"	Senior	Larchwood, Iowa	Graduated, finishes college eligibility with volleyball team.

=== Recruiting class ===
There was no 2026 recruiting class.

== Roster ==
2025–26 South Dakota State Jackrabbits women's basketball team
Players
Coaches

Pos.	#	Name	Height	Year	Previous school	Hometown
G	1	Audrey Shindelar	5 ft 10 in (1.78 m)	Fr	Stewartville High School	Stewartville, MN
G	4	Emilee Fox	5 ft 8 in (1.73 m)	Jr	Mount Vernon High School	Mount Vernon SD
G	10	Hilary Behrens	6 ft 0 in (1.83 m)	RS Jr	Brandon Valley High School	Brandon, SD
G	11	Hadley Thul	6 ft 2 in (1.88 m)	So	Alexandria Area High School	Alexandria, MN
G	15	Mahli Abdouch	5 ft 7 in (1.7 m)	RS So	O'Gorman Catholic High School	Sioux Falls, SD
G	23	Katie Vasecka	6 ft 2 in (1.88 m)	Jr	Tea Area High School	Tea, SD
F	24	Maggie Hartwig	6 ft 1 in (1.85 m)	Sr	Sauk Prairie High School Evansville	Sauk City, WI
F	25	Abby Hoselton	5 ft 11 in (1.8 m)	So	St. Michael-Albertville High School	St. Michael, MN
G/F	32	Claire Sheppard	6 ft 1 in (1.85 m)	RS So	Flandreau High School	Egan, SD
G	33	Trishelle Miller	5 ft 8 in (1.73 m)	Fr	Bishop Heelan Catholic High School	Sioux City, IA
C	34	Brooklynn Felchle	6 ft 3 in (1.91 m)	So	Legacy High School	Bismarck, ND
F	45	Jaidyn Dunn	6 ft 1 in (1.85 m)	RS So	Thomas Jefferson High School	Sioux Falls, SD

Head coach

- Aaron Johnston (Gustavus Adolphus)

Assistant coach(es)

- Sadie Thramer (Wayne State (NE))
- Macy Stanage (South Dakota State)
- Kacie Jones (Wayne State (NE))
- Shelby Selland (South Dakota State)
- Erika Sage (Northwestern College (IA))

Legend

- (C) Team captain
- (S) Suspended
- (I) Ineligible
- (W) Walk-on
- Injured
- Current redshirt

Roster

== Schedule ==
Date time, TV	Rank^{#}	Opponent^{#}	Result	Record	High points	High rebounds	High assists	Site (attendance) city, state
Exhibition
October 28, 2026*; 7:00 p.m.		St. Cloud State	W 91–62		–	–	–	First Bank and Trust Arena; Brookings, SD
Non-conference regular season
November 2, 2026*; 7:00 p.m., Midco Sports		Creighton	L 71–73	0–1	15 – Shindelar	8 – Sheppard	4 – Fox	First Bank and Trust Arena (2,453); Brookings, SD
November 6, 2026*; 6:00 p.m., Summit League Network		Northern Iowa	W 76–54	1–1	18 – Meyer	8 – Meyer	7 – Fox	First Bank and Trust Arena (2,878); Brookings, SD
November 11, 2026*; 6:00 p.m., SECN		at No. 6 Texas	L 63–93	1–2	12 – Tied	8 – Meyer	5 – Abdouch	Moody Center (9,700); Austin, TX
November 15, 2026*; 1:00 p.m., CBSSN		No. 19т Oklahoma State	L 80–90	1–3	18 – Tied	6 – Vasecka	6 – Abdouch	First Bank and Trust Arena (2,689); Brookings, SD
November 18, 2026*; 7:00 p.m., Summit League Network		Wyoming	W 74–37	2–3	17 – Abdouch	8 – Meyer	5 – Abdouch	First Bank and Trust Arena (2,551); Brookings, SD
November 22, 2026*; 1:30 p.m., ESPN+		vs. Kansas; 28.5 Hoops Women's Invitational						T-Mobile Center; Kansas City, MO
November 27, 2026*; 4:45 p.m., BallerTV		vs. Rutgers; Daytona Beach Classic						Ocean Center; Daytona Beach, FL
November 28, 2026*; 4:45 p.m., BallerTV		vs. Kentucky; Daytona Beach Classic						Ocean Center; Daytona Beach, FL
December 2, 2026*; 7:00 p.m., Summit League Network		Dakota Wesleyan						First Bank and Trust Arena; Brookings, SD
December 6, 2026*; 2:00 p.m.		at Illinois State						CEFCU Arena; Normal, IL
December 9, 2026*; 7:00 p.m.		Dakota State						First Bank and Trust Arena; Brookings, SD
December 13, 2026*; 3:00 p.m.		at Montana State						Worthington Arena; Bozeman, MT
December 19, 2026*; 10:00 a.m.		vs. IU Indy; West Palm Beach Classic						Rubin Arena; West Palm Beach, FL
December 21, 2026*; 2:15 p.m.		vs. Ole Miss; West Palm Beach Classic						Rubin Arena; West Palm Beach, FL
December 30, 2026*; 8:00 p.m.		at Gonzaga						McCarthey Athletic Center; Spokane, WA
January 2, 2027*; 2:00 p.m.		Black Hills State						First Bank and Trust Arena; Brookings, SD
Summit League regular season
January 7, 2027; 7:00 p.m.		Kansas City						First Bank and Trust Arena; Brookings, SD
January 9, 2027; 1:00 p.m.		Oral Roberts						First Bank and Trust Arena; Brookings, SD
January 16, 2027; 2:00 p.m.		South Dakota						First Bank and Trust Arena; Brookings, SD
January 21, 2027; 7:00 p.m.		at North Dakota State						Scheels Center; Fargo, ND
January 23, 2027; 1:00 p.m.		at North Dakota						Betty Engelstad Sioux Center; Grand Forks, ND
January 28, 2027; 7:00 p.m.		St. Thomas (MN)						First Bank and Trust Arena; Brookings, SD
January 30, 2027; 2:00 p.m.		Omaha						First Bank and Trust Arena; Brookings, SD
February 4, 2027; 7:00 p.m.		at Oral Roberts						Mabee Center; Tulsa, OK
February 6, 2027; 2:00 p.m.		at Kansas City						Swinney Recreation Center; Kansas City, MO
February 13, 2027; TBA		at South Dakota						Sanford Coyote Sports Center; Vermillion, SD
February 18, 2027; 7:00 p.m.		North Dakota						First Bank and Trust Arena; Brookings, SD
February 20, 2027; 2:00 p.m.		North Dakota State						First Bank and Trust Arena; Brookings, SD
February 25, 2027; 6:30 p.m.		at Omaha						Baxter Arena; Omaha, NE
February 27, 2027; 6:00 p.m.		at St. Thomas (MN)						Lee & Penny Anderson Arena; St. Paul, MN
Summit League tournament
March 4–7, 2027; TBA		vs. First Round/Quarterfinal						Denny Sanford Premier Center; Sioux Falls, SD
*Non-conference game. ^{#}Rankings from AP Poll. (#) Tournament seedings in parentheses. All times are in Central Time Zone.
