= Valparaiso Beacons women's basketball =

American women's college basketball team

Valparaiso Beacons
| 2026–27 Valparaiso Beacons women's basketball team |
- University: Valparaiso University
- Head coach: Courtney Boyd (2nd season)
- Location: Valparaiso, Indiana
- Arena: Athletics–Recreation Center (capacity: 5,000)
- Conference: Missouri Valley
- Nickname: Beacons
- Colors: Brown and gold

NCAA Division I tournament appearances
- 2003, 2004

Conference tournament champions
- Mid-Continent Conference; 2003, 2004

Conference regular-season champions
- Mid-Continent Conference; 1999, 2002

Uniforms
| Home | Away | Alternate |

The Valparaiso Beacons women's basketball team represents Valparaiso University in Valparaiso, Indiana. The basketball team competes in the Missouri Valley Conference, and they play in the Athletics-Recreation Center.

== History ==
The Beacons have an all-time record of 543–668 as of the end of the 2018–19 season. Valparaiso transitioned into the Missouri Valley Conference in 2017, after Wichita State left the Valley for the American Athletic Conference. Valparaiso was previously associated with the Horizon League in 2007, their third conference since beginning play in 1971. They previously played in the North Star Conference from 1987 to 1992 and the Mid-Continent Conference from 1992 to 2006.

== NCAA tournament results ==
| Year | Seed | Round | Opponent | Result |
|---|---|---|---|---|
| 2003 | #15 | First Round | #2 Purdue | L 51−66 |
| 2004 | #15 | First Round | #2 Kansas State | L 63−71 |
