= 2026–27 North Dakota State Bison women's basketball team =

College women's basketball season

2026–27 North Dakota State Bison women's basketball
- Conference: Summit League
- Record: 2–3 (0–0 Summit)
- Head coach: Jory Collins (8th season)
- Associate head coach: Dylan Geissert
- Assistant coaches: Jaime Adams; Michaela Everett
- Home arena: Scheels Center

2026–27 Summit League women's basketball standings
	Conf.				Overall
Team	W		L	PCT	W		L	PCT
South Dakota	0	–	0	–	4	–	1	.800
St. Thomas	0	–	0	–	3	–	2	.600
Kansas City	0	–	0	–	3	–	3	.500
Omaha	0	–	0	–	2	–	3	.400
South Dakota State	0	–	0	–	2	–	3	.400
Oral Roberts	0	–	0	–	2	–	4	.333
North Dakota	0	–	0	–	1	–	3	.250
North Dakota State	0	–	0	–	1	–	3	.250
† 2027 Summit League tournament winner As of November 20, 2026

The 2026–27 North Dakota State Bison women's basketball team represents North Dakota State University during the 2026–27 NCAA Division I women's basketball season. The Bison, who are led by eighth-year head coach Jory Collins, play their home games at the Scheels Center, as members of the Summit League.

== Previous season ==
The Bison finished the 2025–26 season 26–3, 15–1 in Summit League play to finish in first place and win their first Summit regular season title. In the Summit League tournament, the Bison defeated Omaha in the quarterfinal, St. Thomas in the semifinal, before falling to South Dakota State in the championship game. Since NDSU was a conference regular season champion and did not make the NCAA tournament, they automatically made the 2026 Women's Basketball Invitation Tournament as a top seed in their own region. They defeated Chattanooga in the first round, but lost to Columbia in the second round.

== Offseason ==
=== Departures ===
Name	Number	Pos.	Height	Year	Hometown	Reason for departure
Molly Lenz	1	G	5'8"	3rd	Victoria, MN	Retired from basketball
Audrey Martinez-Stewart	5	G	5'5"	4th	St. Paul, MN	Graduated
Amelia Hobson	8	G	6'0"	2nd	Parkdale, Australia	Transferred to Florida Gulf Coast
Abby Graham	10	G	5'10"	4th	Portland, OR	Graduated

=== Incoming transfers ===
Name	Number	Pos.	Height	Year	Hometown	Previous school
Madelynn Muniz	3	G	5'9"	4th	Phoenix, AZ	Cal State Fullerton
Elena Lazareic	10	G	5'11"	3rd	Ljubljana, Slovenia	Gimanzija Moste

=== 2026 recruiting class ===
College recruiting
Name	Hometown	School	Height	Weight	Commit date
Liza Trenbeath; G	Kindred, North Dakota	Kindred High School	5 ft 11 in (1.80 m)	N/A	May 5, 2026
Liza Trenbeath; G	Recruit ratings: Scout: Rivals: 247Sports: ESPN: (0)				
Overall recruit ranking:
Note: In many cases, Scout, Rivals, 247Sports, On3, and ESPN may conflict in their listings of height and weight.; In these cases, the average was taken. ESPN grades are on a 100-point scale.; Sources: "2026 Team Ranking". Rivals.

=== Roster ===
2026–27 North Dakota State Bison women's basketball team
Players
Coaches

Pos.	#	Name	Height	Year	Hometown
G	3	Madelynn Muniz	5 ft 9 in (1.75 m)	Sr	Phoenix, AZ
G	5	Liza Trenbeath	5 ft 11 in (1.8 m)	Fr	Kindred, ND
G	10	Elena Lazareic (injured)	5 ft 11 in (1.8 m)	Jr	Ljubjana, Slovenia
G	12	Marisa Frost	5 ft 8 in (1.73 m)	Jr	Lino Lakes, MN
G	13	Sophie Hawkinson	5 ft 8 in (1.73 m)	So	Plymouth, MN
F	14	Georgia Ell	6 ft 2 in (1.88 m)	So	Sydney, Australia
F	15	Karrington Asp	6 ft 2 in (1.88 m)	Jr	Epworth, IA
F	22	Avery Koenen (injured)	6 ft 3 in (1.91 m)	Sr	Montevideo, MN
G	30	Jocelyn Schiller	5 ft 7 in (1.7 m)	Jr	Grand Forks, ND
F	31	Lily Niebuhr	6 ft 2 in (1.88 m)	GS	Jordan, MN
F	32	Miriley Simon	6 ft 1 in (1.85 m)	Sr	West Fargo, ND
F	35	McKenna Johnson	6 ft 0 in (1.83 m)	So	Mandan, ND
G	40	Abby Krzewinski (injured)	5 ft 11 in (1.8 m)	Sr	Wayzata, MN

Head coach

- Jory Collins (Emporia State)

Assistant coach(es)

- Jaime Adams (North Dakota State)
- Michaela Everett (Wisconsin)
- Ashley Davis (TCU)

Legend

- (C) Team captain
- (S) Suspended
- (I) Ineligible
- (W) Walk-on
- Injured
- Current redshirt

Roster
Last update: September 5, 2026

== Schedule and results ==
Date time, TV	Rank^{#}	Opponent^{#}	Result	Record	High points	High rebounds	High assists	Site (attendance) city, state
Non-conference regular season
November 2, 2026*; 8:00 p.m., YouTube		at Gonzaga	L 56–62	0–1	20 – Asp	16 – Asp	3 – Hawkinson	McCarthey Athletic Center (4,464); Spokane, WA
November 5, 2026*; 7:00 p.m., WDAY Xtra/Summit League Network		Augustana (SD)	W 86–60	1–1	20 – Schiller	8 – Simon	7 – Hawkinson	Scheels Center (763); Fargo, ND
November 9, 2026*; 7:00 p.m., WDAY Xtra/SLN		Creighton	L 60–66	1–2	20 – Asp	8 – Tied (2)	3 – Schiller	Scheels Center (941); Fargo, ND
November 12, 2026*; 6:00 p.m., ESPN+		at Butler	L 61–68	1–3	14 – Frost	13 – Asp	4 – Frost	Hinkle Fieldhouse; Indianapolis, IN
November 19, 2026*; 6:30 p.m., ESPN+		at UTRGV	W 80–68	2–3	22 – Schiller	6 – Asp	5 – Asp	UTRGV Fieldhouse; Edinburg, TX
November 21, 2026*; 12:00 p.m., ESPN+		at UTSA						Convocation Center; San Antonio, TX
November 26, 2026*; 2:30 p.m., TBD		vs. Fairfield; St. Pete Showcase						McArthur Center; St. Petersburg, FL
November 28, 2026*; 11:00 a.m., TBD		vs. McNeese; St. Pete Showcase						McArthur Center; St. Petersburg, FL
December 3, 2026*; 11:00 a.m., WDAY Xtra/SLN		Concordia–Moorhead						Scheels Center; Fargo, ND
December 6, 2026*; 1:00 p.m., WDAY Xtra/SLN		Northern Iowa						Scheels Center; Fargo, ND
December 10, 2026*; 6:30 p.m., ESPN+		at Kansas						Allen Fieldhouse; Lawrence, KS
December 12, 2026*; 1:00 p.m., ESPN+		at Missouri State						Great Southern Bank Arena; Springfield, MO
December 20, 2026*; 10:00 a.m., TBD		vs. Saint Louis; West Palm Beach Classic						Rubin Arena; West Palm Beach, FL
December 21, 2026*; 10:00 a.m., TBD		vs. Temple; West Palm Beach Classic						Rubin Arena; West Palm Beach, FL
December 30, 2026*; 5:00 p.m., WDAY Xtra/SLN		Dordt						Scheels Center; Fargo, ND
Summit League regular season
January 7, 2027; 7:00 p.m., WDAY Xtra/SLN		St. Thomas						Scheels Center; Fargo, ND
January 9, 2027; 1:00 p.m., WDAY Xtra/SLN		Omaha						Scheels Center; Fargo, ND
January 14, 2027; 7:00 p.m., SLN		at Kansas City						Swinney Recreation Center; Kansas City, MO
January 16, 2027; 12:00 p.m., SLN		at Oral Roberts						Mabee Center; Tulsa, OK
January 21, 2027; 7:00 p.m., WDAY Xtra/SLN		South Dakota State						Scheels Center; Fargo, ND
January 23, 2027; 1:00 p.m., WDAY Xtra/SLN		South Dakota						Scheels Center; Fargo, ND
January 30, 2027; TBA, SLN		at North Dakota						Betty Engelstad Sioux Center; Grand Forks, ND
February 4, 2027; 6:30 p.m., SLN		at Omaha						Baxter Arena; Omaha, NE
February 7, 2027; 1:00 p.m., CBSSN		at St. Thomas						Lee and Penny Anderson Arena; St. Paul, MN
February 11, 2027; 7:00 p.m., WDAY Xtra/SLN		Oral Roberts						Scheels Center; Fargo, ND
February 13, 2027; 1:00 p.m., WDAY Xtra/SLN		Kansas City						Scheels Center; Fargo, ND
February 18, 2027; 7:00 p.m., SLN		at South Dakota						Sanford Coyote Sports Center; Vermillion, SD
February 20, 2027; 2:00 p.m., SLN		at South Dakota State						First Bank and Trust Arena; Brookings, SD
February 26, 2027; 7:00 p.m., WDAY Xtra/SLN		North Dakota						Scheels Center; Fargo, ND
Summit League tournament
March 4–7, 2027*; TBA, CBSSN/SLN		vs. Summit League tournament						Denny Sanford Premier Center; Sioux Falls, SD
*Non-conference game. ^{#}Rankings from AP Poll. (#) Tournament seedings in parentheses. All times are in Central.
