= 2026–27 Drake Bulldogs women's basketball team =

American college basketball season

2026–27 Drake Bulldogs women's basketball
- Conference: Missouri Valley Conference
- Record: 2–3 (0–0 MVC)
- Head coach: Allison Pohlman (6th season)
- Assistant coaches: Lisa Carlsen; Whitney Moia; Kristin Rotert; Becca Hittner
- Home arena: Knapp Center (Capacity: 6,424)

2026–27 Missouri Valley Conference women's basketball standings
	Conf.				Overall
Team	W		L	PCT	W		L	PCT
Illinois State	0	–	0	–	6	–	0	1.000
UIC	0	–	0	–	3	–	2	.600
Indiana State	0	–	0	–	3	–	3	.500
Bradley	0	–	0	–	2	–	3	.400
Drake	0	–	0	–	2	–	3	.400
Murray State	0	–	0	–	2	–	3	.400
Southern Illinois	0	–	0	–	1	–	3	.250
Belmont	0	–	0	–	1	–	4	.200
Northern Iowa	0	–	0	–	1	–	4	.200
Valparaiso	0	–	0	–	1	–	4	.200
Evansville	0	–	0	–	0	–	5	.000
† 2027 MVC tournament winner As of November 19, 2026

The 2026–27 Drake Bulldogs women's basketball team represent Drake University during the 2026–27 NCAA Division I women's basketball season. The Bulldogs, led by sixth-year Suzie Glazer Burt Head Women's Basketball Coach Allison Pohlman, play their home games at the Knapp Center in Des Moines, Iowa as members of the Missouri Valley Conference (MVC).

== Previous season ==
The Bulldogs finished the 2025–26 season 12–20, 10–10 in MVC play, to finish in sixth place. In the MVC tournament, they defeated Valparaiso in the opening round, before falling to Illinois State in the quarterfinals.

== Offseason ==
=== Departures ===
Name	Number	Pos.	Height	Year	Hometown	Reason for departure
Abbie Aalsma	3	G	5'9"	Sr	Waupun, WI	Graduated
Shannon Fornshell	4	G	6'1"	Jr	Plymouth, MN	Left Program
Ava Hawthorne	21	G	5'9"	Sr	Ames, IA	Graduated

=== Incoming transfers ===
Name	Number	Pos.	Height	Year	Hometown	Previous School
Allie Myers	32	F	6'1"	Sr	Carlsbad, NM	Tarleton State

=== 2026 recruiting class ===
College recruiting
Name	Hometown	School	Height	Weight	Commit date
Alex Couch; G	Liberty, MO	Liberty North	5 ft 10 in (1.78 m)	N/A	May 22, 2025
Alex Couch; G	Recruit ratings: No ratings found				
Grace Fincham; G	Iowa City, IA	Iowa City West	5 ft 10 in (1.78 m)	N/A	June 1, 2025
Grace Fincham; G	Recruit ratings: No ratings found				
Karis Finley; F	Cedar Falls, IA	Cedar Falls	5 ft 10 in (1.78 m)	N/A	Aug 9, 2024
Karis Finley; F	Recruit ratings: No ratings found				

== Preseason ==
=== Preseason rankings ===
MVC Preseason Poll
Predicted finish	Team	Votes (1st place)
1	Murray State	477 (41)
2	Illinois State	396
3	Belmont	375 (2)
4	Northern Iowa	343 (1)
5	Drake	317
6	UIC	267

=== Preseason honors ===
"Players to Watch" List
Player	Position	Year	Hometown
Anna Becker	G	SO	Topeka, KS
Brooklin Dailey	G	SR	Pleasant Hill, IA

== Roster ==
2026–27 Drake Bulldogs women's basketball team
Players
Coaches

Pos.	#	Name	Height	Year	Previous school	Hometown
G	0	Alex Couch	5 ft 10 in (1.78 m)	Fr	Liberty North	Liberty, MO
G	1	Mylea Monahan	5 ft 7 in (1.7 m)	RS Fr	Glencoe-Silver Lake	Silver Lake, MN
G	2	Grace Knutson	5 ft 10 in (1.78 m)	Jr	Cedar Falls	Cedar Falls, IA
G	4	Grace Fincham	5 ft 10 in (1.78 m)	Fr	Iowa City West	Iowa City, IA
G	8	Mya Crawford	5 ft 8 in (1.73 m)	RS Fr	Centennial	Ankeny, IA
G	11	Peyton McCabe	5 ft 7 in (1.7 m)	Jr	Skutt Catholic	Blair, NE
F	12	Karis Finley	5 ft 10 in (1.78 m)	Fr	Cedar Falls	Cedar Falls, IA
F	15	Maggie Taylor	6 ft 2 in (1.88 m)	Jr	Hill City	Rapid City, SD
G	17	Anna Becker	5 ft 10 in (1.78 m)	So	Seaman	Topeka, KS
G	20	Lexi Carlsen	5 ft 8 in (1.73 m)	Jr	Northern Illinois; Sycamore	Sycamore, IL
G	22	Brooklin Dailey	6 ft 0 in (1.83 m)	Sr	Southeast Polk	Pleasant Hill, IA
F	23	Quinn Vice	6 ft 4 in (1.93 m)	So	Pleasant Valley	Bettendorf, IA
F	30	Taedyn Gray	6 ft 2 in (1.88 m)	GS	Shawnee Mission West	Lenexa, KS
F	32	Allie Myers	6 ft 1 in (1.85 m)	Sr	Tarleton State; Carlsbad	Carlsbad, NM

Head coach

- Allison Pohlman (Northern Iowa)

Assistant coach(es)

- Lisa Carlsen (Northwest Missouri State)
- Whitney Moia (MidAmerica Nazarene)
- Kristin Rotert (South Dakota State)
- Becca Hittner (Drake)

Legend

- (C) Team captain
- (S) Suspended
- (I) Ineligible
- (W) Walk-on
- Injured
- Current redshirt

Roster
Last update: October 25, 2026

== Schedule and results ==
Date time, TV	Rank^{#}	Opponent^{#}	Result	Record	High points	High rebounds	High assists	Site (attendance) city, state
Exhibition
October 28, 2026*; 6:00 pm		No. 22 Minnesota Duluth (D-II)	W 66–56	–	14 – Becker	8 – Crawford	8 – Dailey	Knapp Center; Des Moines, IA
Non-Conference Regular Season
November 3, 2026*; 6:00 pm, ESPN+		Eastern Illinois	W 76–54	1–0	16 – Vice	6 – Tied	5 – Monahan	Knapp Center (2,222); Des Moines, IA
November 6, 2026*; 11:00 am, ESPN+		at Kansas	L 49–74	1–1	12 – Dailey	4 – Tied	2 – Tied	Allen Fieldhouse (4,751); Lawrence, KS
November 10, 2026*; 11:00 am, ESPN+		Cleveland State	W 76–71	2–1	19 – Monahan	11 – Finley	6 – Dailey	Knapp Center (6,424); Des Moines, IA
November 13, 2026*; 5:30 pm, SL Network		at Omaha	L 73–77	2–2	15 – Monahan	7 – Dailey	7 – Dailey	Baxter Arena; Omaha, NE
November 17, 2026*; 6:00 pm, ESPN+		St. Thomas	L 41–68	2–3	10 – Vice	9 – Finley	3 – Dailey	Knapp Center (2,413); Des Moines, IA
November 22, 2026*; 2:00 pm, ESPN+		at Iowa State						Hilton Coliseum; Ames, IA
November 27, 2026*; 2:00 pm, ESPN+		Saint Louis; Drake Classic						Knapp Center; Des Moines, IA
November 28, 2026*; 2:00 pm, ESPN+		Detroit Mercy; Drake Classic						Knapp Center; Des Moines, IA
December 1, 2026*; 6:00 pm, ESPN+		No. 10 Iowa						Knapp Center; Des Moines, IA
December 5, 2026*; 3:30 pm, ESPN+		at Creighton						D. J. Sokol Arena; Omaha, NE
December 13, 2026*; 1:00 pm		at North Dakota						Betty Engelstad Sioux Center; Grand Forks, ND
December 15, 2026*; 7:00 pm		at South Dakota						Sanford Coyote Sports Center; Vermillion, SD
Conference Regular Season
December 18, 2026; 6:00 pm, ESPN+		Evansville						Knapp Center; Des Moines, IA
December 20, 2026; 2:00 pm, ESPN+		Southern Illinois						Knapp Center; Des Moines, IA
December 30, 2026; 6:00 pm, ESPN+		at Bradley						Renaissance Coliseum; Peoria, IL
January 3, 2027; 1:00 pm		at Indiana State						Hulman Center; Terre Haute, IN
January 7, 2027; 6:30 pm		at Illinois State						CEFCU Arena; Normal, IL
January 9, 2027; 2:00 pm		at UIC						Credit Union 1 Arena; Chicago, IL
January 14, 2027; 6:00 pm		Murray State						Knapp Center; Des Moines, IA
January 16, 2027; 2:00 pm		Belmont						Knapp Center; Des Moines, IA
January 19, 2027; 6:00 pm		at Valparaiso						Athletics-Recreation Center; Valparaiso, IN
January 22, 2027; 6:00 pm		Indiana State						Knapp Center; Des Moines, IA
January 24, 2027; TBD		UIC						Knapp Center; Des Moines, IA
January 28, 2027; 6:00 pm		Illinois State						Knapp Center; Des Moines, IA
January 31, 2027; 2:00 pm		at Northern Iowa; Rivalry						McLeod Center; Cedar Falls, IA
February 5, 2027; 6:00 pm		at Southern Illinois						Banterra Center; Carbondale, IL
February 7, 2027; 2:00 pm		at Murray State						CFSB Center; Murray, KY
February 11, 2027; 6:30 pm		at Belmont						Curb Event Center; Nashville, TN
February 13, 2027; 1:00 pm		at Evansville						Meeks Family Fieldhouse; Evansville, IN
February 19, 2027; 6:00 pm		Bradley						Knapp Center; Des Moines, IA
February 21, 2027; 2:00 pm		Valparaiso						Knapp Center; Des Moines, IA
February 27, 2027; 2:00 pm		Northern Iowa; Rivalry						Knapp Center; Des Moines, IA
Conference Tournament
March 2027; TBD, TBD		vs. (#) TBD; MVC Tournament						Enterprise Center; St. Louis, MO
*Non-conference game. ^{#}Rankings from AP poll. (#) Tournament seedings in parentheses. All times are in Central.

== See also ==
- 2026–27 Drake Bulldogs men's basketball team
