= 2017–18 South Dakota State Jackrabbits women's basketball team =

Intercollegiate basketball season

2017–18 South Dakota State Jackrabbits women's basketball

Summit League tournament champions

NCAA women's tournament, first round
- Conference: Summit League
- Record: 26–7 (12–2 The Summit)
- Head coach: Aaron Johnston (18th season)
- Assistant coaches: Mike Jewett; Katie Falco; Haylie Linn
- Home arena: Frost Arena

2017–18 Summit League women's basketball standings
	Conf.				Overall
Team	W		L	PCT	W		L	PCT
South Dakota	14	–	0	1.000	29	–	7	.806
South Dakota State †	12	–	2	.857	26	–	7	.788
Western Illinois	10	–	4	.714	22	–	10	.688
Oral Roberts	7	–	7	.500	17	–	13	.567
Denver	7	–	7	.500	16	–	14	.533
Omaha	3	–	11	.214	12	–	16	.429
North Dakota State	2	–	12	.143	9	–	20	.310
Fort Wayne	1	–	13	.071	4	–	24	.143
† 2018 Summit League Tournament winner As of March 25, 2018; Rankings from AP Poll

The 2017–18 South Dakota State Jackrabbits women's basketball team represent South Dakota State University in the 2017–18 NCAA Division I women's basketball season. The Jackrabbits, led by eighteenth-year head coach Aaron Johnston, competed in the Summit League. They played their home games in Frost Arena, in Brookings, South Dakota. They finished the season 26–7, 12–2 in Summit League play to finish in second place. They were champions of the Summit League women's tournament and earned an automatic trip to the NCAA women's tournament, where they lost to Villanova in an overtime thriller in the first round.

== Previous season ==
The 2016–17 South Dakota State Jackrabbits women's basketball team went 23-9 overall and 12-4 in conference. The Jackrabbits lost in the 2017 Summit League women's basketball tournament to IUPUI, not qualifying for the NCAA Tournament. As a result of not qualifying, the Jackrabbits made it to the 2017 WNIT.

== Roster ==
2017–18 South Dakota State Jackrabbits women's basketball team
Players
Coaches

Pos.	#	Name	Height	Year	Previous school	Hometown
G	1	Alexis Alexander	5 ft 7 in (1.7 m)	Sr	Champlin Park HS	Brooklyn Park, MN
G	2	Rylie Cascio Jensen	5 ft 10 in (1.78 m)	So	Fremont; Nebraska	Fremont, NE
G	3	Lindsey Theuninck (redshirt)	5 ft 10 in (1.78 m)	RS Fr	Mankato Loyola	Mankato, MN
G	11	Madison Guebert	5 ft 8 in (1.73 m)	Jr	Eastview	Apple Valley, MN
G	12	Macy Miller (C)	6 ft 0 in (1.83 m)	RS Jr	Mitchell	Mitchell, SD
G	21	Tylee Irwin	6 ft 0 in (1.83 m)	Fr	Wahpeton	Wahpeton, ND
F	24	Tagyn Larson	6 ft 2 in (1.88 m)	RS So	Roosevelt HS; Iowa	Sioux Falls, SD
G	32	Sydney Palmer	5 ft 11 in (1.8 m)	Jr	T. F. Riggs HS	Pierre, SD
G	33	Sydney Tracy	6 ft 0 in (1.83 m)	Jr	St. Michael-Albertville HS	St. Michael, MN
C	35	Tiffaney Flaata (C)	6 ft 2 in (1.88 m)	Sr	Prior Lake HS	Savage, MN
G/F	44	Myah Selland	6 ft 2 in (1.88 m)	Fr	Sanborn Central/Woonsocket HS	Letcher, SD
F	45	Ellie Thompson (C)	6 ft 1 in (1.85 m)	Sr	Chaska HS	Chaska, MN
C	50	Megan Bultsma	6 ft 3 in (1.91 m)	So	Mount Vernon/Plankinton HS	Plankinton, SD

Head coach

- Aaron Johnston (Gustavus Adolphus)

Assistant coach(es)

- Mike Jewett (Augustana (SD))
- Katie Falco (Northern Iowa)
- Haylie Linn (Toledo)

Legend

- (C) Team captain
- (S) Suspended
- (I) Ineligible
- (W) Walk-on
- Injured
- Current redshirt

Roster

== Schedule ==
Date time, TV	Rank^{#}	Opponent^{#}	Result	Record	Site (attendance) city, state
Exhibition
October 26, 2017*; 7:00 pm		MSU-Moorhead	W 93–58		Frost Arena (1,204); Brookings, SD
November 2, 2017*; 6:00 pm		Northern State	W 71–59		Frost Arena (1,542); Brookings, SD
Regular season
November 10, 2017*; 6:00 pm		NJIT	W 92–48	1–0	Frost Arena (2,169); Brookings, SD
November 12, 2017*; 1:00 pm		at George Washington	W 97–88 ^{OT}	2-0	Charles E. Smith Center (1,135); Washington, D.C.
November 15, 2017*; 7:00 pm, MidcoSN2/ESPN3		North Dakota	W 66–52	3–0	Frost Arena (1,646); Brookings, SD
November 18, 2017*; 1:00 pm, ESPN3		at Green Bay	L 41–55	3–1	Kress Events Center (2,026); Green Bay, WI
November 24, 2017*; 1:30 pm		vs. NC State; Puerto Rico Clasico	W 75–67	4–1	Cardinal Gibbons Arena (132); Fort Lauderdale, FL
November 25, 2017*; 1:30 pm		vs. Charlotte; Puerto Rico Clasico	W 71–70	5–1	Cardinal Gibbons Arena (158); Fort Lauderdale, FL
November 30, 2017*; 7:00 pm		Northern Iowa	W 57–47	6–1	Frost Arena (1,760); Brookings, SD
December 3, 2017*; 2:00 pm, MidcoSN/ESPN3		No. 4 Louisville	L 64–68	6–2	Frost Arena (2,506); Brookings, SD
December 6, 2017*; 7:00 pm, MidcoSN2/ESPN3		Oklahoma	W 67–61	7–2	Frost Arena (2,068); Brookings, SD
December 9, 2017*; 7:00 pm		Bowling Green	W 76–44	8-2	Frost Arena (1,771); Brookings, SD
December 15, 2017*; 4:00 pm		at Creighton	L 65-72	8–3	D. J. Sokol Arena (780); Omaha, NE
December 17, 2017*; 2:00 pm, ESPN3		at Drake	W 85–78	9–3	Knapp Center (2,309); Des Moines, IA
December 20, 2017*; 7:00 pm		Wichita State	W 96–64	10–3	Frost Arena (1,486); Brookings, SD
December 29, 2017*; 6:30 pm, ESPN3		at Florida Gulf Coast	L 78–87	10–4	Alico Arena (2,234); Fort Myers, FL
January 3, 2018; 7:00 pm, MidcoSN2/ESPN3		Omaha	W 89–64	11–4 (1–0)	Frost Arena (1,523); Brookings, SD
January 6, 2018; 2:00 pm		North Dakota State	W 83–63	12–4 (2–0)	Frost Arena (1,989); Brookings, SD
January 11, 2018; 8:00 pm		at Denver	W 69–58	13–4 (3–0)	Hamilton Gymnasium (481); Denver, CO
January 13, 2018; 2:00 pm		at Oral Roberts	W 77–70	14–4 (4–0)	Mabee Center (1,158); Tulsa, OK
January 16, 2018*; 7:00 pm		Dakota Wesleyan	W 76–63	15–4	Frost Arena (1,430); Brookings, SD
January 20, 2018; 2:00 pm		Western Illinois	W 84–48	16–4 (5–0)	Frost Arena (2,129); Brookings, SD
January 25, 2018; 7:00 pm, MidcoSN/ESPN3		South Dakota	L 61–67	16–5 (5–1)	Frost Arena (3,091); Brookings, SD
January 27, 2018; 2:00 pm, MidcoSN/ESPN3		Fort Wayne	W 105–49	17–5 (6–1)	Frost Arena (2,881); Brookings, SD
February 1, 2018; 7:00 pm, MidcoSN2/ESPN3		at North Dakota State	W 85–64	18–5 (7–1)	Scheels Center (1,920); Fargo, ND
February 3, 2018; 1:00 pm		at Omaha	W 103–54	19–5 (8–1)	Baxter Arena (1,383); Omaha, NE
February 8, 2018; 7:00 pm		Denver; Pink Game	W 95–59	20–5 (9–1)	Frost Arena (1,543); Brookings, SD
February 10, 2018; 2:00 pm		Oral Roberts	W 96–72	21–5 (10–1)	Frost Arena (2,403); Brookings, SD
February 17, 2018; 4:30 pm		at Western Illinois	W 70–42	22–5 (11–1)	Western Hall (1,139); Macomb, IL
February 21, 2018; 7:00 pm, MidcoSN/ESPN3		at South Dakota	L 75–80	22–6 (11–2)	Sanford Coyote Sports Center (4,018); Vermillion, SD
February 24, 2018; 2:00 pm		at Fort Wayne	W 77–55	23–6 (12–2)	Hilliard Gates Sports Center (1,052); Fort Wayne, IN
The Summit League women's tournament
March 3, 2018; 2:30 pm, MidcoSN/ESPN3	(2)	vs. (7) North Dakota State; Quarterfinals	W 87–62	24–6	Denny Sanford Premier Center (8,944); Sioux Falls, SD
March 5, 2018; 2:30 pm, MidcoSN/ESPN3	(2)	vs. (3) Western Illinois; Semifinals	W 80–51	25–6	Denny Sanford Premier Center (6,424); Sioux Falls, SD
March 6, 2018; 1:00 pm, ESPNU	(2)	vs. (1) South Dakota; Championship	W 65–50	26–6	Denny Sanford Premier Center (8,704); Sioux Falls, SD
NCAA Women's tournament
March 16, 2018*; 6:30 pm, ESPN2	(9 S)	vs. (8 S) Villanova; First Round	L 74–81 ^{OT}	26–7	Edmund P. Joyce Center (4,431); South Bend, IN
*Non-conference game. ^{#}Rankings from AP Poll. (#) Tournament seedings in parentheses. All times are in Central Time.

== Rankings ==
Regular season polls
Poll	Pre- season	Week 2	Week 3	Week 4	Week 5	Week 6	Week 7	Week 8	Week 9	Week 10	Week 11	Week 12	Week 13	Week 14	Week 15	Week 16	Week 17	Week 18	Week 19	Final
AP				RV	RV							RV								N/A
Coaches	RV	N/A				RV	RV													

Legend
	Increase in ranking
	Decrease in ranking
	Not ranked previous week
(RV)	Received votes
(NR)	Not ranked
