= Tanya Warren =

American basketball coach (born 1965)

Current position
- Title: Head coach
- Team: Northern Iowa
- Conference: MVC
- Record: 357–258 (.580)

Biographical details
- Born: March 29, 1965 (age 61); Des Moines, Iowa, U.S.

Playing career
- 1984–1988: Creighton
- Position: Guard

Coaching career (HC unless noted)
- 1988–1992: Boys Town HS
- 1992–1994: Duchesne Academy
- 1994–1995: Iowa State (asst.)
- 1995–2001: Northern Iowa (asst.)
- 2001–2004: Missouri (asst.)
- 2004–2007: Creighton (asst.)
- 2007–present: Northern Iowa

Head coaching record
- Overall: 357–258 (.580)
- Tournaments: 0–2 (NCAA); 3–3 (WNIT); 3–1 (WBI); 0–1 (WBIT)

Accomplishments and honors

Championships
- 2x MVC regular season (2011, 2016); 2x MVC tournament (2010, 2011)

Awards
- 3x MVC Coach of the Year (2011, 2014, 2016)
Medal record
Assistant Coach for United States
World University Games
Gold medal – first place	2015 South Korea	Team competition

Tanya Warren (born March 29, 1965) is an American basketball coach who is currently the head women's basketball coach at the University of Northern Iowa.

== Early life and education ==
Born in Des Moines, Iowa, Warren graduated from Abraham Lincoln High School in 1983, then played basketball at Creighton University in Omaha, Nebraska from 1984 to 1988 at guard, after redshirting her freshman year. At Creighton, among Warren's teammates was Connie Yori, who would later coach at Nebraska. Warren averaged 13.9 points and 3.2 rebounds as a redshirt freshman in 1984–85. Warren averaged 14.6 points and 3.0 rebounds as a sophomore, 18.7 points and 3.8 rebounds as a junior, and 19.1 points, 4.5 rebounds, and 7.8 rebounds as a senior in a season where she only played 10 games.

=== Creighton statistics ===
Basketball statistics
Year	Team	GP	GS	FGM	FGA	FG%	3P	3PA	3P%	FT	FTA	FT%	REB	RBG	AST	BLK	STL	PTS	PPG
1983–84	Creighton	5	5	28	47	59.6	–	–	–	4	7	57.1	14	2.8	10	2	11	60	12.0
1984–85	Creighton	27	27	154	314	49.0	–	–	–	68	91	74.7	86	3.2	150	1	38	376	13.9
1985–86	Creighton	26	26	148	275	53.8	–	–	–	83	98	84.7	78	3	184	0	54	379	14.6
1986–87	Creighton	30	30	226	465	48.6	–	–	–	108	139	77.7	114	3.8	228	2	78	560	18.7
1987–88	Creighton	10	10	74	146	50.7	6	20	30.0	37	48	77.1	45	4.5	78	1	19	191	19.1
TOTAL		98	98	630	1,247	50.5	6	20	30.0	300	383	78.3	337	3.4	650	6	200	1,566	16.0

== Coaching career ==
After graduating from Creighton, Warren remained in Omaha to be girls' basketball head coach at Boys Town High School. In 1992, Warren became head basketball coach at the Duchesne Academy of the Sacred Heart, a girls' Catholic school in Omaha. Two years later, Warren moved up to the collegiate ranks as an assistant coach at Iowa State.

From 1995 to 2001, Warren was an assistant coach at Northern Iowa under Tony DiCecco. Warren then was an assistant at Missouri from 2001 to 2004 under Cindy Stein and at Creighton from 2004 to 2007 under Jim Flanery.

In April 2007, Warren returned to Northern Iowa, this time as head coach. Warren led Northern Iowa to consecutive MVC tournament titles in 2010 and 2011, both of which led to automatic qualification for the NCAA tournament. Northern Iowa later became runner-up in the 2012 WBI and made the WNIT in 2013 and 2016.

On March 4, 2017, Warren became the all-time wins leader in Northern Iowa women's basketball history. She reached her 184th career win with a victory over Missouri State.

On January 22, 2021, Warren recorded her 250th Northern Iowa career win with a victory over Indiana State.

On February 17, 2024, Warren earned her 202nd MVC win. The come-from-behind victory over Murray State moved her into first place in conference wins all-time.

On February 1, 2026, Warren recorded her 350th victory at UNI with a win over in-state rival Drake.

== USA Basketball ==
Warren was selected to be the assistant coach of the USA representative to the World University Games held in Seoul, South Korea July 5–13, 2015. The team won all six games, including the championship game against Canada. The first three quarters the game were quite close with four ties and four lead changes. In the fourth quarter the USA exploded for 34 points to pull out to a large lead, and won the gold-medal with a score of 82–63.

== Head coaching record ==
- UNI
- Missouri Valley

Record table
Season	Team	Overall	Conference	Standing	Postseason
Northern Iowa Panthers (Missouri Valley Conference) (2007–present)
2007–08	Northern Iowa	13–18	8–10	T–6th	
2008–09	Northern Iowa	11–19	9–9	6th	
2009–10	Northern Iowa	17–16	10–8	5th	NCAA first round
2010–11	Northern Iowa	27–6	17–1	1st	NCAA first round
2011–12	Northern Iowa	19–15	9–9	T–5th	WBI Runner-Up
2012–13	Northern Iowa	17–17	10–8	T–4th	WNIT second round
2013–14	Northern Iowa	17–13	13–5	3rd	
2014–15	Northern Iowa	17–15	12–6	4th	WNIT first round
2015–16	Northern Iowa	24–11	15–3	1st	WNIT third round
2016–17	Northern Iowa	24–9	15–3	2nd	NCAA first round
2017–18	Northern Iowa	19–14	13–5	3rd	WNIT first round
2018–19	Northern Iowa	20–13	12–6	3rd	WNIT first round
2019–20	Northern Iowa	18–11	10–8	5th	Postseason canceled due to COVID-19
2020–21	Northern Iowa	17–13	11–7	4th	WNIT semifinals
2021–22	Northern Iowa	23–11	13–5	3rd	WNIT second round
2022–23	Northern Iowa	23–10	16–4	3rd	WNIT second round
2023–24	Northern Iowa	16–16	14–6	4th	WNIT second round
2024–25	Northern Iowa	17–17	11–9	6th	WBIT first round
2025–26	Northern Iowa	18–14	13–7	T–3rd	
2026–27	Northern Iowa	0–0	0–0		
Northern Iowa:		357–258 (.580)	231–119 (.660)		
Total:		357–258 (.580)			
National champion Postseason invitational champion Conference regular season champion Conference regular season and conference tournament champion Division regular season champion Division regular season and conference tournament champion Conference tournament champion
