= Northern Iowa Panthers women's basketball =

Northern Iowa Panthers
2026–27 Northern Iowa Panthers women's basketball team
- University: University of Northern Iowa
- Head coach: Tanya Warren (20th season)
- Location: Cedar Falls, Iowa
- Arena: McLeod Center (capacity: 7,018)
- Conference: Missouri Valley
- Nickname: Panthers
- Colors: Purple and old gold
- Student section: Panther Mayhem

NCAA Division I tournament appearances
- 2010, 2011, 2017

Conference tournament champions
- 2010, 2011

Conference regular-season champions
- 2011, 2016

Uniforms
Home	Away

The Northern Iowa Panthers women's basketball team represents the University of Northern Iowa, located in Cedar Falls, Iowa, in NCAA Division I basketball competition. UNI is currently a member of the Missouri Valley Conference.

== History ==
The modern intercollegiate era of University of Northern Iowa (UNI) women's basketball began in 1968. Wanda Green coached these early UNI teams from 1968-78. UNI’s next head coach, Sandra Williamson (1978-80), oversaw the team’s move to the UNI Dome. J.D. Anderson (1980-84) was head coach when the program joined NCAA Division I basketball competition in the 1982-83 season. Kim Mayden was the Panthers’ next head coach from 1984-89. Terri Laswell (1989-95) led UNI during the team’s transition to the Missouri Valley Conference in 1992. Tony DiCecco was head coach from 1995-2007. The Panthers moved to the McLeod Center at the end of DiCecco's tenure.

Current UNI women’s basketball head coach Tanya Warren started with the Panthers in 2007. Warren has led the team to 12 postseason appearances in her 16 years as head coach. Under Warren, the Panthers made their first trip to the NCAA Division I Women’s Basketball tournament in 2010. UNI returned to the NCAA tournament in 2011 and 2017. On March 4, 2017, Tanya Warren became the all-time wins leader in UNI women's basketball history when she reached her 184th career win with a victory over Missouri State. Warren has been named Missouri Valley Conference Coach of the Year three times. With Warren as coach, the UNI women won Missouri Valley Conference regular season titles in 2011 and 2016 and Missouri Valley Conference tournament championships in 2010 and 2011.

== Rivalries ==
The school has several statewide and national rivalries. In Iowa, typically UNI plays two, if not three of its Iowa neighbors each season. The university plays the University of Iowa, Iowa State University, and Drake University. Additionally, other UNI basketball rivals include, but are not limited to, Creighton University, Indiana State, Southern Illinois, and Wichita State.

== NCAA tournament results ==
Year	Seed	Round	Opponent	Result
2010	#16	First Round	#1 Nebraska	L 44–83
2011	#13	First Round	#4 Michigan State	L 66–69
2017	#10	First Round	#7 DePaul	L 67–88
