= Drake Bulldogs women's basketball =

Drake Bulldogs
2026–27 Drake Bulldogs women's basketball team
- University: Drake University
- Head coach: Allison Pohlman (6th season)
- Location: Des Moines, Iowa
- Arena: Knapp Center (capacity: 6,424)
- Conference: Missouri Valley
- Nickname: Bulldogs
- Colors: Blue and white

NCAA Division I tournament Elite Eight
- 1982
Other NCAA Division I tournament results
Sweet Sixteen	1982, 2002
Appearances	1982, 1984, 1986, 1995, 1997, 1998, 2000, 2001, 2002, 2007, 2017, 2018, 2019, 2023, 2024

Conference tournament champions
- Missouri Valley: 1995, 1997, 1998, 2000, 2007, 2017, 2018, 2023, 2024

Conference regular-season champions
- Gateway; 1984 Missouri Valley; 1997, 1998, 2000, 2001, 2008, 2017, 2018, 2019, 2024

Uniforms
Home	Away

The Drake Bulldogs women's basketball team represents Drake University, located in Des Moines, Iowa, in NCAA Division I basketball competition. Drake competes in the Missouri Valley Conference.

== Record by Year ==
Record table
Season	Coach	Overall	Conference	Standing	Postseason
Drake (Independent) (1974–1983)
1974–75	Carole Baumgarten	10–10			
1975–76	Carole Baumgarten	10–16			
1976–77	Carole Baumgarten	21–4			
1977–78	Carole Baumgarten	23–9			WNIT Quarterfinals
1978–79	Carole Baumgarten	28–5			WNIT Runner Up
1979–80	Carole Baumgarten	24–12			WNIT Third Place
1980–81	Carole Baumgarten	26–7			WNIT Third Place
1981–82	Carole Baumgarten	28–7			NCAA Elite Eight
1982–83	Carole Baumgarten	20–8			
Drake (Gateway Collegiate Athletic Conference) (1983–1993)
1983–84	Carole Baumgarten	22–7	16–2	1st	NCAA First Round
1984–85	Carole Baumgarten	24–6	16–2	2nd	WNIT, semifinals
1985–86	Carole Baumgarten	22–8	16–2	2nd	NCAA Second Round
1986–87	Susan Yow	9–18	9–9	6th	
1987–88	Susan Yow	15–13	12–6	T–4th	
1988–89	Susan Yow	17–11	12–6	3rd	
1989–90	Susan Yow	10–16	8–10	6th	
1990–91	Lisa Bluder	13–17	10–8	4th	
1991–92	Lisa Bluder	11–15	7–11	T–6th	
1992–93	Lisa Bluder	15–13	8–8	T–4th	
Drake (Missouri Valley Conference) (1993–present)
1993–94	Lisa Bluder	16–12	8–8	5th	
1994–95	Lisa Bluder	25–6	13–5	T–2nd	NCAA Second Round
1995–96	Lisa Bluder	16–13	10–8	T–4th	
1996–97	Lisa Bluder	23–7	14–4	1st	NCAA First Round
1997–98	Lisa Bluder	25–5	17–1	1st	NCAA First Round
1998–99	Lisa Bluder	21–10	14–4	2nd	WNIT, Final Four
1999–00	Lisa Bluder	23–7	15–3	1st	NCAA First Round
2000–01	Lisa Stone	23–7	16–2	T–1st	NCAA First Round
2001–02	Lisa Stone	25–8	15–3	2nd	NCAA Sweet Sixteen
2002–03	Lisa Stone	16–12	11–7	T–4th	
2003–04	Amy Stephens	16–15	11–7	3rd	WNIT, first round
2004–05	Amy Stephens	14–15	8–10	T–6th	
2005–06	Amy Stephens	17–12	13–5	2nd	WNIT, first round
2006–07	Amy Stephens	14–19	5–13	8th	NCAA First Round
2007–08	Amy Stephens	23–11	13–5	T–1st	WNIT Second Round
2008–09	Amy Stephens	19–12	12–6	3rd	
2009–10	Amy Stephens	15–15	7–11	T–7th	
2010–11	Amy Stephens	15–15	9–9	6th	
2011–12	Amy Stephens	18–16	9–9	T–5th	WNIT First Round
2012–13	Jennie Baranczyk	11–20	5–13	9th	
2013–14	Jennie Baranczyk	17–15	9–9	5th	
2014–15	Jennie Baranczyk	20–11	15–3	2nd	WNIT First Round
2015–16	Jennie Baranczyk	23–10	14–4	T–2nd	WNIT Second Round
2016–17	Jennie Baranczyk	28–5	18–0	1st	NCAA First Round
2017–18	Jennie Baranczyk	26–8	18–0	1st	NCAA First Round
2018–19	Jennie Baranczyk	27–7	17–1	1st	NCAA First Round
2019–20	Jennie Baranczyk	22–8	14–4	2nd	Postseason cancelled.
2020–21	Jennie Baranczyk	18–12	13–5	2nd	WNIT First Round
2021–22	Allison Pohlman	20–14	9–9	T–6th	WNIT Third Round
2022–23	Allison Pohlman	22–10	14–6	T–4th	NCAA First Round
2023–24	Allison Pohlman	29–6	19–1	1st	NCAA First Round
2024–25	Allison Pohlman	22–12	15–5	T–2nd	WBIT First Round
2025–26	Allison Pohlman	12–20	10–10	6th	
2026–27	Allison Pohlman	0–0	0–0		
Total:		987–565	509–243		
National champion Postseason invitational champion Conference regular season champion Conference regular season and conference tournament champion Division regular season champion Division regular season and conference tournament champion Conference tournament champion

School	Season	Record	(Conf. Record)	Postseason
Total	48 years	946–539	(480–238)	27 Postseason bids

- Totals updated through the end of the 2022–23 regular season.

Drake was awarded a forfeit victory over Valparaiso during the 1995–96 season due to Valparaiso's use of an ineligible player. Drake originally lost that game 79–80.

== Postseason ==
=== NCAA tournament history ===
The Bulldogs have a 6–15 tournament record.

Year	Seed	Round	Opponent	Result
1982	No. 4	First round Regional semifinals Elite Eight	No. 5 Ohio State; No. 1 Long Beach State; No. 2 Maryland	W 90–79; W 91–78; L 78–89
1984	No. 7	First round	No. 10 Texas	L 60–96
1986	No. 10	First round Second round	No. 7 Kentucky; No. 2 Ole Miss	W 73–70; L 71–84
1995	No. 5	First round Second round	No. 12 Ole Miss; No. 4 George Washington	W 87–81 (OT); L 93–96 (OT)
1997	No. 13	First round	No. 4 Illinois	L 62–79
1998	No. 5	First round	No. 12 Colorado State	L 75–81
2000	No. 8	First round	No. 9 Clemson	L 50–64
2001	No. 12	First round	No. 5 Villanova	L 58–66
2002	No. 7	First round Second round Sweet Sixteen	No. 10 Syracuse; No. 2 Baylor; No. 3 South Carolina	W 87–69; W 76–72; L 65–79
2007	No. 16	First round	No. 1 Tennessee	L 37–76
2017	No. 10	First round	No. 7 Kansas State	L 54–67
2018	No. 13	First round	No. 4 Texas A&M	L 76–89
2019	No. 10	First round	No. 7 Missouri	L 76–77 (OT)
2023	No. 12	First round	No. 5 Louisville	L 81–83
2024	No. 12	First round	No. 5 Colorado	L 72–86

=== Women's National Invitation Tournament ===
The Bulldogs are 18–15 in the WNIT all time. They were runners-up in the 1979 edition.

Year	Round	Opponent	Result
1978	Quarterfinals; Consolation; Fifth Place	Long Beach State; Fort Valley (GA); Kansas	L 71–81; W 96–68; W 60–59
1979	Quarterfinals; Semifinals; Championship	Utah; Northern Kentucky; South Carolina	W 88–67; W 78–73; L 71–74
1980	Quarterfinals; Semifinals; Third-place game	Clemson; Virginia; Oregon State	W 88–85; L 63–76; W 67–55
1981	Quarterfinals; Semifinals; Third-place game	Cincinnati; California; Arizona State	W 84–76; L 86–90; W 86–74
1985	Quarterfinals; Semifinals; Third-place game	West Texas State; Florida; Texas Tech	W 96–90; L 80–87; L 74–96
1999	First round Second round Quarterfinals; Semifinals	Utah; Colorado; New Mexico; Arkansas	W 70–62; W 82–66; W 73–60; L 56–80
2004	First round	Nebraska	L 63–70
2006	First round	Nebraska	L 59–62
2008	Second round	Wisconsin-Green Bay; Illinois	W 65–56; L 44–48
2012	First round	South Dakota	L 53–61
2015	First round	Eastern Michigan	L 70–80
2016	First round Second round	Sacred Heart; Northern Iowa	W 95–84; L 58–64
2021	First round Consolation Round 1 Consolation Round 1	Milwaukee; DePaul; Bowling Green	L 46–84; W 100–91; W 78–68
2022	Round 1 Round 2 Round 3	Missouri; Northern Iowa; South Dakota State	W 83–78 (OT); W 100–91; L 66–84

=== Women's Basketball Invitational ===
The Bulldogs are 0–1 in the WBIT all time.

Year	Round	Opponent	Result
2025	First round	Marquette	L 69–74

== MVC All-Centennial team ==
In 2006–07, the Missouri Valley Conference celebrated its centennial as the nation's second-oldest NCAA Division I conference. As part of the celebration, The Valley named All-Centennial teams for each of the sponsored sports. Six of the 35 women's basketball players named were from Drake's program.

Player	No.	Position	Years
Lorri Bauman	55	Forward	1980–1984
Wanda Ford	33	Forward	1982–1986
Jan Jensen	13	Forward	1987–1991
Tricia Wakely	45	Forward	1992–1996
Tammi Blackstone	4	Center	1996–2000
Carla Bennett	54	Center	1999–2003

== Retired numbers ==
Drake Bulldogs retired numbers
No.	Player	Career	Year
13	Jan Jensen	1987–1991	
33	Wanda Ford	1982–1986	
55	Lorri Bauman	1980–1984	2007
