= Aaron Johnston (basketball) =

American basketball coach (born 1974)

Current position
- Title: Head coach
- Team: South Dakota State
- Conference: Summit League
- Record: 655–201 (.764)
- Annual salary: $304,500

Biographical details
- Born: August 28, 1974 (age 52); Pine Island, Minnesota, U.S.
- Education: Gustavus Adolphus College ('96)

Coaching career (HC unless noted)
- 1996–1997: NDSCS (asst.)
- 1997–1999: South Dakota State (GA)
- 1999–2000: South Dakota State (asst.)
- 2000–present: South Dakota State

Head coaching record
- Overall: 655–202 (.764)
- Tournaments: 6–14 (NCAA Division I); 13–2 (NCAA Division II); 13–4 (WNIT)

Accomplishments and honors

Championships
- WNIT (2022); NCAA Division II (2003); 2 NCC regular season (2003–2004); 11 Summit League regular season (2008–2009, 2012–2014, 2019, 2021–2025); 13 Summit League tournament (2009–2013, 2015–2016, 2018–2019, 2023–2026)

Awards
- 2003 Molten/Women’s Division II Bulletin Coach of the Year; 2× Independent League Coach of the Year (2006–2007); 9× Summit League Coach of the Year (2008–2009, 2012, 2014, 2021–2025)

Aaron Johnston (born August 28, 1974) is an American basketball coach who has been the head women's basketball coach at South Dakota State University since 1999. Johnston led the Jackrabbits to the NCAA Division II championship in 2003.

== South Dakota State ==
Aaron Johnston started at South Dakota State working with the men's basketball team as a graduate assistant under then head coach Scott Nagy. He moved to the women's basketball team as an assistant coach under Nancy Neiber. During the 1999–2000 season, Neiber took a leave of absence and Johnston took over as interim for the final six games. During those six games, he went on to defeat the #2 ranked and eventual NCAA D-II Runner up; North Dakota State.

Johnston became head coach of the Jackrabbits on June 30, 2000, making him the seventh head coach in SDSU women's basketball era. In three of his first four years as head coach, he led South Dakota State to the Elite Eight three straight years, and won the NCAA D-II national championship over Northern Kentucky 65–50.

Since joining the Summit League in the 2007–08 season the Jackrabbits have made the postseason every year (11 NCAA, 4 WNIT).

He also coached one year for the South Dakota State Jackrabbits men's and women's golf team.

== Head coaching record ==
Record table
Season	Coach	Overall	Conference	Standing	Postseason
South Dakota State (NCC Division II) (1999–2004)
1999–2000	South Dakota State	4–2*	4–2*	4th	
2000–01	South Dakota State	15–12	9–9	T—5th	
2001–02	South Dakota State	28–9	12–6	T—2nd	NCAA D-II Final Four
2002–03	South Dakota State	32–3	14–2	T—1st	NCAA D-II Champions
2003–04	South Dakota State	26–7	11–3	T—1st	NCAA D-II Elite Eight
South Dakota State (NCAA Division I independent) (2004–2007)
2004–05	South Dakota State	21–7			
2005–06	South Dakota State	19–9			
2006–07	South Dakota State	25–6			WNIT Quarterfinals
South Dakota State (Summit League) (2007–present)
2007–08	South Dakota State	23–7	16–2	1st	WNIT First Round
2008–09	South Dakota State	32–3	17–1	1st	NCAA Second Round
2009–10	South Dakota State	22–11	14–4	2nd	NCAA First Round
2010–11	South Dakota State	19–14	12–6	T—3rd	NCAA First Round
2011–12	South Dakota State	24–9	16–2	1st	NCAA First Round
2012–13	South Dakota State	25–8	14–2	1st	NCAA First Round
2013–14	South Dakota State	26–10	13–1	1st	WNIT Semifinals
2014–15	South Dakota State	24–9	12–4	2nd	NCAA First Round
2015–16	South Dakota State	27–7	13–3	2nd	NCAA Second Round
2016–17	South Dakota State	23–9	12–4	T—2nd	WNIT Second Round
2017–18	South Dakota State	26–7	12–2	2nd	NCAA First Round
2018–19	South Dakota State	28–7	15–1	1st	NCAA Sweet Sixteen
2019–20	South Dakota State	23–10	13–3	2nd	Postseason not held
2020–21	South Dakota State	21–4	14–0	1st	NCAA First Round
2021–22	South Dakota State	29–9	17–1	T—1st	WNIT Champions
2022–23	South Dakota State	29–6	18–0	1st	NCAA Second Round
2023–24	South Dakota State	27–6	16–0	1st	NCAA First Round
2024–25	South Dakota State	30–4	16–0	1st	NCAA Second Round
2025–26	South Dakota State	27–7	14–2	2nd	NCAA First Round
2026–27	South Dakota State	0–0	0–0		
South Dakota State:		655–202 (.764)	321–60 (.843)		
Total:		655–202 (.764)			
National champion Postseason invitational champion Conference regular season champion Conference regular season and conference tournament champion Division regular season champion Division regular season and conference tournament champion Conference tournament champion

*Named interim coach for the final six games.

== Players drafted into WNBA ==
- Megan Vogel (2007 WNBA draft) 2nd Round, 19th overall
- Macy Miller (2019 WNBA draft) 3rd Round, 36th overall

== See also ==
- List of college women's basketball career coaching wins leaders
